= Sanriku earthquake =

Sanriku earthquake (Japanese: 三陸沖地震) may refer to:

- 869 Sanriku earthquake
- 1611 Sanriku earthquake
- 1896 Sanriku earthquake
- 1933 Sanriku earthquake
- 1994 offshore Sanriku earthquake
- 2011 Tōhoku earthquake and tsunami
- 2012 Sanriku earthquake
- 2025 Sanriku earthquake
- 2026 Sanriku earthquake

== See also ==
- Seismicity of the Sanriku coast
- Sanriku tsunami (disambiguation)
