= 2025 Aomori earthquake =

Earthquake off the coast of Aomori Prefecture, Japan

- USGS ShakeMap
- Location within Japan
- UTC time: 2025-12-08 14:15:10
- ISC event: 644817229
- USGS-ANSS: ComCat
- Local date: 8 December 2025
- Local time: 23:15:10 JST (UTC+9)
- Duration: 30 seconds
- Magnitude: M_{JMA} 7.5 M_{w} 7.6
- Depth: 40.7 km (25 mi)
- Epicenter: 40.960°N 142.185°E
- Type: Thrust
- Areas affected: Sanriku and Hokkaido, Japan
- Max. intensity: JMA 6+ (MMI VIII)
- Peak acceleration: 0.472 g
- Peak velocity: 44.82 cm (17.65 in)/s
- Tsunami: 70 cm (28 in)
- Aftershocks: 129+ ≥M_{w}4.0; M_{ww}6.7 on 12 December 2025 (strongest)
- Casualties: 47 injuries

On 8 December 2025, at 23:15:10 JST (14:15:10 UTC), a M_{w} 7.6 earthquake struck in the Pacific Ocean off the coast of Aomori Prefecture, Sanriku, Japan. The earthquake generated tsunamis that reached heights of up to 70 cm (28 in) along the coast of northern Japan. The earthquake resulted in injuries to 47 people, damaged more than 5,000 buildings in Aomori and Hokkaido, and triggered the Off the Coast of Hokkaido and Sanriku Subsequent Earthquake Advisory due to fears of a more powerful earthquake along the Sanriku and Hokkaido coasts.

== Tectonic setting ==
The northern part of Honshu and Hokkaido lie above the convergent plate boundary where the Pacific plate is subducting beneath the Okhotsk microplate. The convergence rate across this boundary lies in the range of 7.9–9.2 cm (3.1–3.6 in) per year. The plate interface in the area of the earthquake epicenter shows an abrupt increase in dip from about 5° to about 15°, 80 km (50 mi) landward of the Japan Trench. This part of the plate boundary has been the location of many powerful historical earthquakes, dating back to the 869 Sanriku earthquake and most recently of the devastating 2011 Tōhoku earthquake. Most of these events relate to rupture along the plate interface, but some, such as the 1933 Sanriku earthquake, involved deformation within the subducting plate. According to the studies of past great earthquakes, a weak seismic coupling is suggested in the offshore Sanriku region. From the distribution of past seismicity, the width of coupling at 40°N was assumed to be about 150 km (93 mi).

== Earthquake ==
Map of aftershocks (map data)

The earthquake occurred on 8 December 2025 at 23:15 JST (14:15 UTC) with an epicenter off the coast of Aomori Prefecture. The United States Geological Survey said it measured the earthquake as M_{w} 7.6 and was caused by thrust faulting at a depth of 40.7 km (25.3 mi). The Japan Meteorological Agency placed the earthquake's magnitude at M_{w} 7.5 and measured a maximum intensity of upper 6 on the Shindo scale in Hachinohe. Shaking was felt as far as Tokyo and lasted for more than 30 seconds. A USGS seismic installation at Noheji recorded 0.3326 g in ground acceleration (pga) and 44.82 cm/s (17.65 in/s) in ground velocity (pgv); the station data corresponded to a Modified Mercalli intensity (MMI) of VIII (Severe); another installation at Hachinohe recorded a pga of 0.472 g. A 5.5 mb aftershock occurred at 23:33 JST (14:33 UTC), followed by a M_{ww}6.0 aftershock at 03:56 JST (18:56 UTC) and a M_{ww}6.6 aftershock at 06:52 JST (21:52 UTC). A M_{ww}6.7 aftershock occurred at 11:44 JST (02:44 UTC) on 12 December. A M_{ww}6.0 aftershock occurred at 23:26 JST (14:26 UTC) on 31 December.

Locations with a seismic intensity of Shindo 5− and higher
Intensity	Prefecture	Locations
6+	Aomori	Hachinohe
6−	Aomori	Oirase, Hashikami
5+	Aomori	Noheji, Shichinohe, Tōhoku, Gonohe, Nanbu, Mutsu, Higashidōri
5+	Hokkaido	Hakodate
5+	Iwate	Karumai, Ichinohe
5−	Aomori	Misawa, Rokunohe, Yokohama, Rokkasho, Sannohe, Goshogawara, Tsugaru, Hiranai, Sotogahama, Tsuruta
5−	Hokkaido	Shinshinotsu, Chitose, Nanporo, Tomakomai, Shiraoi, Atsuma, Abira, Mukawa, Niikappu, Shinhidaka, Urakawa, Samani, Urahoro, Taiki
5−	Iwate	Morioka, Ninohe, Hachimantai, Takizawa, Kuji
5−	Miyagi	Tome

== Tsunami ==
Tsunami warnings for waves of up to 3 m (9.8 ft) were issued along the Pacific coasts of Aomori, Iwate, and Hokkaido Prefectures, while a tsunami advisory was issued in Miyagi and Fukushima Prefectures. More than 90,000 people were ordered to be evacuated. The Pacific Tsunami Warning Center said hazardous waves were possible as far as 1,000 km (620 mi) from the epicenter, affecting the coasts of Japan and Russia. The JMA lifted all tsunami advisories at 06:30 JST on 9 December.

Waves reaching up to 70 cm (28 in) were observed in Kuji, while 50 cm (20 in) waves were observed in Urakawa. Waves reaching 40 cm (16 in) were observed in Mutsu and Hachinohe. In Erimo, wave heights reached 30 cm (12 in), and in Tomakomai, Shiraoi, Kamaishi, Ishinomaki, and Sendai, it was 20 cm (7.9 in).

Following the M_{ww}6.7 aftershock on 12 December, the JMA issued tsunami advisories for waves of up to 1 m (3 ft 3 in) off the Pacific coast of Hokkaido, Aomori, Iwate and Miyagi prefectures. An evacuation order was issued by authorities in Sendai. Waves measuring 20 cm (7.9 in) were observed in Erimo and Hachinohe, after which the advisory was lifted at 14:05 JST (05:05 UTC).

== Impact ==
At least 47 people were injured including 32 in Aomori, 11 in Hokkaido, and 4 in Iwate. In Aomori, 65 homes collapsed and 5,044 structures were damaged overall, including 2,436 homes, 460 commercial and industrial buildings, 271 schools, 214 welfare facilities, 63 hospitals, 27 tourist facilities, 7 ports, and 5 prefectural facilities. There were 16 injuries in Hachinohe, 3 in Gonohe, 2 each in Mutsu, Oirase, Tōhoku and Misawa, and 1 each in Hashikami, Aomori City, Nanbu, Hiranai, Goshogawara. In Hachinohe, 57 homes partially or fully collapsed, 2,013 others and a restaurant were damaged, windows shattered and ground heaves were reported. Liquefaction damage also occurred at the Port of Hachinohe, with Higashidōri, Yokohama and Misawa's ports also suffering damage. Two fires occurred in Aomori City, while one person was injured after his car fell into a hole in Tōhoku. An elderly woman was wounded by a falling cabinet in Oirase, while another woman was injured by falling debris in her home in Goshogawara. Two people were also injured after falling in Tomakomai, Hokkaido. Two homes were damaged in the prefecture.

Services on the Tōhoku Shinkansen between Shin-Aomori Station and Fukushima Station were suspended. A shinkansen train carrying 94 passengers was stranded in Aomori. In total, 26 trains were suspended and nine were delayed for up to 71 minutes, affecting around 17,000 people. Sixty passengers were transferred to buses. The release of treated wastewater from the Fukushima Daiichi Nuclear Power Plant into the Pacific Ocean was suspended. Around 480 L (110 imp gal; 130 US gal) of water spilled from a spent fuel cooling area at the Rokkasho Reprocessing Plant. The Nuclear Regulation Authority said the facility's water level remained within the normal range and there was no safety concern.

Power outages were reported in Iwate and Hokkaido. Around 2,700 houses in Aomori Prefecture lost electricity. Several oyster rafts were damaged by tsunami waves. The ceiling of the domestic terminal at New Chitose Airport partially cracked and collapsed, stranding 200 passengers. A hospital in Mutsu was partially flooded after its sprinkler system was damaged, forcing the evacuation of 31 patients. Around 1,360 homes in Aomori and Iwate lost water due to damaged pipes. Classes were suspended at more than 300 schools in Hokkaido, Aomori, Iwate, Miyagi and Fukushima prefectures. At least 450 buildings in Aomori were damaged.

Following the M_{ww}6.7 aftershock on 12 December, authorities in Hachinohe ordered the evacuation of 48 households near a telecom tower owned by NTT East that was damaged during the mainshock on 8 December, citing the risk of a total collapse. Services on the Tohoku Shinkansen were again suspended due to power outages between Sendai and Aomori stations. A woman was injured due to a fall in Hiranai.

== Response ==
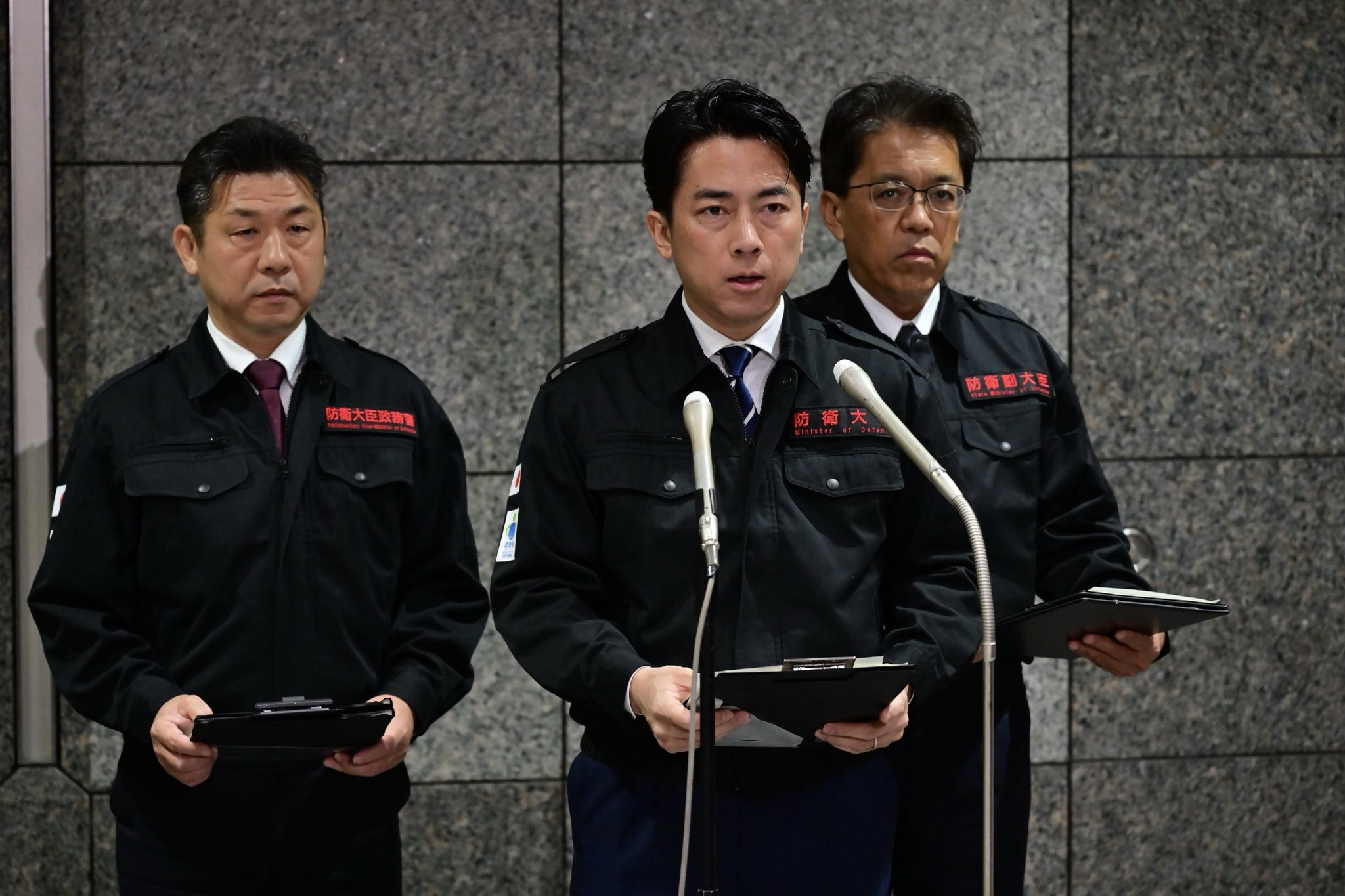
Japan's Defense Minister Shinjiro Koizumi comments on the earthquake response.

The Japanese government established a task force to respond to the earthquake. Around 620 residents and 270 vehicles sheltered at JSDF facilities in Hachinohe, while 18 JSDF helicopters were mobilized to conduct a damage assessment. Up to 342 evacuation shelters were opened across five prefectures and used by around 9,200 people.

Following the earthquake, the JMA issued the first "Off the Coast of Hokkaido and Sanriku Subsequent Earthquake Advisory", advising of an increased possibility of a stronger earthquake hitting the Hokkaido and Sanriku coasts in the following days. The advisory is issued following a large (7+ M_{w}) earthquake in the region of the Kuril–Kamchatka and Japan Trenches and analysis determines that the chance of a larger earthquake increases from 0.1% per week to 1% per week. For example, the M_{w}9.1 2011 Tōhoku earthquake and tsunami was preceded by a M_{w}7.2 foreshock two days prior. The purpose of the advisory is to increase disaster preparedness in the potentially affected areas along Japan's Pacific coasts, however it does not begin evacuation procedures. The advisory affected 182 municipalities from Hokkaido to Chiba Prefecture. Its issuance led to an increase in northeastern Japan of purchases of disaster-related items such as bottled water, disaster kits, torches, water storage tanks and support poles. The JMA lifted the advisory on 16 December.

== See also ==
- List of earthquakes in 2025
- List of earthquakes in Japan
- 1968 Tokachi earthquake
- 1994 offshore Sanriku earthquake
- 2022 Fukushima earthquake
- 2026 Sanriku earthquake
