= 2026 Sanriku earthquake =

Earthquake off the coast of Iwate Prefecture, Japan

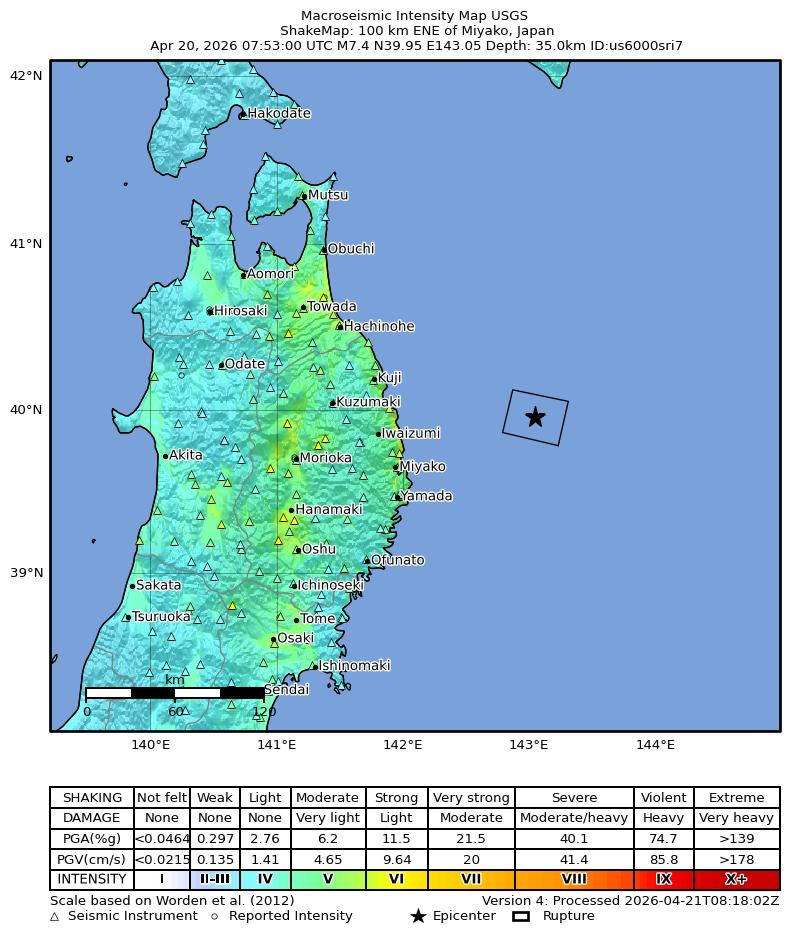
- USGS ShakeMap

- Location within Japan
- UTC time: 2026-04-20 07:53:00
- ISC event: 645637641
- USGS-ANSS: ComCat
- Local date: April 20, 2026
- Local time: 16:53:00 JST (UTC+9)
- Duration: 12 seconds
- Magnitude: M_{JMA} 7.5 M_{w} 7.4–7.5
- Depth: 35 km (22 mi) (USGS)
- Epicenter: 39.953°N 143.046°E
- Fault: Japan Trench
- Type: Thrust
- Areas affected: Tōhoku region and Hokkaido, Japan
- Total damage: 233 structures damaged
- Max. intensity: JMA 5+ (MMI VI)
- Peak acceleration: 0.404 g
- Peak velocity: 15.01 cm/s (5.91 in/s)
- Tsunami: 79 cm (31 in) (Kuji, Iwate)
- Foreshocks: 162 ≥M_{w} 4.0; M_{w} 6.8 on November 9, 2025 (Strongest)
- Aftershocks: 18 ≥M_{w} 4.0; M_{w} 6.9 on June 25, 2026 (Strongest)
- Casualties: 10 injuries

On 20 April 2026 at 16:53 JST (07:53 UTC), a M_{JMA} 7.5 (M_{w} 7.4–7.5) earthquake struck off the Sanriku Coast of Honshu, Japan, along the Japan Trench. The earthquake caused strong shaking in Iwate and Aomori, with a maximum intensity of 5-upper (5+) on the Japan Meteorological Agency seismic intensity scale, recorded in Hashikami, Aomori. Additionally, it generated long-period ground motion of class 3 in southern Akita and northern Miyagi prefectures.

== Tectonic setting ==
The northern parts of Honshu and the island of Hokkaido lie above the convergent plate boundary where the Pacific plate is subducting beneath the Okhotsk microplate. The convergence rate across this boundary lies in the range of 7.9–9.2 cm per year. The plate interface in the area of the earthquake epicenter shows an abrupt increase in dip from about 5° to about 15°, 80 km landward of the Japan Trench. This part of the plate boundary has been the location of many powerful historical earthquakes, dating back to the 869 Sanriku earthquake and the devastating 2011 Tōhoku earthquake. Most of these events relate to rupture along the plate interface, but some, such as the 1933 Sanriku earthquake, involved deformation within the subducting plate. According to the studies of past great earthquakes, a weak seismic coupling is suggested in the offshore Sanriku region. From the distribution of past seismicity, the width of coupling at 40°N was assumed to be about 150 km.

== Earthquake ==
The United States Geological Survey (USGS) said it measured the earthquake at M_{w} 7.4 and was caused by a east-northeast-dipping, southwest–northeast-striking thrust fault at a depth of 35 km (22 mi), while the Japan Meteorological Agency (JMA) put the preliminary magnitude at M_{JMA} 7.5 and later updated to M_{JMA} 7.7 though reversing the estimate later. Tremors were felt from Hokkaido to Aichi. The Global Centroid Moment Tensor (GCMT) assigned the earthquake a moment magnitude of M_{w} 7.5. A USGS finite fault model estimates a rupture area of 70 km × 65 km (43 mi × 40 mi), with a maximum slip of 4.735 m (15.53 ft) near the hypocenter. The observed source time function gives a 12-second duration for the earthquake, with the greatest phase of seismic moment release occurring less than 10 seconds after initiation. A USGS seismic installation at Shingō, Aomori recorded 15.01 cm/s (5.91 in/s) in ground velocity (pgv), while another installation at Morioka, Iwate recorded a peak ground acceleration (pga) of 0.404 g.

A foreshock sequence preceding the mainshock began in November 2025; 162 foreshocks exceeding M_{w} 4.0 occurred, including five M_{w} 6.0+ events, the strongest of which measured M_{w} 6.8. By 23 April, 17 aftershocks measuring M_{w} 4.0 or higher occurred, the strongest measuring M_{w} 5.6.

Locations with a seismic intensity of Shindo 4 and higher
Intensity	Prefecture	Locations
5+	Aomori	Hashikami
5−	Aomori	Hachinohe, Shichinohe, Tohoku, Oirase, Gonohe, Nanbu
5−	Iwate	Miyako, Morioka, Fudai, Ninohe, Hachimantai, Yahaba, Hanamaki
5−	Miyagi	Tome, Wakuya
4	Aomori	Towada, Misawa, Noheji, Rokunohe, Yokohama, Rokkasho, Sannohe, Takko, Shingō, Aomori, Tsugaru, Hiranai, Sotogahama, Fujisaki, Mutsu, Higashidōri
4	Iwate	Kuji, Yamada, Iwaizumi, Tanohata, Noda, Hirono, Takizawa, Shizukuishi, Kuzumaki, Iwate, Shiwa, Karumai, Kunohe, Ichinohe, Kitakami, Tōno, Ichinoseki, Ōshū, Nishiwaga, Kanegasaki, Hiraizumi, Ōfunato, Kamaishi, Sumita, Ōtsuchi
4	Miyagi	Kesennuma, Kurihara, Ōsaki, Shikama, Misato, Natori, Kakuda, Iwanuma, Zaō, Ōgawara, Kawasaki, Marumori, Watari, Yamamoto, Sendai, Ishinomaki, Higashimatsushima, Matsushima
4	Hokkaido	Hakodate, Niikappu
4	Akita	Mitane, Ikawa, Akita, Yurihonjō, Nikaho, Ōdate, Kazuno, Kitaakita, Yokote, Daisen, Misato
4	Yamagata	Sakata, Mikawa, Murayama, Nakayama
4	Fukushima	Kunimi

=== Tsunami ===
The JMA issued a tsunami warning for waves reaching up to 3 metres (9.8 ft) high in parts of Iwate Prefecture, Aomori, and Hokkaido Prefectures. These warnings were later downgraded to advisories, before being lifted at 23:50 JST. An 80-centimeter-high (31 in) tsunami struck Kuji, Iwate. At Miyako and Urakawa, Hokkaido, the tsunami was 40 centimeters (16 in) high, while 30-centimeter (12 in) waves were observed in Hiroo and Erimo in Hokkaido and Sendai, Miyagi.

== Impact ==
Ten people were injured, two in Hokkaido, and four each in Aomori and Iwate prefectures. Two of the victims were seriously injured. At least 232 buildings were damaged in Aomori Prefecture. A road was damaged in Ishinomaki, Miyagi Prefecture. Roughly 200 households lost power in Hiraizumi, Iwate. Evacuation orders were issued to 82,811 households and 175,957 people from a total of 13 cities, 21 towns and 6 villages in Hokkaido, Aomori, Iwate, Miyagi, and Fukushima Prefectures. Schools were closed for April 21 in Urakawa, and several schools in Aomori Prefecture. The earthquake resulted in suspension of Shinkansen lines including the Hokkaido, Tokaido and Tōhoku Shinkansen. Ferry services between Aomori and Hakodate were also cancelled.

== Response ==
The JMA issued an Off the coast of Hokkaido and Sanriku subsequent earthquake advisory until April 27, warning about a possibility of a stronger earthquake. Along with the Cabinet Office, the Japan Meteorological Agency stated that the chance of a "megaquake" exceeding magnitude eight would be increased tenfold over during this period, up to 1% following the quake from a background risk of 0.1%.

== Misinformation ==
Following the earthquake, social media posts circulating on X uploaded by various accounts in and outside Japan claimed to show footage of the earthquake using videos and images of the 2024 Noto earthquake and the 2011 Tōhoku earthquake and tsunami as well as AI-generated content. As a result, the Ministry of Internal Affairs and Communications requested X and other major social media sites "to take appropriate measures based on the terms of use".

== 25 June aftershock ==
On 25 June, a M_{w} 6.9 earthquake struck off the coast of Iwate Prefecture along the at a depth of about 34 km (21 mi). It caused strong shaking across coastal northeastern Honshu, particularly in Iwate and Aomori, but no tsunami warning was issued and damage remained limited. This was later confirmed as aftershock.

In Aomori Prefecture, 10 people were injured, some walls collapsed, and 366 buildings were damaged. Another two people were injured, and the ceiling of an office building collapsed in Iwate Prefecture.

Intensity	Prefecture	Location
6+	Aomori	Hashikami
6-	Aomori	Hachinohe
5+	Aomori	Sannohe
5+	Iwate	Fudai, Morioka, Ninohe, Hachimantai, Karumai
5-	Aomori	Misawa, Noheji, Rokunohe, Tohoku, Oirase, Gonohe, Nanbu
5-	Iwate	Kuji, Noda, Hirono, Takizawa, Kuzumaki, Iwate, Shiwa, Yahaba, Ichinohe
5-	Miyagi	Tome

== See also ==
- List of earthquakes in 2026
- List of earthquakes in Japan
- 1968 Tokachi earthquake
- 1994 offshore Sanriku earthquake
- 2025 Aomori earthquake
- 2026 Ōtsuchi wildfires – wildfire in the area that occurred two days after
- 2026 Kumamoto earthquake – earthquake that hit elsewhere in Japan later the same year
