= 1454 Kyōtoku earthquake and tsunami =

Historical Japanese earthquake

- Location within Japan
- Local date: 23 November 1454
- Local time: Midnight
- Magnitude: 8.4 M_{w}
- Epicenter: 38.5°N 143.8°E
- Type: Megathrust
- Areas affected: Miyagi Prefecture; Japan
- Tsunami: Yes
- Casualties: Many

The Kanto and Tōhoku regions of Japan were struck by major earthquake at midnight on 23 November 1454, which triggered a large tsunami that led to many deaths. It had an estimated magnitude of about 8.4 M_{w}, based on the extent of observed tsunami deposits.

== Earthquake ==
The only records of this event come from a set of diaries, known as "Oudai-ki", kept by priests in a temple in present-day Yamanashi Prefecture. The entry for this earthquake just gives the date and time and mentions a major tsunami that drowned many people along the coast of Tohoku.

The magnitude of this earthquake has been estimated using the extent and distribution of tsunami deposits thought to have been formed by the triggered tsunami. A maximum inundation in the range 1.0 to 2.5 km has been inferred from the deposits. Modelling of possible earthquake ruptures gives an estimate of M_{w} 8.4. with a rupture area the same as for the 869 Jōgan earthquake.

== Tsunami ==
Apart from a brief mention in the priests' diaries the knowledge of the extent of this tsunami comes entirely from the interpretation of tsunami deposits.

=== Tsunami deposits ===
Two sand sheets were found during investigations of "scour ponds", erosional features found along beach ridges formed by tsunamis of major storm events, on the edge of the Sendai Plain. The upper sand sheet correlates with one found elsewhere on the Sendai Plain. In both cases the identified deposits are younger than the Towada ash layer, dated to AD 915. There remains some uncertainty as to the identification of individual deposits, due to the presence of deposits apparently related to the 1611 Sanriku earthquake, as the time gap between the two earthquakes is small compared to the accuracy of the dating method.

Turbidite sands found in core samples in the Japan Trench have also been correlated with the 1454 tsunami.
