= Seismicity of the Sanriku coast =

Aspect of northeastern Honshū in Japan

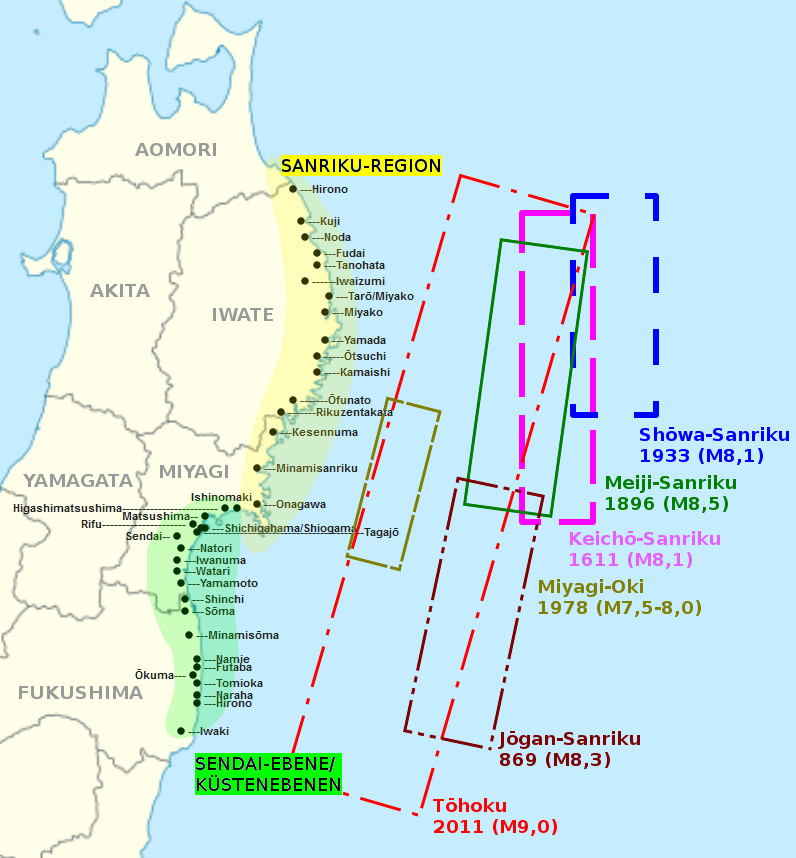
Historical tsunamis in the Sanriku area and selection of areas affected by the 2011 Tōhoku tsunami

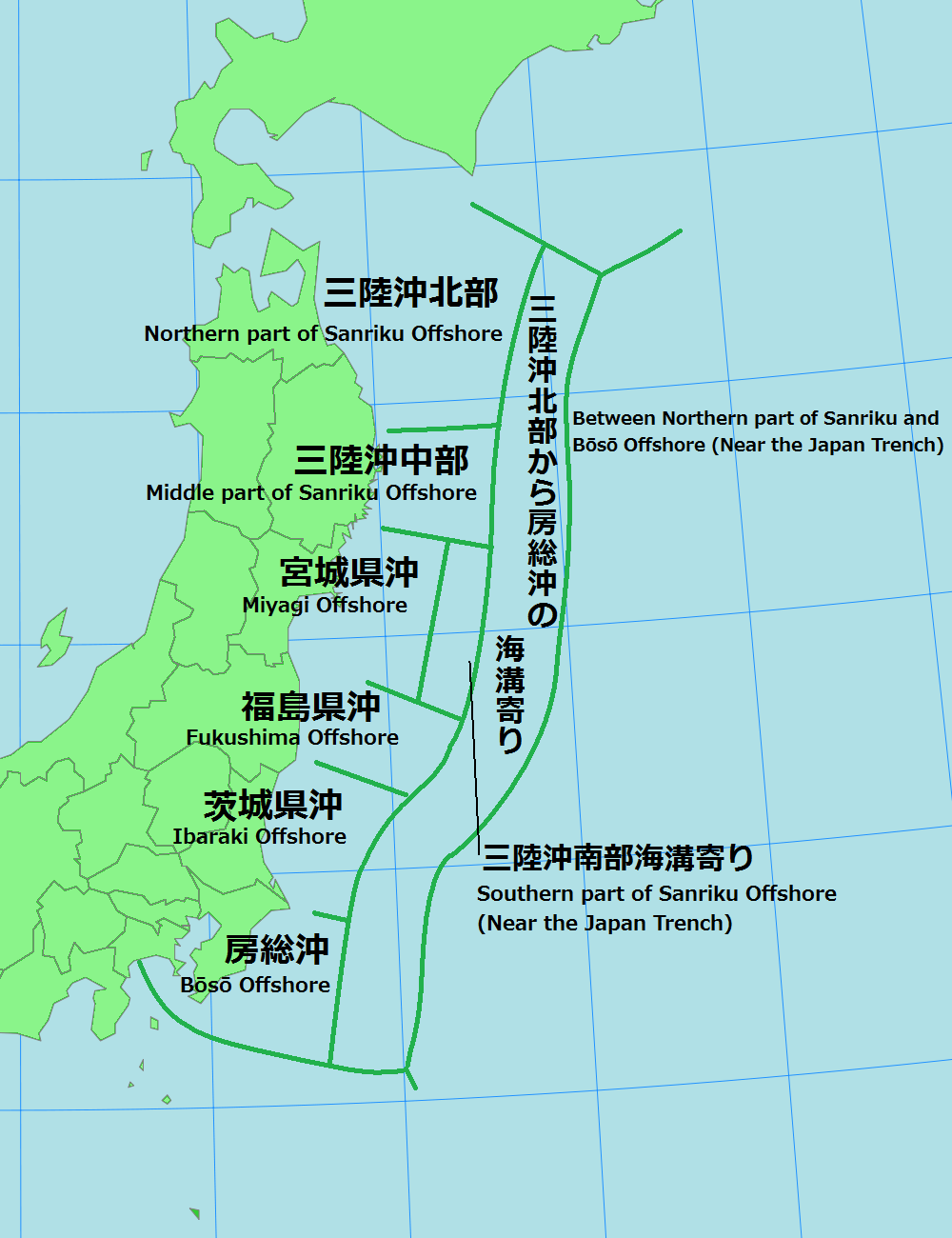
Seismic regions around the East Japan Megathrust designated by the Headquarters for Earthquake Research Promotion

The seismicity of the Sanriku coast identifies and describes the seismic activity of an area of Japan. Seismicity refers to the frequency, type and size of earthquakes experienced over a period of time. The Sanriku Coast (三陸海岸, Sanriku kaigan) is a descriptive term referring to the coastal areas of the former provinces of Rikuō in Aomori, Rikuchū in Iwate, and Rikuzen in Miyagi.

The irregular ria coastline and its many bays tend to amplify the destructiveness of tsunami waves which reach the shores of Sanriku, as demonstrated in the damage caused by the 2011 Tōhoku earthquake and tsunami.

== History ==
The Sanriku coast has a well-documented history of significant seismic activity. A major earthquake in the 19th century caused more than 20,000 deaths, and another in the 20th century caused thousands more. The recurrence of major seismic activity continues in the 21st century.

== Ancient ==
There is geological evidence of six catastrophic tsunamis hitting the Sanriku coast within 6000 years. Among them are:

- A catastrophic tsunami about 5400–6000 years ago, predating the Towada eruption.
- A catastrophic tsunami about 2000 years ago.
- 869 AD: Jogan earthquake and tsunami.
- 1611 AD: Keicho Sanriku earthquake.

=== 19th century ===
Some 22,000 people were killed in the Meiji Sanriku earthquake of 1896. Most of the deaths were caused by tsunami. The disaster struck at 7:32 pm on the afternoon of June 15. The epicenter was determined to have been located at 39.5 Latitude/140.6 Longitude, and the earthquake had an estimated magnitude of M_{w} 8.5.

=== 20th century ===
Major seismic activity on the Sanriku coast during the 20th century includes:

- 1933 Sanriku earthquake: More than 3,000 people died; the casualties were caused by the subsequent tsunami. This quake/tsunami was not on the scale of the March 2011 disaster, nor earlier disasters noted above.
- 1978 Miyagi earthquake: Damage was greatest around Sendai. The earthquake triggered widespread landslides.
- 1994 offshore Sanriku earthquake. Damage in Hachinohe, Aomori.

=== 21st century ===
Significant seismic events which devastated Sanriku coastal communities in the 21st century include:

- 2003 Miyagi earthquake. There were two major earthquakes in 2003 in Miyagi Prefecture. The first quake in May injured 171 and caused $97.3 million in damage. Another quake in July injured 676. More than 11,000 buildings were affected, causing an estimated $195.4 million in damage.
- 2005 Miyagi earthquake. The seismic event was originally recorded by the United States Geological Survey as a 7.2-magnitude earthquake on the Moment magnitude scale, but the Japan Meteorological Agency called it a magnitude 6.9 earthquake. The slippage in the seabed subduction zone was located about 330 miles (530 kilometres) east-northeast of Tokyo about 24 miles (39 kilometres) below the surface of the Pacific Ocean. The Japan Meteorological Agency issued a tsunami warning almost immediately; and warnings were also issued for the northwest coast of the United States
- 2011 Tōhoku earthquake and tsunami. In March 2011, the largest earthquake ever recorded in Japan struck off the Sanriku coast, setting off a 10 metres (33 feet) tsunami. The 9.0-magnitude quake near Tohoku was comparable in scale to undersea seismic events near Indonesia in 2004 (3rd largest on record) and near Chile in 2010 (6th largest). It caused 15,889 deaths, 6,152 injured, and 2,609 people missing across twenty prefectures, with an estimated $235 billion in property damage.

In the list of 45 most powerful earthquakes recorded worldwide since 1500, there are five that appear to be clustered in an 8-year span (in 2004, 2005, 2010, 2011, 2012) with the largest being the 2004 Indian Ocean earthquake of magnitude 9.1. Prior to this, no sizable earthquake occurred. There was another apparent cluster (in 1960, 1963, 1964, 1965) which contained the largest recorded earthquake, the 1960 Valdivia earthquake of magnitude 9.4. However, experts construe this as a statistical anomaly or random chance.

The phenomenon of comparably large quakes that happen on the same or neighbouring faults within months of each other—for example, the Miyagi quakes in 2003—can be explained by a sound geological mechanism. This does not fully demonstrate a relationship between events separated by longer periods and greater distances.

== Seismic mechanisms ==
Earthquakes occur where the Pacific plate meets the plate beneath northern Honshu in a subduction zone. The Pacific plate, which moves at a rate of 8 to 9 cm (3.1 to 3.5 in) per year, dips under Honshu's underlying plate releasing large amounts of energy. This motion pulls the upper plate down until the stress builds up enough to cause a seismic event.

Quakes of large magnitudes in the Sanriku region can have a rupture length of hundreds of kilometers; and this generally requires a long, relatively straight fault surface. However, the plate boundary and subduction zone in this area is not very straight. The "epicentral region" of an earthquake is defined as an elliptical area which encompasses the location of highest felt intensity of an earthquake. This term is used for identifying the likely epicenter for earthquakes and tsunami in the history of the Sanriku coast.

The hypocentral region of Sanriku coastal earthquakes can occur in locations extending from offshore Aomori Prefecture to offshore Ibaraki Prefecture.

== See also ==
- List of earthquakes in Japan
- Sanriku earthquake (Sanriku tsunami)
