= 1611 Sanriku earthquake =

Earthquake and tsunami affecting Japan

- Location within Japan
- Local date: December 2, 1611
- Local time: 10:30
- Magnitude: 8.1 M_{s}
- Epicenter: 39.0°N 144.4°E
- Areas affected: Japan: Pacific Ocean, Tōhoku region
- Tsunami: yes
- Casualties: About 5,000

The 1611 Sanriku earthquake (慶長三陸地震, Keichō Sanriku Jishin) occurred on December 2, 1611, with an epicenter off the Sanriku coast in Iwate Prefecture, Japan. The magnitude of the earthquake was 8.1M_{s}. It triggered a devastating tsunami. A description of this event in an official diary from 1612 is probably the first recorded use of the term 'tsunami'.

== Overview ==
At about 10:30 on December 2, 1611 (Keichō 16, 10th month, 28th day), there was a severe earthquake, and at about 14:00 (local time), this was followed by a devastating tsunami. According to old documents, the earth shook violently three times.

The estimated rupture area for the earthquake is similar to that calculated for the 1933 Sanriku earthquake.

The earthquake struck an area along the Pacific Ocean known as the Sanriku Coast, where the shaking intensity was 4–5 on the Shindo scale. The damage from the tsunami far exceeded that from the earthquake, so this is considered to be a tsunami earthquake. Consequently, the disaster caused by earthquake is also known as the "Keicho Sanriku tsunami earthquake". It would have been very similar to the 1605 Keichō Nankaidō earthquake, a tsunami earthquake in the Nankai Trough area.

== Sources ==
The source of the earthquake was off the north coast of Sanriku. However, due to the time delay of nearly four hours before the tsunami arrived, there are questions about the exact location of the source.

Professor Kazuomi Hirakawa of Hokkaido University has found tsunami deposits on the southern part of Hokkaido and northern Sanriku from the early part of the 17th century. It is possible that the earthquake and tsunami in Sanriku was an enormous quake that resonated even in the area of the Kurile Trench off the eastern coast of Hokkaido.

== Damage ==
The tsunami reached its maximum estimated height of about 20 metres (66 ft) at Ōfunato, Iwate.

The tsunami struck on the east coast of Sanriku from Sendai bay in the south to southeastern Hokkaido in the north, a greater length of coastline than was affected by the 1896 tsunami. According to old documents, 1,783 people were killed in the Sendai Domain, and over 3000 horses and men in the Nanbu and Tsugaru domains. On the southern coast of Hokkaido, many Ainu were also drowned ("Hokkaido History"). Amongst the worst affected places was Ōtsuchi, with 800 deaths.

== See also ==
- List of earthquakes in Japan
- List of historical earthquakes
