= 2026 Japan earthquake =

2026 Japan earthquake may refer to:

- 2026 Sanriku earthquake which occurred on 20 April 2026
- 2026 Kumamoto earthquake which occurred on 28 July 2026
