= Tairyō-bata =

Traditional Japanese fisherman's flags

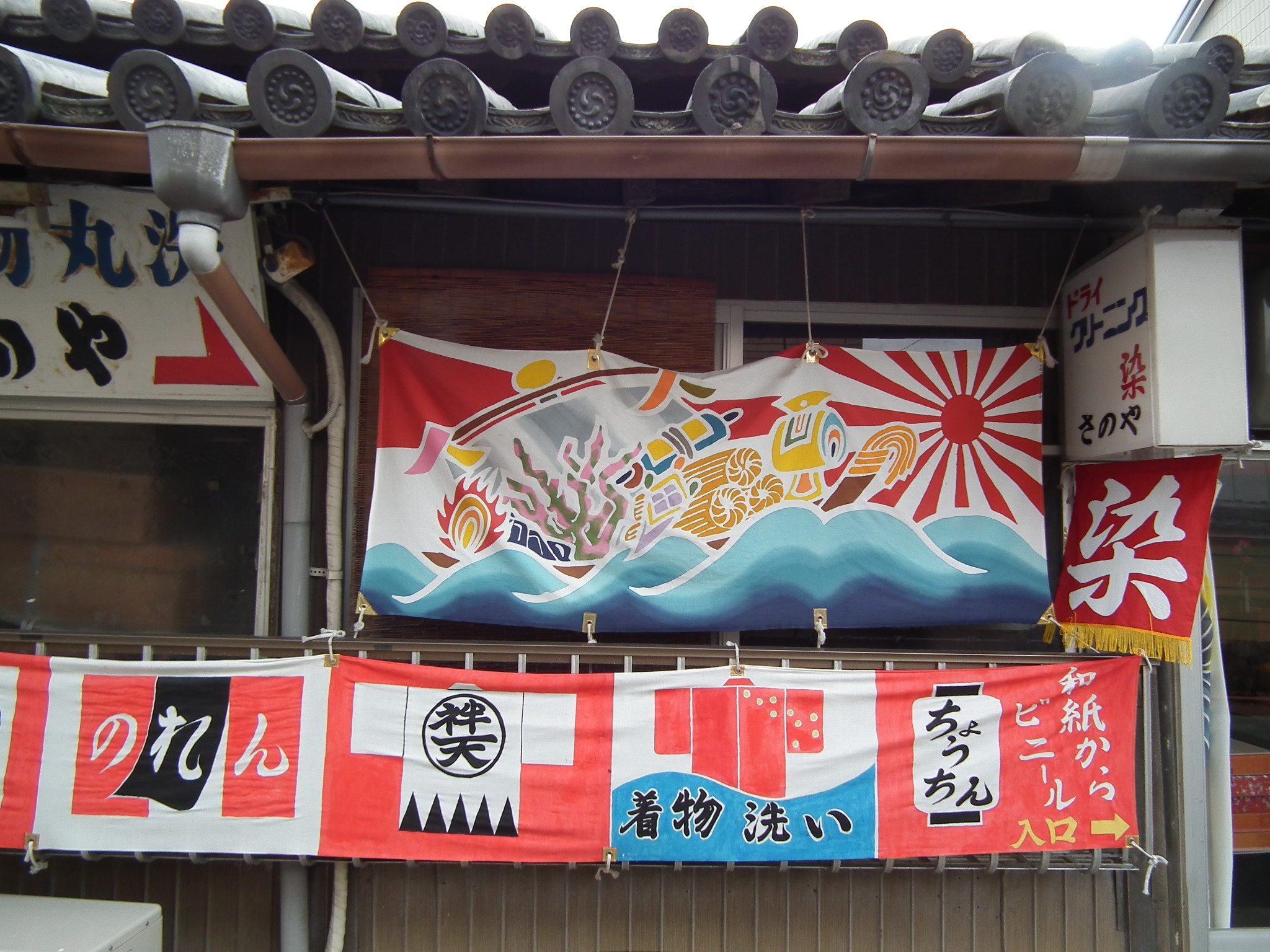
Tairyō-bata, Sumoto, Japan

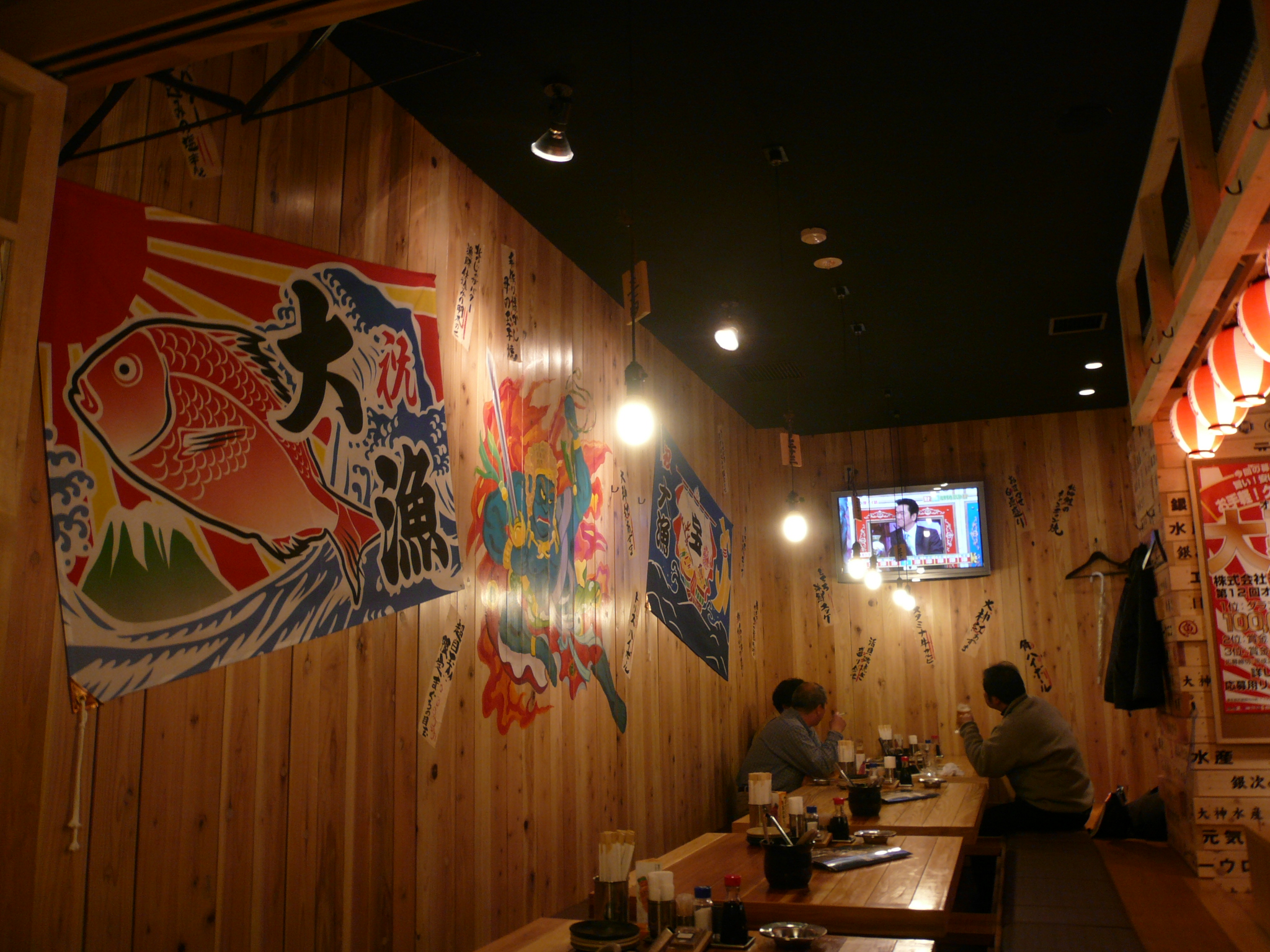
Store with Tairyō-bata (大漁旗, big catch flag) in Tokyo.

Tairyō-bata (大漁旗), also called tairyo-ki, are originally traditional Japanese fisherman's flags flown by boats to signify a large catch of fish in returning its port. There are several local aliases, including Furai-ki (福来旗) in Sanriku Coast area.

Today, they are used as a decorative flags on vessels, for festivals and events, and for celebrating longevity. They also became the symbol of recovery from the 2011 Tōhoku earthquake and tsunami in the Tōhoku region.

Literally translated as "big catch flag", each rectangular flag bears an intricate design specific to the company or boat, typically involving bright colors and ocean motifs. Many of these flags can be seen in the coastal communities of Japan. The Shiyogama Shrine in the Sendai region issues tairyō-bata to new-born infants, apparently as a humorous reference to the baby being a big catch.
