= Depositional environment =

Processes associated with the deposition of a particular type of sediment

A diagram of various depositional environments

In geology, depositional environment or sedimentary environment describes the combination of physical, chemical, and biological processes associated with the deposition of a particular type of sediment and, therefore, the rock types that will be formed after lithification, if the sediment is preserved in the rock record. In most cases, the environments associated with particular rock types or associations of rock types can be matched to existing analogues. However, the further back in geological time sediments were deposited, the more likely that direct modern analogues are not available (e.g. banded iron formations).

== Types of depositional environments ==
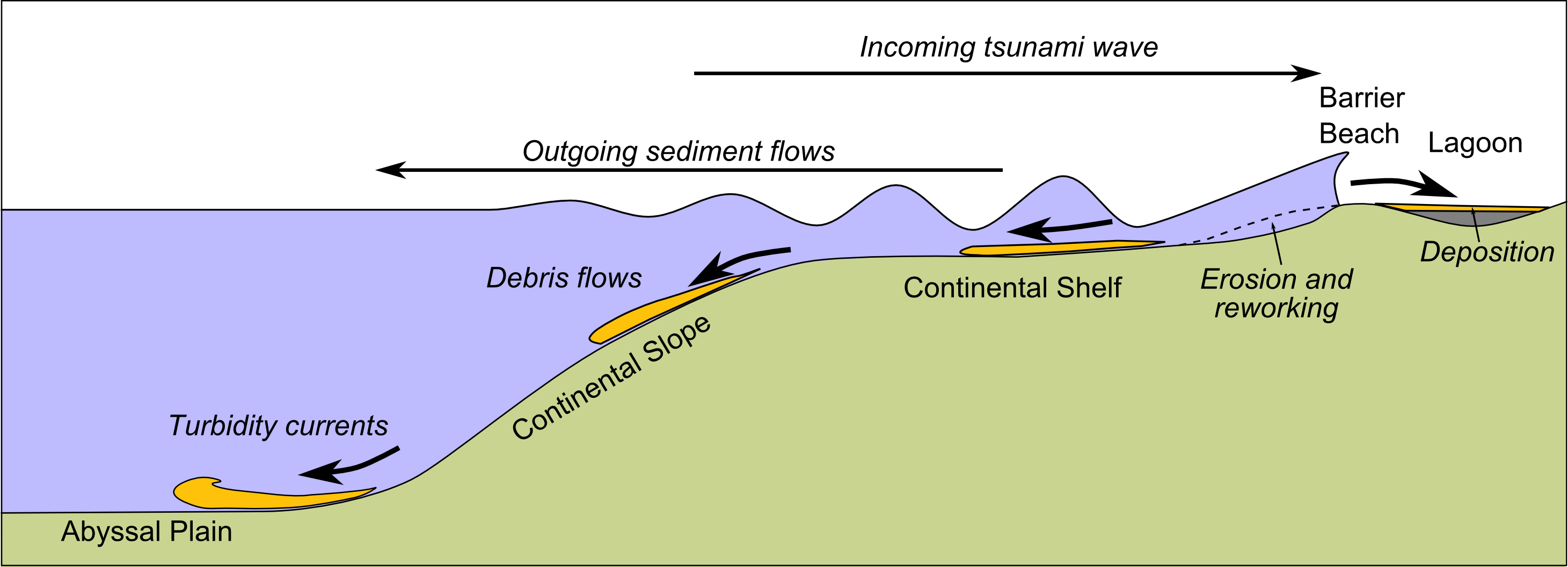
Diagram to show the different depositional environments in which tsunami deposits are formed – partly after Shanmugam 2006

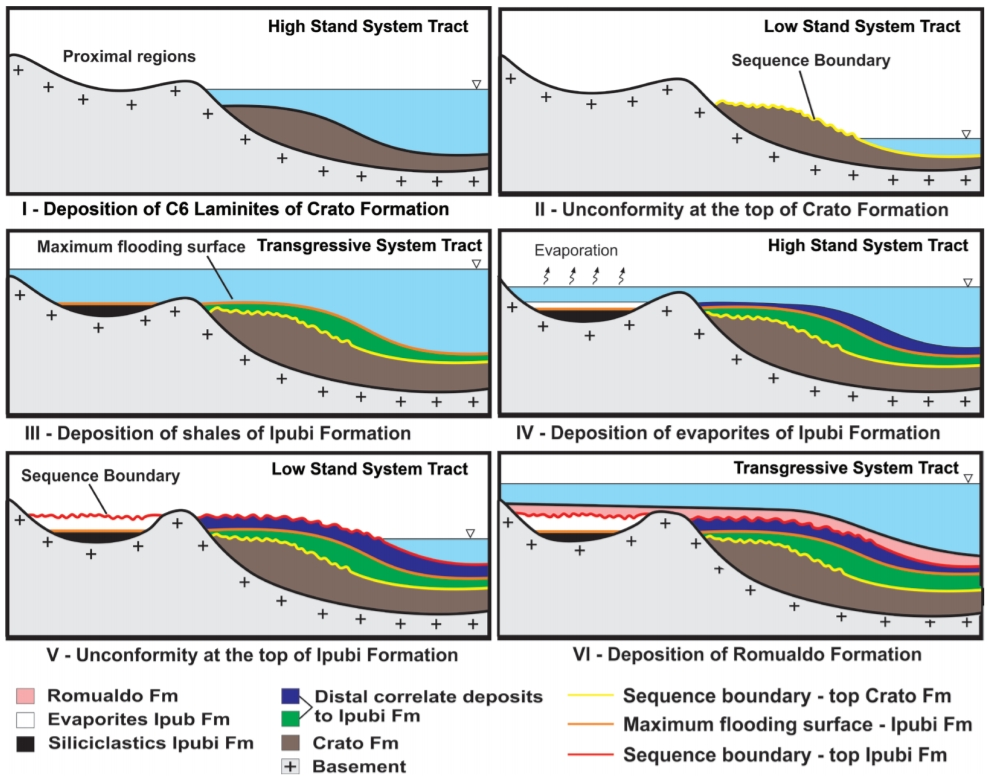
Depositional environmental model of the Araripe Basin formations, NE Brazil

=== Continental ===
- Alluvial – Loose soil or sediment that is eroded and redeposited in a non-marine setting – type of Fluvial deposit. Caused by moving water in a fan shape (Alluvial Fan) and containing mostly impermeable and nonporous sediments well sorted.
- Aeolian – Processes due to wind activity. Often in deserts and coastal regions and well sorted, large scale cross-beds
- Fluvial – Natural flowing freshwater stream – processes due to moving water, mainly streams. Common sediments are gravel, sand, and silt.
- Lacustrine – Sediment deposited by a lake – processes due to moving water, mainly lakes. Common sediments are sand, silt, and clay.

=== Transitional ===
- Deltaic – Silt deposition landform at the mouth of a river (possible cross beds, ripple marks) Common sediments are sand, silt, and clay.
- Tide – Rise and fall of the sea level under astronomical gravitational influences – processes due to tidal currents, creates tidal flats (fine-grained, ripple marks, cross-beds). Common sediments are silt and clay
- Lagoonal – Shallow body of water separated from a larger one by a narrow landform. Little transportation, creates lagoon bottom environment. Common sediments are carbonates (in tropical climates).
- Beach – Area of loose particles at the edge of the sea or other body of water. Caused by waves and longshore currents. Creates beaches, spits, and sandbars with the common sediments of gravel and sand.
- Lake – Large inland body of relatively still water

=== Marine ===
- Shallow water marine environment – Type of marine environment – processes due to waves and tidal currents, creates shelves and slopes, lagoons. Common sediments are carbonates (in tropical climates) or sand, silt, and clay (elsewhere)
  - Upper shoreface – Portion of the seafloor that is shallow enough to be agitated by everyday wave action
  - Lower shoreface – Part of the seafloor undisturbed by waves
- Deep water marine environment – Flat area on the deep ocean floor (abyssal plains) caused by ocean currents. Common sediments are clay, carbonate mud, silica mud.
- Reef – Shoal of rock, coral, or other material lying beneath the surface of water caused by waves and tidal currents. Also creates adjacent basins. Common sediments are carbonates.

=== Others ===
- Evaporite – Water-soluble mineral deposit formed by evaporation from an aqueous solution
- Glacial – Persistent body of ice that moves downhill under its own weight
  - Till – angular to rounded grains, poorly sorted, unstratified (massive)
  - Outwash – ripple marks, cross-beds, similar to stream channel
- Volcanic – Rupture in a planet's crust where material escapes
- Tsunami – Sedimentary unit deposited by a tsunami

== Recognition of depositional environments in ancient sediments ==
Depositional environments in ancient sediments are recognised using a combination of sedimentary facies, facies associations, sedimentary structures and fossils, particularly trace fossil assemblages, as they indicate the environment in which they lived.
