= 1968 Aegean Sea earthquake =

Earthquake affecting Greece and Turkey

- UTC time: 1968-02-19 22:45:45
- ISC event: 826342
- USGS-ANSS: ComCat
- Local date: 20 February 1968
- Local time: 01:45 TRT (UTC+3)
- Magnitude: 7.0 M_{w}^{(USGS)}, 7.4 M_{s}^{(ISC)} (Note: M_{w} 7.0, M_{w} 7.2 M_{s} 7.0, M_{s} 7.1, M_{s} 7.2, M_{s} 7.3, M_{s} 7.4, M_{s} 7.5 mb 6.0, mb 7.1 M_{fa} 7.4 M 7.1)
- Depth: 6.9 km (4.3 mi)
- Epicentre: 39.368°N 24.957°E Central Aegean Sea
- Fault: North Anatolian Fault
- Type: Strike-slip
- Areas affected: Turkey, Greece
- Total damage: $0.6 million USD
- Max. intensity: MMI IX (Violent)
- Peak acceleration: 0.17 g
- Foreshocks: M_{L} 3.2 1 minute prior
- Aftershocks: Over 2800, the largest of which was M_{L} 5.3-5.6
- Casualties: 20 dead, 39 injured

The 1968 Aegean Sea earthquake was a M_{w} 7.0 earthquake that occurred in the early morning hours of February 20, 1968 local time about 57.1 km (35.5 mi) away from Myrina, Greece. This earthquake occurred between mainland Greece and Turkey, meaning both countries were impacted. 20 people died, and 39 people were injured to various degrees. It was the deadliest Greek earthquake since the 1956 Amorgos earthquake.

== Tectonic setting ==
In the central Aegean Sea, the Aegean Sea Plate has a strike-slip boundary with the Anatolian Plate which accommodates deformation from seismic stresses. A large strike slip fault, the North Anatolian Fault in Turkey, developed to more easily allow faulting in the area. A large strand of the North Anatolian Fault branches southwest and traces near the north coast of the Gulf of Edremit. This segment of the fault begins northeast of the gulf, at Lake Manyas. The segment enters the Aegean Sea near the town of Babakale, Ayvacık.

== Earthquake ==
The M_{w} 7.0 earthquake struck nearest to the island of Lemnos, Greece in the middle of the night of February 20. The source parameters of the earthquake indicate right-lateral strike slip faulting along the North Anatolian fault or a similar right lateral extension at the shallow depth of 6.9 km (4.3 mi). The earthquake had faulting dimensions of 60–75 km (37–47 mi) by 10–15 km (6.2–9.3 mi) with an average slip of 1.8–3.2 m (5 ft 11 in – 10 ft 6 in). Surface rupturing was reported on Agios Efstratios island. There were many recorded aftershocks (over 2800), with the largest being M_{L} 5.3–5.6. The earthquake was reportedly felt from as far away as Ankara, Turkey, and Sofia, Bulgaria. A M_{s} 6.5 earthquake in 1967 put stress on the fault that ruptured during this event, and the rupture from this earthquake put strain on two faults: one that ruptured in a M_{s} 7.2 earthquake in 1981, and another fault that hosted a M_{s} 6.9 event in 1982. This earthquake also released stress on nearby faults. Both the fault that ruptured in a M_{s} 6.4 event in late December 1981 and one that ruptured in a M_{s} 6.9 event in 1983 had reduced strain after this earthquake struck.

== Tsunami ==
Despite being a strike slip event, a type of faulting that does not typically favor tsunamigenesis, a 1.2 m (3 ft 11 in) tsunami wave was recorded at the port of Myrina. The cause may have been slumping on western St. Eustratios island.

== Damage ==
The earthquake killed 20 people, severely injured a further 18, while 21 had light injuries. 175 houses collapsed in the earthquake, while another 397 were damaged so severely they could not be repaired. 1951-2348 buildings had some structural damage such as cracks. Some homes on Lemnos were also damaged by the shock. The shaking was compounded with poor building quality and local conditions allowing for shaking amplification. 3600 people became homeless as a result of this earthquake, and a total of 7618 people were affected. As the island of Agios Efstratios is small and rather limited in resources, the island's authorities were unable to provide all of the relief from the disaster effects that were needed in the immediate aftermath of the earthquake. Monetary damage was 600 thousand 1968 dollars, and when adjusted for inflation in 2000, damage from this earthquake amount to 4.674 million dollars.

== See also ==
- List of earthquakes in 1968
- List of earthquakes in Greece
- List of earthquakes in Turkey
