= 1994 offshore Sanriku earthquake =

Earthquake in Japan

- JMA seismic intensity map

- Location within Japan
- UTC time: 1994-12-28 12:19:23
- ISC event: 137333
- USGS-ANSS: ComCat
- Local date: December 28, 1994
- Local time: 21:19
- Magnitude: 7.7 M_{w} 7.5 M_{JMA}
- Depth: 33 km (21 mi)
- Epicenter: 40.451°N 143.491°E
- Areas affected: Japan
- Max. intensity: MMI IX (Violent) JMA 6+
- Peak acceleration: 0.69 g 673.5 Gal
- Tsunami: 55 cm
- Casualties: 3 killed, 788 injured

The 1994 offshore Sanriku earthquake (Japanese: 三陸はるか沖地震 Sanriku Haruka Okijishin) occurred on December 28, 1994, at 12:19 UTC (21:19 JST). This was a magnitude M_{w} 7.7 earthquake with epicenter located in the Pacific Ocean at about 180 km east of Hachinohe, Aomori (haruka-oki means "far offshore"). The intensity reached shindo 6 in Hachinohe, Aomori, about 187.6 km from epicenter. It could be felt in Tokyo, about 632.9 km from epicenter, with shindo 2. The Japanese Meteorological Agency put the magnitude at M_{JMA} 7.5. Slip associated with this earthquake continued for more than a year and it has been termed an 'ultra-slow earthquake'.

== Geology ==
The northern part of Honshu and Hokkaido lie above the convergent plate boundary, where the Pacific plate is subducting beneath the Okhotsk microplate. The convergence rate across this boundary lies in the range of 7.9–9.2 cm per year. The plate interface in the area of the earthquake epicenter shows an abrupt increase in dip from about 5° to about 15°, 80 km landward of the Japan Trench. This part of the plate boundary has been the location of many powerful historical earthquakes, dating back to the 869 Sanriku earthquake and most recently of the devastating 2011 Tōhoku earthquake. Most of these events relate to rupture along the plate interface, but some, such as the 1933 Sanriku earthquake, involved deformation within the subducting plate. According to the studies of past great earthquakes, a weak seismic coupling is suggested in the offshore Sanriku region. From the distribution of past seismicity, the width of coupling at 40°N was assumed to be about 150 km.

In 1999, an investigation was conducted in the source regions of the 1968 offshore Tokachi earthquake and the 1994 offshore Sanriku earthquake. It was found that the structures of crust are heterogeneous in the north and south of 40°10' N. The thickness of the crust is 21 km in the north and 15 km in the south. The P wave velocity in the north is 7% slower than that in the south.

== Earthquake ==
This was an interplate earthquake, with a low-angle reverse fault focal mechanism, which ruptured part of the plate interface. The region of the largest slip in this earthquake coincides with the region of low seismic moment release in the 1968 Offshore Tokachi earthquake on May 16, 1968, implying that the 1994 Offshore Sanriku earthquake completed the incompleted fault slip in the source region of the 1968 Offshore Tokachi earthquake. The average slip of the fault was estimated to be 0.4 m and the maximal slip about 1.2 m.

The slip caused by this earthquake can be divided into a coseismic slip that occurred immediately before, during and immediately after the event, and a long period of slow post-seismic slip that continued for more than a year after the original event. The slow post-seismic slip following this earthquake had a large seismic moment compared with the coseismic slip associated with the main event. The post-seismic slip occurred in two phases; an initial faster short-term phase that lasted for about ten days, terminating with the largest aftershock, followed by a long-term slower phase. The slip area of the initial phase matches the rupture area for the main event. The second phase migrated significantly further down-dip and to the south, along the plate boundary.

The main event released a seismic moment of about 3×10^{20} Nm, corresponding to magnitude M_{w} 7.59. However, the total seismic moment released by the main event and the following slow slip events up to about 1 year thereafter was about 8×10^{20} Nm, which corresponds to magnitude M_{w} 7.84. The seismic moment of the earthquake was put at 4.3×10^{20} Nm by the USGS. The slow slip in the landward side of the source region was found to be larger than that in the trenchward side of the source region.

The maximum accelerations recorded in Hachinohe were 602.3 cm/s^{2} in NS, 488.4 cm/s^{2} in EW, and 94.1 cm/s^{2} in UD.

== Tsunami ==
A local tsunami was triggered by this earthquake. The recorded maximum height of the tsunami was in Miyako, which was about 55 cm. In Ayukawa, Miyagi Prefecture and in Hachinohe, Aomori Prefecture, the tsunami was about 50 cm high. There was no report of damage caused by the tsunami.

== Aftershocks ==
The locations of the most part of the aftershocks were within a 170 km × 84 km region west of the initial break of the main shock. Most of the aftershocks occurred in the region of small slip in the main rupture.

The strongest aftershock occurred on January 6, 1995, at 22:37 UTC (January 7, 1995, at 07:37 local time) with magnitude M_{w} 6.9, leaving 29 people injured. It was located at 40.246 N, 142.175 E with a depth of 27 km. The intensity reached shindo 5 in Hachinohe, Aomori. This aftershock could be felt in Tokyo with shindo 2.

== Damage ==
The felt intensity of the earthquake reached Shindo 6 in Hachinohe and Misawa, Shindo 5 at Aomori, Morioka and Mutsu and Shindo 4 at Miyako, Ofunato, Hakodate, Obihiro, Tomakomai and Urakawa. In the prefectures of Aomori and Iwate, about 69,000 households had no electricity. A total of 6,229 buildings were affected, with 48 completely destroyed, 378 partially destroyed and another 5,803 suffering some damage. The total damage was estimated at 170.4 million US dollars. Three people were reported dead and more than 200 injured; 48 houses were completely destroyed. Road damage and power outages were reported. Liquefaction occurred in the Hachinohe Port area.

== See also ==
- List of earthquakes in 1994
- List of earthquakes in Japan
