= 1968 Sulawesi earthquake =

Earthquake in Indonesia

1968 Sulawesi earthquake and tsunami
- Location within Indonesia Location within Sulawesi
- UTC time: 1968-08-14 22:14:23
- ISC event: 818025
- USGS-ANSS: ComCat
- Local date: August 15, 1968
- Local time: 06:14:23
- Magnitude: 7.4 M_{L} 7.2 M_{w}^{(USGS)}
- Depth: 17 km (11 mi)
- Epicenter: 0.06°N 119.69°E
- Fault: Palu-Koro fault
- Areas affected: Indonesia
- Max. intensity: MMI IX (Violent)
- Casualties: 213 killed

The 1968 Sulawesi earthquake struck Indonesia on August 14. It had a Richter magnitude of 7.4, spawned a large tsunami, and killed roughly 200 people.

== Damage and casualties ==
The earthquake had a Richter magnitude of 7.4. It created a tsunami with wave heights of 8 m (26 ft) to 10 m (33 ft), which soon traveled onto Sulawesi. The most extensive waves reached 300 m (980 ft) inland, destroying 700 homes and killing around 200 people.

== Geology ==
The earthquake ruptured along Palu-Koro fault in Manimbaja Bay. It caused subsidence that decreased elevations by as much as 2 m (6 ft 7 in) to 3 m (9.8 ft) along the coast. It also appeared to uplift at least one of the Togian Islands.

The earthquake was near the Celebes Sea; it sank the island of Tuguan.

== See also ==
- 2018 Sulawesi earthquake and tsunami
- List of earthquakes in 1968
- List of earthquakes in Indonesia
