= List of earthquakes in 1968 =

Earthquakes in 1968
Approximate epicenters of the earthquakes in 1968
- 4.0–5.9 magnitude
- 6.0–6.9 magnitude
- 7.0–7.9 magnitude
- 8.0+ magnitude
- Strongest magnitude: Japan, off the east coast of Honshu (Magnitude 8.2) May 16
- Deadliest: Iran, South Khorasan province (Magnitude 7.1) August 31 10,488 deaths
- Total fatalities: 12,081

Number by magnitude
- 9.0+: 0

This is a list of earthquakes in 1968. Only magnitude 6.0 or greater earthquakes appear on the list. Lower magnitude events are included if they have caused death, injury or damage. Events which occurred in remote areas will be excluded from the list as they wouldn't have generated significant media interest. All dates are listed according to UTC time. Maximum intensities are indicated on the Mercalli intensity scale and are sourced from United States Geological Survey (USGS) ShakeMap data. There was a large resurgence in activity in 1968. 22 magnitude 7.0+ earthquakes struck various parts of the planet. The largest of these was a magnitude 8.2 event in Japan in May. Large aftershocks struck the area following the mainshock. New Zealand and Indonesia had some upheaval during the year. The high activity contributed to over 12,000 deaths across the world. The vast majority of this total was caused by a destructive event in Iran in August with nearly 10,500 deaths. Events in the Philippines, Italy and Indonesia also had significant fatalities.

== Overall ==
=== By death toll ===
Rank	Death toll	Magnitude	Location	MMI	Depth (km)	Date
1	10,488	7.1	Iran, South Khorasan province	IX (Violent)	10.0	August 31
2	700	6.2	Iran, Razavi Khorasan province	VIII (Severe)	15.0	September 1
3	270	7.6	Philippines, Luzon	IX (Violent)	25.0	August 1
4	216	6.4	Italy, Sicily	X (Extreme)	10.0	January 15
5	200	7.2	Indonesia, Minahassa Peninsula	IX (Violent)	20.0	August 14
6	52	8.2	Japan, off the east coast of Honshu	VIII (Severe)	29.9	May 16
7	38	5.3	Iran, West Azerbaijan province	VII (Very strong)	34.0	April 29
8	24	6.3	Turkey, offshore Bartin Province	VII (Very strong)	20.0	September 3
= 9	20	7.2	Greece, Aegean Sea	X (Extreme)	15.0	February 19
= 9	20	6.0	Mexico, Chiapas	IV (Light)	124.8	September 25
10	18	7.3	Mexico, Oaxaca	VIII (Severe)	25.0	August 2
11	15	6.8	Peru, Loreto Region	VII (Very strong)	15.0	June 19

- Note: At least 10 casualties

=== By magnitude ===
Rank	Magnitude	Death toll	Location	MMI	Depth (km)	Date
1	8.2	52	Japan, off the east coast of Honshu	VIII (Severe)	29.9	May 16
2	7.9	0	Japan, off the northeast coast of Honshu	VII (Very strong)	25.0	May 16
= 3	7.6	270	Philippines, Luzon	IX (Violent)	25.0	August 1
= 3	7.6	0	Indonesia, Molucca Sea	IX (Violent)	23.0	August 10
= 4	7.5	1	Japan, off the east coast of Kyushu	VIII (Severe)	34.2	April 1
= 4	7.5	0	Indonesia, Papua (province)	VIII (Severe)	45.0	May 28
5	7.4	0	Soviet Union, Kuril Islands, Russia	VII (Very strong)	36.9	January 29
= 6	7.3	0	Australia, southeast of New Ireland (island), Papua and New Guinea	VIII (Severe)	30.0	February 12
= 6	7.3	0	New Zealand, Kermadec Islands	VI (Strong)	45.0	July 25
= 6	7.3	18	Mexico, Oaxaca	VIII (Severe)	25.0	August 2
= 6	7.3	0	United Kingdom, Solomon Islands	( )	543.1	August 18
= 6	7.3	0	Japan, Bonin Islands	( )	500.0	October 7
= 7	7.2	20	Greece, Aegean Sea	X (Extreme)	15.0	February 19
= 7	7.2	3	New Zealand, South Island	IX (Violent)	20.0	May 24
= 7	7.2	200	Indonesia, Minahassa Peninsula	IX (Violent)	20.0	August 14
= 8	7.1	0	Taiwan, off the east coast of	VII (Very strong)	25.0	February 26
= 8	7.1	10,488	Iran, South Khorasan province	X (Extreme)	10.0	August 31
= 8	7.1	0	New Zealand, Kermadec Islands	( )	50.0	September 26
= 9	7.0	0	New Zealand, Kermadec Islands	( )	55.0	May 20
= 9	7.0	0	Soviet Union, Kuril Islands, Russia	( )	28.3	May 20
= 9	7.0	0	Japan, off the east coast of Honshu	VI (Strong)	32.1	June 12
= 9	7.0	0	Australia, off the north coast of mainland Papua and New Guinea	VIII (Severe)	15.0	October 23

- Note: At least 7.0 magnitude

== Notable events ==
=== January ===
January
- Strongest magnitude: 7.4 M_{w} Soviet Union, Russia
- Deadliest: 6.4 M_{w} Italy; 216 deaths
- Total fatalities: 224

Number by magnitude
- 8.0–8.9: 0
- 7.0–7.9: 1
- 6.0–6.9: 6
- 5.0–5.9: 1

Date	Country and location	M_{w}	Depth (km)	MMI	Notes	Casualties	
Date	Country and location	M_{w}	Depth (km)	MMI	Notes	Dead	Injured
4	Nicaragua, Managua	4.6	5.0		Despite being a moderate magnitude there was some property damage. Costs were $2 million (1968 rate).		
6	Chile, Atacama Region	6.4	30.0	VI			
13	Taiwan, off the east coast	6.1	35.0	IV			
15	Italy, Sicily	6.4	10.0	X	216 people were killed and 563 were injured in the 1968 Belice earthquake. Extensive destruction was caused in the area with costs reported at $320 million (1968 rate).	216	563
19	United Kingdom, Solomon Islands	6.7	27.5	V			
25	Italy, Sicily	5.1	33.0		8 people were killed and 55 more were injured. Some damage was reported. Aftershock.	8	55
26	Indonesia, Flores	6.8	30.6	VI			
29	Soviet Union, Kuril Islands, Russia	7.4	36.9	VII			
29	Soviet Union, Kuril Islands, Russia	6.1	33.0		Aftershock.		

=== February ===
February
- Strongest magnitude: 7.3 M_{w} Australia, Papua and New Guinea
- Deadliest: 7.2 M_{w} Greece; 20 deaths
- Total fatalities: 24

Number by magnitude
- 8.0–8.9: 0
- 7.0–7.9: 3
- 6.0–6.9: 2

Date	Country and location	M_{w}	Depth (km)	MMI	Notes	Casualties	
Date	Country and location	M_{w}	Depth (km)	MMI	Notes	Dead	Injured
4	Soviet Union, Kuril Islands, Russia	6.6	23.5		Aftershock.		
12	Australia, southeast of New Ireland (island), Papua and New Guinea	7.3	30.0	VIII	Some damage was reported.		
19	Greece, Aegean Sea	7.2	15.0	X	The 1968 Aegean Sea earthquake killed 20 people and injured 18 more. 500 homes were destroyed and 1,951 were damaged. Costs were $600,000 (1968 rate).	20	18
21	Japan, Miyazaki Prefecture, Kyushu	6.2	10.0	VII	During the 1968 Ebino earthquake, 3 people were killed and some damage was reported.	3	
25	Algeria, Bordj Bou Arreridj Province	4.9	0.0	VIII	1 person was killed and 4 were hurt. 100 homes collapsed.	1	4
26	Taiwan, off the east coast of	7.1	25.0	VII			

=== March ===
March
- Strongest magnitude: 6.4 M_{w} Tonga
- Deadliest: 4.6 M_{w} Kenya; 1 death
- Total fatalities: 1

Number by magnitude
- 8.0–8.9: 0
- 7.0–7.9: 0
- 6.0–6.9: 4

Date	Country and location	M_{w}	Depth (km)	MMI	Notes	Casualties	
Date	Country and location	M_{w}	Depth (km)	MMI	Notes	Dead	Injured
5	Philippines, off the east coast of Mindanao	6.3	35.0	V			
5	Philippines, off the east coast of Mindanao	6.1	35.0	V	Aftershock.		
7	Australia, East New Britain Province, Papua and New Guinea	6.3	45.0	V			
11	Tonga	6.4	109.1				
20	Kenya, Homa Bay County	4.6	33.0		1 person was killed and another was injured. Some property damage was caused.	1	1

=== April ===
April
- Strongest magnitude: 7.5 M_{w} Japan
- Deadliest: 5.3 M_{w} Iran; 38 deaths
- Total fatalities: 39

Number by magnitude
- 8.0–8.9: 0
- 7.0–7.9: 1
- 6.0–6.9: 4
- 5.0–5.9: 1

Date	Country and location	M_{w}	Depth (km)	MMI	Notes	Casualties	
Date	Country and location	M_{w}	Depth (km)	MMI	Notes	Dead	Injured
1	Japan, off the east coast of Kyushu	7.5	34.2	VIII	1 person was killed and 22 were injured in the 1968 Hyuga-nada earthquake. Some homes were destroyed in both the earthquake and a subsequent tsunami.	1	22
1	Japan, off the east coast of Kyushu	6.8	30.0	VI	Aftershock.		
9	United States, southern California	6.6	10.0	IX	Some damage was caused by the 1968 Borrego Mountain earthquake.		
26	Western Samoa	6.2	30.0				
26	Mexico, Michoacan	6.1	30.0	VI			
29	Iran, West Azerbaijan province	5.3	34.0	VII	38 people were killed and 100 were injured. 1,000 homes were destroyed. Damage costs were $1 million (1968 rate).	38	100

=== May ===
May
- Strongest magnitude: 8.2 M_{w} Japan
- Deadliest: 8.2 M_{w} Japan; 52 deaths
- Total fatalities: 55

Number by magnitude
- 8.0–8.9: 1
- 7.0–7.9: 5
- 6.0–6.9: 6

Date	Country and location	M_{w}	Depth (km)	MMI	Notes	Casualties	
Date	Country and location	M_{w}	Depth (km)	MMI	Notes	Dead	Injured
14	Japan, Ryukyu Islands	6.7	160.1	V			
16	Japan, off the east coast of Honshu	8.2	29.9	VIII	52 people were killed and 330 were injured in the 1968 Tokachi earthquake. A tsunami was generated which contributed to the destruction. 1,218 homes were destroyed. Damage costs were $131 million (1968 rate). A large number of aftershocks followed. To prevent cluttering only those measuring above magnitude 6.5 will be listed.	52	330
16	Japan, off the northeast coast of Honshu	7.9	25.0	VII	Aftershock.		
16	Japan, off the east coast of Honshu	6.5	25.0		Aftershock.		
16	Japan, off the east coast of Honshu	6.5	43.0		Aftershock.		
19	Japan, off the east coast of Honshu	6.3	20.0		South of the aftershock sequence from May 16 event.		
20	New Zealand, Kermadec Islands	7.0	55.0	rowspan="2"| Doublet earthquake.			
20	New Zealand, Kermadec Islands	6.9	50.0				
20	Soviet Union, Kuril Islands, Russia	7.0	28.3				
23	New Zealand, South Island	7.2	20.0	IX	The 1968 Inangahua earthquake caused 3 deaths and $3 million (1968 rate) worth of damage.	3	
24	Japan, off the east coast of Honshu	6.6	27.6		Aftershock.		
28	Indonesia, Papua (province)	7.5	45.0	VIII			

=== June ===
June
- Strongest magnitude: 7.0 M_{w} Japan
- Deadliest: 6.8 M_{w} Peru; 15 deaths
- Total fatalities: 15

Number by magnitude
- 8.0–8.9: 0
- 7.0–7.9: 1
- 6.0–6.9: 3

Date	Country and location	M_{w}	Depth (km)	MMI	Notes	Casualties	
Date	Country and location	M_{w}	Depth (km)	MMI	Notes	Dead	Injured
7	Indonesia, Central Sulawesi	6.7	35.0	VII			
7	Indonesia, South Sulawesi	6.2	38.0	VI	Aftershock.		
12	Japan, off the east coast of Honshu	7.0	32.1	VI	Aftershock of May 16 event.		
19	Peru, Loreto Region	6.8	15.0	VII	15 people were killed and some property damage was caused. Costs were $100,000 (1968 rate).	15	

=== July ===
July
- Strongest magnitude: 7.3 M_{w} New Zealand
- Total fatalities: 0

Number by magnitude
- 8.0–8.9: 0
- 7.0–7.9: 1
- 6.0–6.9: 6

Date	Country and location	M_{w}	Depth (km)	MMI	Notes	Casualties	
Date	Country and location	M_{w}	Depth (km)	MMI	Notes	Dead	Injured
1	Japan, Saitama Prefecture, Honshu	6.1	60.6	VI			
2	Mexico, Guerrero	6.4	57.9	VI			
2	Indonesia, Papua (province)	6.0	45.0	V			
5	Japan, off the east coast of Honshu	6.3	47.0	IV			
25	New Zealand, Kermadec Islands	7.3	45.0	VI	Some damage was caused.		
29	Indonesia, West Papua (province)	6.2	20.0	V			
30	Peru, off the north coast of	6.5	31.8	VI			

=== August ===
August
- Strongest magnitude: 7.6 M_{w} 2 events
- Deadliest: 7.1 M_{w} Iran; 10,488 deaths
- Total fatalities: 10,976

Number by magnitude
- 8.0–8.9: 0
- 7.0–7.9: 6
- 6.0–6.9: 9
- 5.0–5.9: 0

Date	Country and location	M_{w}	Depth (km)	MMI	Notes	Casualties	
Date	Country and location	M_{w}	Depth (km)	MMI	Notes	Dead	Injured
1	Philippines, Luzon	7.6	25.0	IX	The 1968 Casiguran earthquake caused 270 deaths and 261 injuries. Some homes were destroyed and many were damaged. Costs were around $8 million (1968 rate). A tsunami was generated which left 1 person dead.	270	261
2	Mexico, Oaxaca	7.3	25.0	VIII	18 people were killed. Property damage was $2.4 million (1968 rate).	18	
3	Japan, Ryukyu Islands	6.7	15.0	VI			
3	Philippines, Luzon	6.4	25.0	VI	Aftershock.		
4	Philippines, off the east coast of Mindanao	6.1	100.0	IV			
5	Japan, off the west coast of Shikoku	6.8	45.7	VII			
10	Indonesia, Molucca Sea	7.6	23.0	IX	Some damage was caused.		
10	Indonesia, Molucca Sea	6.5	25.0		Aftershock.		
14	Mexico, offshore Michoacan	6.0	20.0	VI			
14	Indonesia, Minahassa Peninsula	7.2	20.0	IX	200 people were killed and 58 were injured in a tsunami triggered by the 1968 Sulawesi earthquake. 800 homes were destroyed.	200	58
18	United Kingdom, Solomon Islands	7.3	543.1	III			
21	New Zealand, Kermadec Islands	6.5	15.0				
23	Bolivia, Tarija Department	6.3	533.6				
28	Philippines, off the east coast of Luzon	6.4	20.0	V	Aftershock.		
31	Iran, South Khorasan province	7.1	10.0	X	The 1968 Dasht-e Bayaz and Ferdows earthquakes caused major destruction in northeast Iran. 10,488 people were killed and over 17,000 were injured. 12,000 homes were destroyed. $35 million (1968 rate) of costs were reported.	10,488	17,000

=== September ===
September
- Strongest magnitude: 7.1 M_{w} New Zealand
- Deadliest: 6.2 M_{w} Iran; 700 deaths
- Total fatalities: 747

Number by magnitude
- 8.0–8.9: 0
- 7.0–7.9: 1
- 6.0–6.9: 13

Date	Country and location	M_{w}	Depth (km)	MMI	Notes	Casualties	
Date	Country and location	M_{w}	Depth (km)	MMI	Notes	Dead	Injured
1	Iran, Razavi Khorasan province	6.2	15.0	VIII	This was a strong aftershock of the 1968 Dasht-e Bayaz and Ferdows earthquakes. 700 additional deaths were caused and 1,500 homes were destroyed.	700	
3	Turkey, offshore Bartin Province	6.3	20.0	VIII	24 people were killed and 200 were injured. 2,000 homes damaged or destroyed.	24	200
8	Australia, East Sepik Province, Papua and New Guinea	6.3	30.0	VI			
9	Peru, Ucayali Region	6.1	142.3	IV			
14	Iran, Fars province	6.2	25.0	VII			
16	Australia, off the south coast of New Britain, Papua and New Guinea	6.8	35.0	VII			
16	Australia, off the south coast of New Britain, Papua and New Guinea	6.1	65.0	V	Aftershock.		
20	Venezuela, Sucre, Venezuela	6.5	103.4	IX	3 people were killed and some damage was caused.	3	
21	Japan, off the south coast of Hokkaido	6.7	58.3	VI			
25	New Zealand, off the south coast of South Island	6.2	15.0				
25	Mexico, Chiapas	6.0	124.8	IV	20 people were killed and some damage was caused.	20	
26	New Zealand, Kermadec Islands	7.1	50.0				
27	Australia, East Sepik Province, Papua and New Guinea	6.4	15.0	VIII			
28	Peru, Lima Region	6.1	65.0	V			

=== October ===
October
- Strongest magnitude: 7.3 M_{w} Japan
- Total fatalities: 0

Number by magnitude
- 8.0–8.9: 0
- 7.0–7.9: 2
- 6.0–6.9: 6

Date	Country and location	M_{w}	Depth (km)	MMI	Notes	Casualties	
Date	Country and location	M_{w}	Depth (km)	MMI	Notes	Dead	Injured
7	Japan, Bonin Islands	7.3	500.0				
7	Japan, off the south coast of Hokkaido	6.5	35.0	VI			
10	Australia, off the south coast of New Britain, Papua and New Guinea	6.1	48.9	V			
14	Australia, Western Australia	6.5	15.0	IX	The 1968 Meckering earthquake caused property damage with costs reaching $2.2 million (1968 rate).		
20	Taiwan, off the east coast of	6.2	22.5	V			
23	Australia, off the coast of East Sepik Province, Papua and New Guinea	7.0	15.0	VIII	Some damage was caused.		
24	Philippines, southeast of Mindanao	6.3	45.0				
29	United States, northern Alaska	6.7	10.0	VIII			

=== November ===
November
- Strongest magnitude: 6.5 M_{w} New Hebrides, Vanuatu
- Total fatalities: 0

Number by magnitude
- 8.0–8.9: 0
- 7.0–7.9: 0
- 6.0–6.9: 3

Date	Country and location	M_{w}	Depth (km)	MMI	Notes	Casualties	
Date	Country and location	M_{w}	Depth (km)	MMI	Notes	Dead	Injured
4	New Hebrides, Vanuatu	6.5	597.0				
17	Venezuela, Zulia	6.1	175.7				
22	Philippines, Luzon	6.1	35.0	V			

=== December ===
December
- Strongest magnitude: 6.6 M_{w} Australia, Papua and New Guinea
- Total fatalities: 0

Number by magnitude
- 8.0–8.9: 0
- 7.0–7.9: 0
- 6.0–6.9: 5

Date	Country and location	M_{w}	Depth (km)	MMI	Notes	Casualties	
Date	Country and location	M_{w}	Depth (km)	MMI	Notes	Dead	Injured
5	Greece, Dodecanese Islands	6.1	20.0	VI			
5	Iceland, Southern Peninsula (Iceland)	6.0	10.0	VIII			
7	Australia, Bismarck Sea, Papua and New Guinea	6.6	15.0				
17	United States, southern Alaska	6.3	109.6	V			
19	Soviet Union, eastern Kamchatka, Russia	6.0	44.1	V			
