= 1968 Dasht-e Bayaz and Ferdows earthquakes =

Earthquakes in Iran

- Location within Iran
- UTC time: 1968-08-31 10:47:43
- ISC event: 818488
- USGS-ANSS: ComCat
- Local date: 31 August 1968
- Local time: 14:17:43
- Duration: 1–2 minutes
- Magnitude: 7.1 M_{w}
- Epicenter: 34.02°N 58.96°E
- Areas affected: Iran
- Max. intensity: MMI X (Extreme)
- Aftershocks: 6.4 M_{w} Sept 1 at 07:27
- Casualties: 15,900 dead

The Dasht-e Bayaz and Ferdows earthquakes (Persian: زمین‌لرزه ۱۳۴۷ دشت بیاض و زمین لرزه فردوس) occurred in Dashte Bayaz, Kakhk and Ferdows, Iran in late August and early September 1968. The mainshock measured 7.1 on the moment magnitude scale and had a maximum perceived intensity of X (Extreme) on the Mercalli intensity scale. Damage was heavy in the affected areas with thousands of lives lost in the first event and many hundreds more in the second strong event.

== Tectonic setting ==
The Iranian plateau is confined by the Turan platform in the north and the Zagros fold and thrust belt and Makran Trench in the south. The Arabian plate is converging to the north with the Eurasian plate at a rate of 35 millimeters (1.4 in) per year, and is diffused across a 1,000 km (620 mi) zone resulting in continental shortening and thickening throughout the plateau, with strike-slip and reverse faulting present, as well as subduction at the Makran coast.

In eastern Iran, the shortening is accommodate by a combination of relatively short northwest–southeast trending reverse faults, long north–south trending right lateral strike-slip faults and shorter west–east trending left-lateral strike-slip faults.

== Earthquakes ==
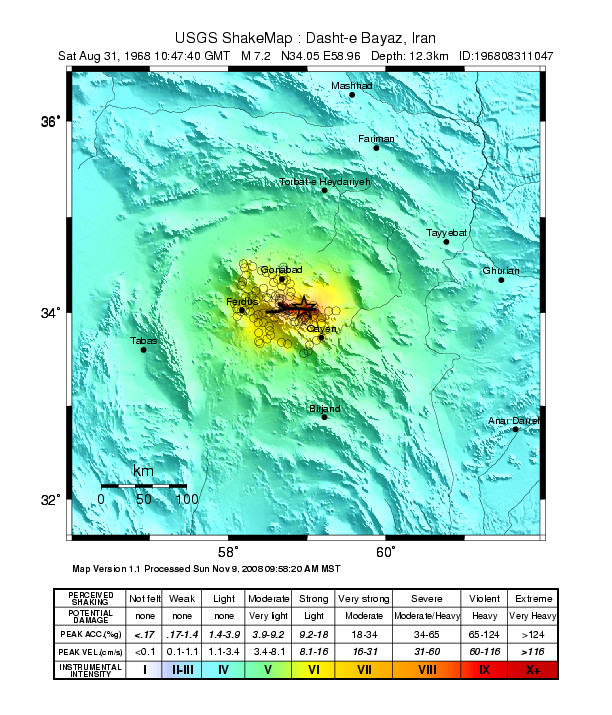
USGS Shakemap for the 31 August event

The first earthquake occurred on 31 August 1968, measuring 7.1 on the moment magnitude scale. The focal mechanism indicated strike-slip faulting and the observed 80 km surface rupture showed that this earthquake resulted from movement on the western part of the west–east trending left-lateral Dasht-e-Bayaz Fault. The greatest observed left-lateral coseismic offset was about 4.5 m, with 2 m being the average observed offset. The western end of the Dasht-e-Bayaz Fault ruptured and produced another large earthquake in 1979.

== Damage ==
The mainshock destroyed five villages in the Dasht-e Bayaz area, and at least half of the buildings in another six villages from Kakhk to Sarayan. A strong aftershock on 1 September, measuring 6.4 on the moment magnitude scale, destroyed Ferdows. More than 175 villages were destroyed or damaged in this earthquake.

== See also ==
- List of earthquakes in 1968
- List of earthquakes in Iran
