= 1968 Ebino earthquake =

Earthquake in Japan

- えびの地震
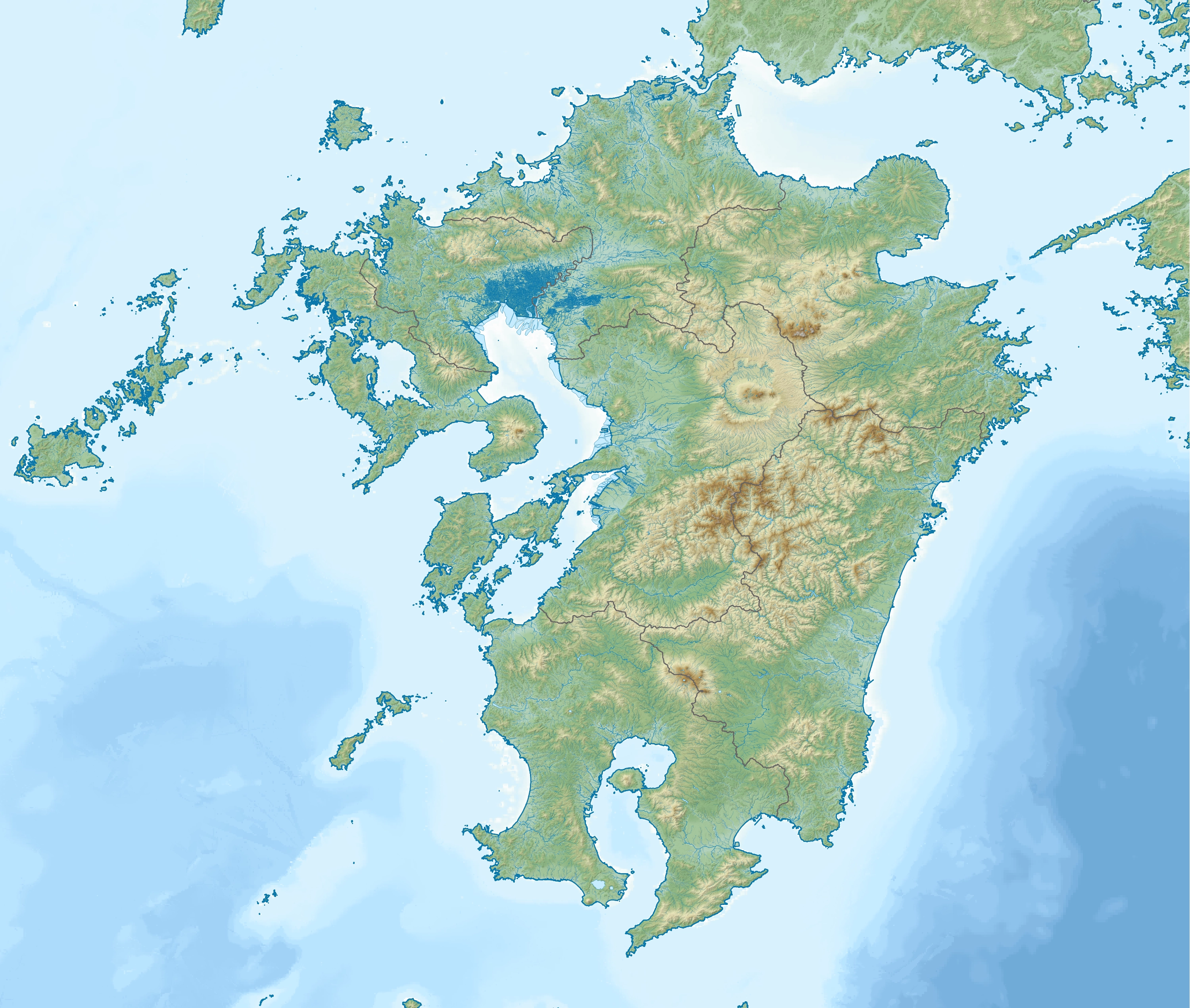
- Location within Kyushu Location within Japan
- UTC time: 1968-02-21 01:44
- ISC event: 826420
- USGS-ANSS: ComCat
- Local date: February 21, 1968
- Local time: 10:44 (JST)
- Magnitude: 6.1 M_{JMA} 6.2 M_{w}
- Epicenter: 32.0°N 130.7°E
- Max. intensity: MMI VII (Very strong)
- Casualties: 3 dead, 42 injured

The 1968 Ebino earthquake (Japanese: えびの地震) is an earthquake that occurred on February 21, 1968, near the border between Miyazaki, Kumamoto and Kagoshima Prefectures in Japan. Moment magnitude was 6.2. The earthquake left three people dead and 42 people injured.

== See also ==
- List of earthquakes in 1968
- List of earthquakes in Japan
