= 1968 Bartın earthquake =

- Location within Turkey
- UTC time: 1968-09-03 08:19:56
- ISC event: 816634
- USGS-ANSS: ComCat
- Local date: September 3, 1968
- Local time: 10:19:56
- Magnitude: 6.2 M_{w}^{(ISC)}
- Depth: 20 km (12 mi)
- Epicenter: 41.86°N 32.46°E
- Type: Thrust
- Max. intensity: MMI VIII (Severe)
- Tsunami: One runup at 3 metres (9.8 ft)
- Casualties: 24–29 deaths and 200 injured

The 1968 Bartın earthquake occurred at 10:19:56 on September 3 with a moment magnitude of 6.3 and a maximum Mercalli Intensity of VIII (Severe). The thrust shock resulted in 24 to 29 deaths and 200 injuries. A tsunami was generated in the Black Sea with a maximum runup height of 3 metres (9.8 ft). A comprehensive catalogue of tsunamis on the Turkish coast lists the 1968 Amasra event as a definite tsunami, noting inundation distances of 50–100 m along the Amasra–Çakraz shoreline, and ranks it among the most significant Black Sea tsunamis of the 20th century.

== Earthquake ==
The shock originated on the coast of the Black Sea near Amasra and damage to stone masonry homes was considered heavy between Amasra and Bartin. Ground effects included rock slides, liquefaction, and downslope spreading near rivers. Beaches were raised 40 centimetres (16 in) near Amasra and Cape Cakraz, and a 3 metres (9.8 ft) tsunami caused flooding.

In addition to the heavy damage to stone masonry homes between Amasra and Bartın and the tsunami run-up, seismological studies show that the mainshock resulted from movement on a shallow, southeast-dipping thrust fault beneath the southern Black Sea margin. A thrust fault is a type of reverse fault in which the upper crustal block is pushed up and over the lower block. Waveform inversions of long-period compressional (P) and shear (SH) waves indicate the fault plane strikes roughly northeast–southwest (strike ≈ 28°), dips at about 38° to the southeast and slipped with a near-vertical motion (rake ≈ 80°). The average depth of slip (centroid depth) was only ≈ 4 km, and released about 3.9 × 10^{25} dyn·cm of seismic moment—a standard measure of an earthquake's total energy—which corresponds to a moment magnitude of 6.3.

Strong aftershock activity followed: nine aftershocks of magnitude 4.0–4.6 were reported by the International Seismological Centre, five of which occurred on the day of the mainshock. At the nearest station in Kastamonu (roughly 120 km southeast), 256 aftershocks were recorded in the first 24 hours and over 500 within the first week, contributing to widespread alarm and hampering rescue and recovery efforts.

Field observations immediately after the earthquake documented up to 0.4 m of coastal uplift near Amasra and numerous landslides, cracks in alluvial deposits and localised ground liquefaction, consistent with the inferred reverse-fault motion. Geological mapping and multichannel seismic reflection profiles show a system of southeast-dipping reverse faults running roughly parallel to the modern coastline about 10 km offshore, implicating active north–south compression of this back-arc basin margin.

== See also ==
- List of earthquakes in 1968
- List of earthquakes in Turkey
