= Tsunami deposit =

Sedimentary unit deposited by a tsunami

Depositional environments in which deposits are formed associated with a tsunami

A tsunami deposit (the term tsunamiite is also sometimes used) is a sedimentary unit deposited as the result of a tsunami. Such deposits may be left onshore during the inundation phase or offshore during the 'backwash' phase. Such deposits are used to identify past tsunami events and thereby better constrain estimates of both earthquake and tsunami hazards. There remain considerable problems, however, in distinguishing between deposits caused by tsunamis and those caused by storms or other sedimentary processes.

== Tsunamiite ==
The term "tsunamiite" or "tsunamite" was introduced in the 1980s to describe deposits interpreted to have been formed by traction processes associated with tsunamis and is particularly used for marine deposits formed during the "backwash" phase. The term's application has broadened to encompass all tsunami-related deposits, but its use has been challenged. The main criticism of the term is that it describes deposits that have formed by many different processes that are not necessarily unique to deposition related to tsunamis, but it remains in use.

== Recognition ==
=== Onshore ===
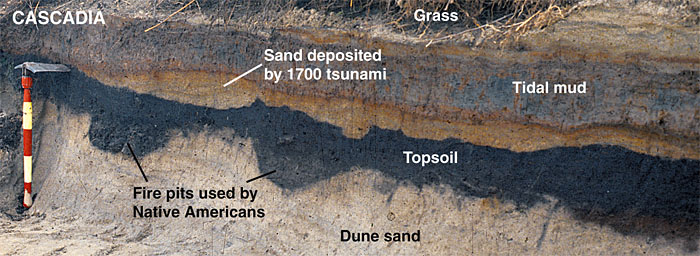
Sandsheet thought to have resulted from the tsunami caused by an earthquake on January 26, 1700, river bank Oregon

The deposits from well-recorded historical tsunamis can be compared with those from well-recorded storm events. In both cases, these overwash deposits are found in low-lying areas behind the coastline, such as lagoons. These depositional environments are generally characterised by slow lacustrine to swamp sedimentation, producing a sequence of fine-grained sediments. Both tsunami deposits and storm deposits may have strongly erosive bases and mainly consist of sand, often with shell fragments. The most reliable indicator of a tsunami origin appears to be the extent of the inundation, with tsunamis generally inundating further than storms on a particular coast. In some cases, tsunami deposits show clear separation into distinct sub-units deposited by successive tsunami waves, whereas storm waves normally show a higher number of sub-divisions. The presence of material eroded from the shelf is considered more likely to suggest a tsunami rather than a storm event due to the much greater energy and erosive power associated with individual waves in the tsunami. The movement of large boulders has also been used to argue for a tsunami origin, but probably only the largest boulders represent good evidence of this as major storms, such as cyclones are known to be able to move large boulders. The amount of movement is also likely to be greater with tsunami waves due to their much longer period.

=== Offshore ===
Sediment entrained in the tsunami wave that is not deposited onshore may either settle out in the shallow water or become involved in debris flows, possibly becoming turbidity currents as velocities increase downslope. Shallow water sediments may also be influenced by major storm events, which like a tsunami, will rework sediment from around the shoreline and redeposit them within the shelf environment. Debris flows and turbidites may be formed by slope failures, which may themselves be directly triggered by the earthquake. There are as yet no unequivocal criteria available for identifying the trigger for such uncommon depositional events.

== Use ==
The recognition and dating of tsunami deposits is an important part of paleoseismology. The extent of a particular deposit may help to judge the magnitude of a known historical earthquake or to act as evidence of a prehistoric event. In the case of the 869 Sanriku earthquake, the identification of tsunami deposits over 4.5 km inland on the Sendai Plain, dated quite closely to a historical tsunami event, enabled the magnitude of this earthquake to be estimated and the likely rupture area offshore located. Two earlier deposits with similar character were identified and dated. The three deposits were used to suggest a return period for large tsunamigenic earthquakes along the Sendai coast of about 1,000 years, suggesting that a repeat of this event was overdue and that large scale inundation was likely. In 2007, the likelihood of a great tsunamigenic earthquake striking this coast in the next 30 years was given as 99%. Based partly on this information TEPCO revised estimates of likely tsunami heights at the Fukushima Daiichi Nuclear Power Plant to greater than 9 m, but took no immediate action. The tsunami triggered by the 2011 Tohoku earthquake had a wave height at Fukushima of about 15 m, well above the 5.7 m for which the plant's defences had been designed. The inundation distance of the tsunami was almost identical to that reported for the three earlier events, as was the lateral extent.
