= Sanriku Coast =

Coastal region of Japan

Coordinates: 39.9706°N 141.9542°E

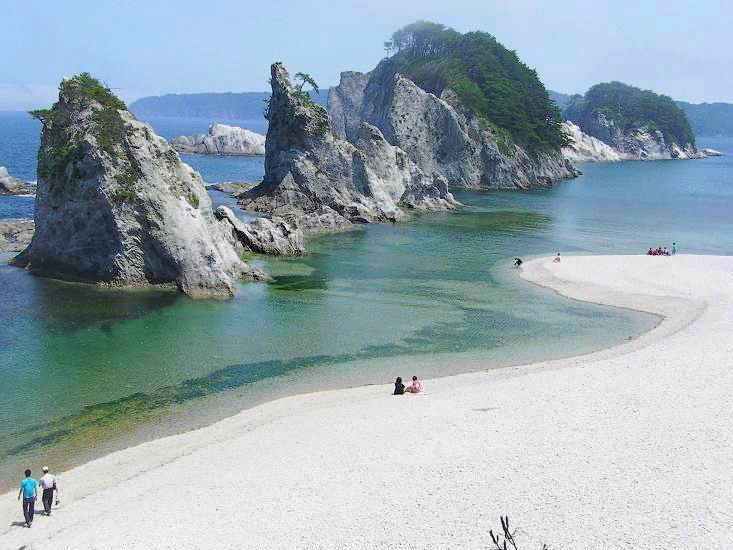
Jōdo-ga-hama at the Rikuchu Kaigan National Park in 2007

The Sanriku Coast (三陸海岸, sanriku kaigan) is a coastal region on the Pacific Ocean, extending from southern Aomori Prefecture, through Iwate Prefecture and northern Miyagi Prefecture in northeastern Honshū, which is Japan's main island. The name comes from the historical region of Sanriku (lit. "three riku"), referring to the former provinces of Rikuō, Rikuchū and Rikuzen.

== Tourist destination ==
There are the Tanesashi Coast, the Rikuchu Kaigan National Park and the Minami-Sanriku Kinkazan Quasi-National Park in the Sanriku Coast region.

== Earthquakes and tsunami ==
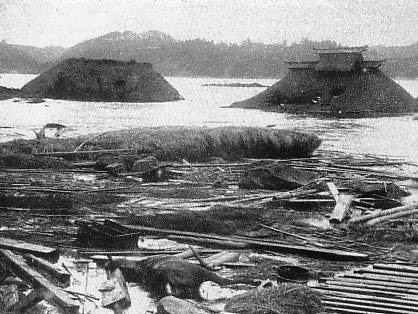
In 1896, devastation following the tsunami

The bays of this ria coastline tend to amplify the destructiveness of tsunami waves. Significant events which devastated coastal communities include:

- 869 Jogan Sanriku earthquake
- 1611 Keicho Sanriku earthquake
- 1700 Cascadia earthquake
- 1896 Meiji Sanriku earthquake
- 1933 Showa Sanriku earthquake
- 1960 Valdivia earthquake
- 2011 Tōhoku earthquake and tsunami

Prior to 2011, the tsunami history of Sanriku might have been interpreted as a story of progressively fewer casualties due to human intervention and planning. The 2011 disaster created a new baseline for analysis of regularly occurring tsunamis.

== See also ==
- Sanriku Railway
- Sanriku, Iwate
- Tōhoku region
- Tōsandō
