= 1968 Tokachi earthquake =

8.3 magnitude earthquake

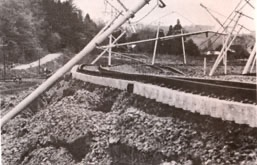

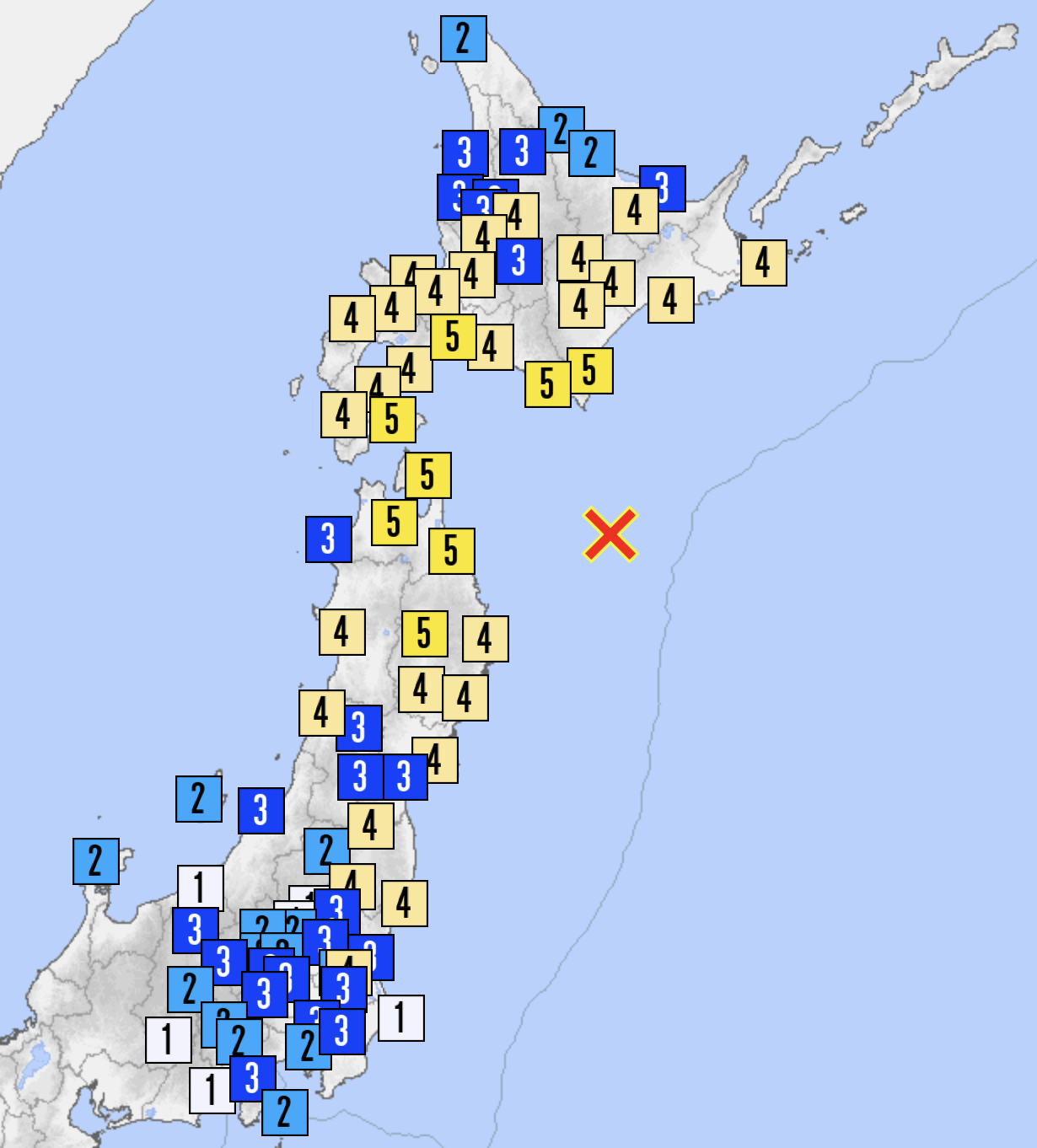

- Location within Japan
- UTC time: 1968-05-16 00:49:02
- ISC event: 821946
- USGS-ANSS: ComCat
- Local date: May 16, 1968
- Local time: 09:49:02
- Magnitude: 8.3 M_{w}
- Depth: 26 km (16 mi)
- Epicenter: 40.90°N 143.35°E
- Type: Oblique-slip
- Areas affected: Japan
- Max. intensity: MMI VI (Strong) JMA 5−
- Tsunami: 6 m (20 ft)
- Aftershocks: 7.9 M_{w}^{(ISC)} May 16 at 20:39
- Casualties: 47–52 killed 281–330 injured

The 1968 Tokachi earthquake (1968年十勝沖地震 Sen-kyūhyaku-rokujūhachi-nen Tokachi-oki Jishin) occurred on May 16 at 0:49 UTC (09:49 local time) in the area offshore of Aomori and Hokkaido. The magnitude of this earthquake was put at M_{w} 8.3. The intensity of the earthquake reached shindo 5 in Aomori, Aomori and Hakodate, Hokkaido.

== Geology ==
This earthquake was located near the junction of the Kuril Trench and the Japan Trench. It was an interplate earthquake. The focal mechanism of this earthquake showed movement on a thrust fault with a considerable slip-strike component. The sum of interplate seismic moment release by seismic and aseismic faulting in this earthquake was about 28×10^{20} N m. The 1960s was noted as one of the peak periods of interplate seismic moment release in the offshore Sanriku region.

== Damage ==
Heavy rain occurred due to a low pressure system in the days leading up to the earthquake and aggravated the damage. In Hokkaido, building damage was reported. A four-story RC building of Hakodate University collapsed. In Aomori Prefecture, there was damage to railroads and highways in more than 200 places caused by collapses of artificial embankments. In Hachinohe, there was damage to buildings, water pipes, and gas pipes. The three-story building of Hachinohe Technical College suffered severe damage. The communication between Honshu and Hokkaido was cut off.

== Tsunami ==
A tsunami was triggered by the earthquake, with a maximum height of about 6 m (20 ft). An 11-centimeter (4.3 in) high tsunami was recorded in Tahiti. In Japan, the tsunami caused flooding and damage to aquaculture.

== See also ==
- List of earthquakes in 1968
- List of earthquakes in Japan
