= Sendai Plain =

Alluvial plain in Miyagi, Japan

Coordinates: 38.25°N 141°E

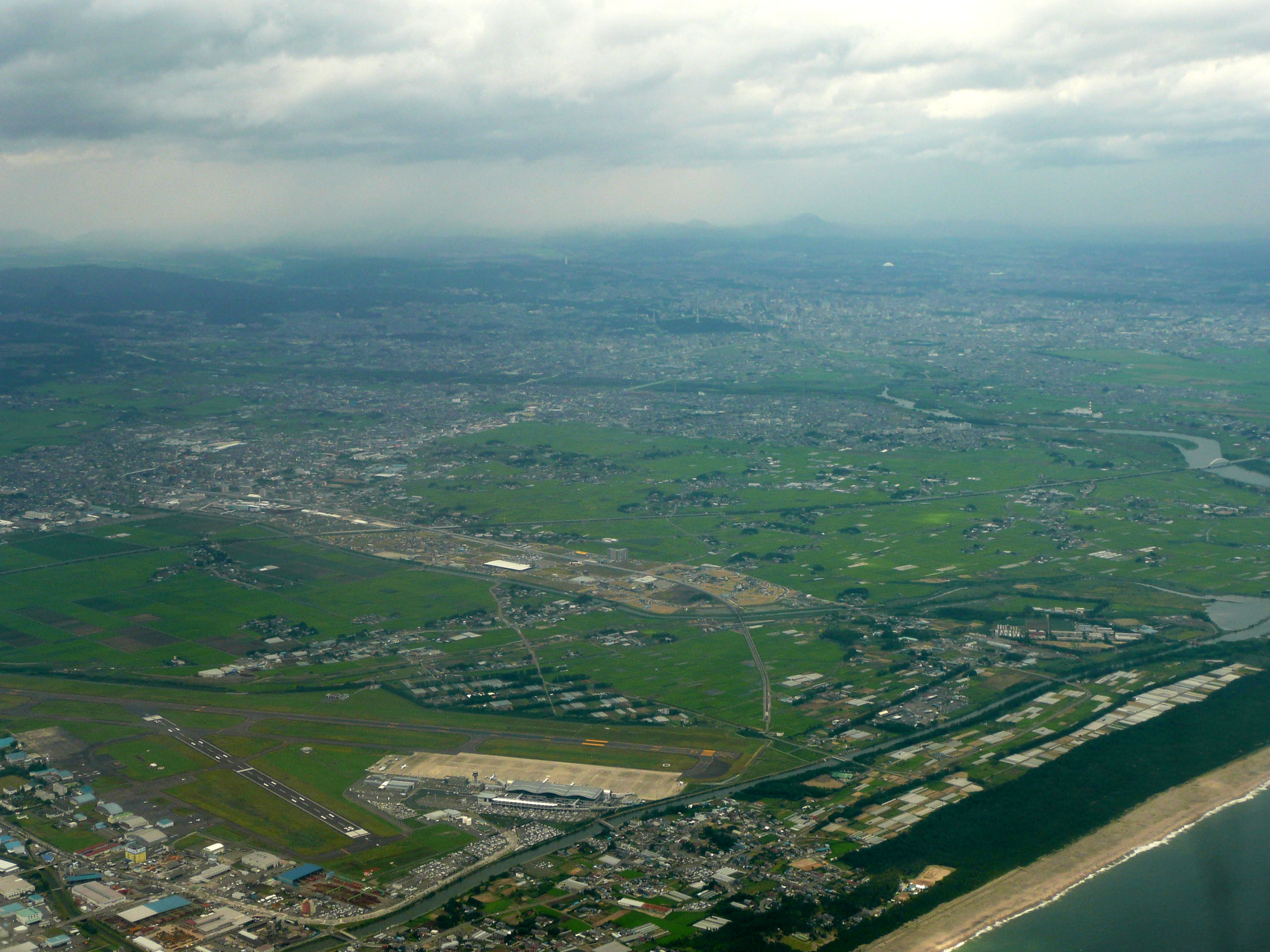
Sendai Plain

The Sendai Plain (Japanese: 仙台平野) is a plain that spreads over Miyagi Prefecture in Japan. The plain faces Sendai Bay.
