= 1896 Sanriku earthquake =

Tsunami earthquake in Honshu, Japan

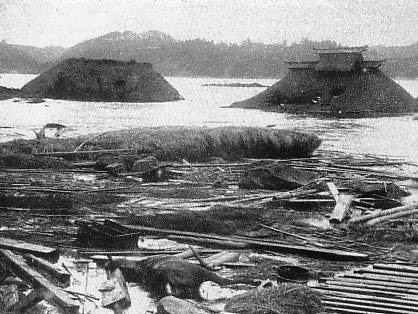
- Devastation caused by the tsunami at Sanriku.

- Location within Japan
- UTC time: 1896-06-15 10:32:30
- Local date: June 15, 1896
- Local time: 19:32:30 JST (UTC+09:00)
- Magnitude: 8.5 M_{w}, 7.2 M_{s}
- Depth: Shallow
- Epicenter: 39.5°N 144.0°E
- Type: Megathrust
- Areas affected: Empire of Japan; Republic of Hawaii
- Total damage: Tsunami
- Tsunami: Up to 38.2 m (125 ft) in Ryori, Kesen, Iwate, Tōhoku
- Casualties: At least 22,000 people died

An 8.5 magnitude earthquake occurred at 19:32 (local time) on June 15, 1896, on the Sanriku coast in Honshu, Japan. It resulted in two tsunami waves which destroyed about 9,000 homes and caused at least 22,000 deaths. It was one of the most destructive seismic events in Japanese history. The waves reached a then-record height of 38.2 metres (125 ft); this would remain the highest on record until waves from the 2011 Tōhoku earthquake exceeded that height by more than 2 metres (6 ft 7 in).

From the tsunami records the estimated tsunami's magnitude is (M_{t} = 8.2), much greater than expected for the seismic magnitude estimated from the observed seismic intensity (M_{s}=7.2). This earthquake is now regarded as being part of a distinct class of seismic events, the tsunami earthquake.

== Geology ==
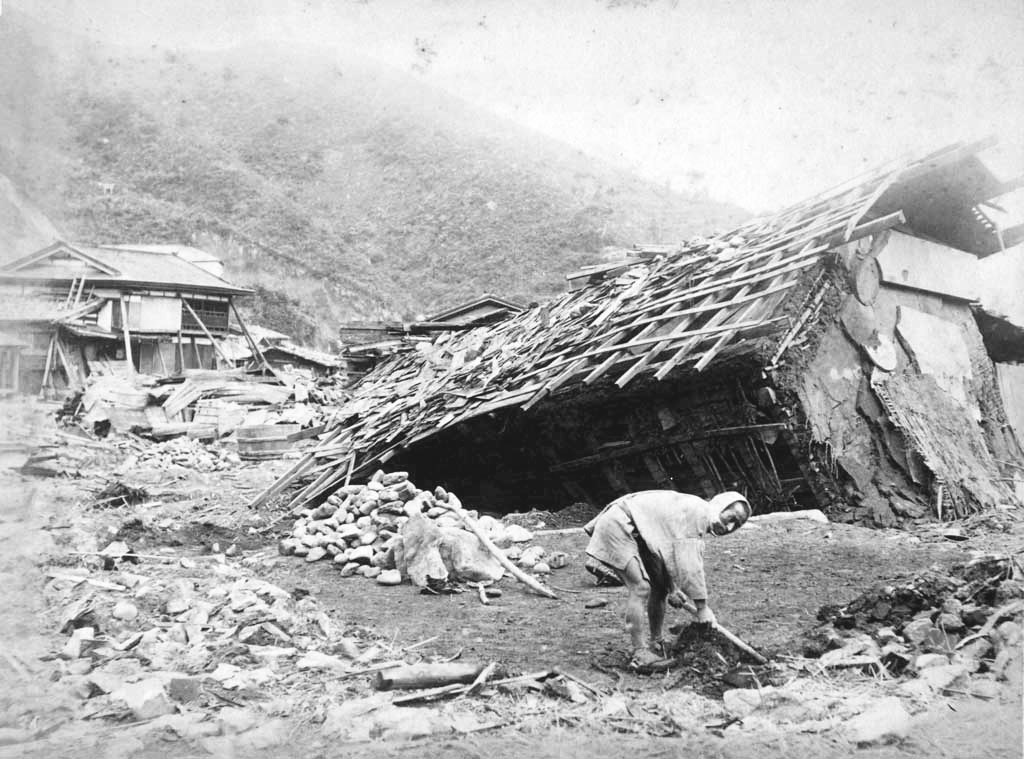
Houses heavily damaged by the tsunami

The epicenter lies just to the west of the Japan Trench, the surface expression of the west-dipping subduction zone. The trench forms part of the convergent boundary between the Pacific and Eurasian plates.

=== Magnitude ===
The unusual disparity between the magnitude of the earthquake and the subsequent tsunami may be due to a combination of factors:

1. the tsunami was caused by a slope failure triggered by the earthquake
2. the rupture velocity was unusually low

Scientists believe the effect of subducted sediment beneath the accretionary wedge was responsible for a slow rupture velocity. The effects of a 20° dipping fault along the top of the subducting plate was found to match both the observed seismic response and tsunami, but required a displacement of 10.4 m. The displacement was reduced to a more reasonable value after the extra uplift caused by the deformation of sediments in the wedge and a shallower fault dip of 10° was considered. This revised fault model gave a magnitude of M_{w}=8.0–8.1. A figure much closer to the estimated actual tsunami magnitude. A magnitude of 8.5 on the moment magnitude scale has also been estimated for this event.

== Tsunami ==
On the evening of June 15, 1896, communities along the Sanriku coast in northern Japan were celebrating a Shinto holiday and the return of soldiers from the First Sino-Japanese War. After a small earthquake, there was little concern because it was so weak and many small tremors had also been felt in the previous few months. However, 35 minutes later the first tsunami wave struck the coast, followed by a second a few minutes later. The damage was particularly severe because the tsunamis coincided with high tides. Most deaths occurred in Iwate and Miyagi although casualties were also recorded from Aomori and Hokkaido.

The power of the tsunami was great: large numbers of victims were found with broken bodies or missing limbs. As was their normal practise each evening, the local fishing fleets were all at sea when the tsunamis struck. In the deepwater, the waves went unnoticed. Only when they returned the next morning did they discover the debris and bodies.

Wave heights of up to 9 meters (30 ft) were also measured in Hawaii. They destroyed wharves and swept several houses away.

The word tsunami (from tsu "harbor" and nami "waves") was coined due to this disaster.

== Legacy ==
Many tsunami stones were installed following the disaster. Preventive coastal measures were not implemented until after another tsunami struck in 1933. Due to higher levels of tsunami awareness, fewer casualties were recorded following the 1933 Sanriku earthquake. Nevertheless, the earthquake of 11 March 2011 caused a huge tsunami that resulted in thousands of deaths across the same region and the nuclear disaster at Fukushima.

== See also ==
- 869 Jōgan earthquake
- 1933 Sanriku earthquake
- 2011 Tōhoku earthquake and tsunami
- List of earthquakes in Japan
- List of historical earthquakes
- Seismicity of the Sanriku coast
