= Sanriku =

Coastal region in northeastern Honshu, Japan

The Sanriku region of Japan

Sanriku (三陸), sometimes known as Rikushū (陸州), lies on the northeastern side of the island of Honshu, corresponding to today's Aomori, Iwate and parts of Miyagi Prefecture and has a long history.

The 36 bays of this irregular coastline tend to amplify the destructiveness of tsunami waves which reach the shores of Sanriku.

== History ==
On January 19, 1869, in the aftermath of the Boshin War, the provinces of Mutsu and Dewa were divided. Mutsu was split into new five provinces: Rikuō (also read Mutsu), Rikuchū, Rikuzen, Iwashiro and Iwaki. The first three of these collectively known as the "Three Riku", or Sanriku, with san (三) meaning "three."

The new provinces became quickly obsolete in July 1871 when the abolition of the han system divided Japan into its present prefectures that became the sole divisions used by the government. However, the label lives on in common usages such as the Sanriku Coast, which extends along Japan's Pacific coastline from Aomori in the north down to the Oshika Peninsula in Miyagi.

== See also ==
- Sanriku Expressway
- Sanriku Railway
- Seismicity of the Sanriku coast
  - Sanriku earthquake (disambiguation)
- Tōsandō
