= 1933 Sanriku earthquake =

Earthquake off the coast of Japan

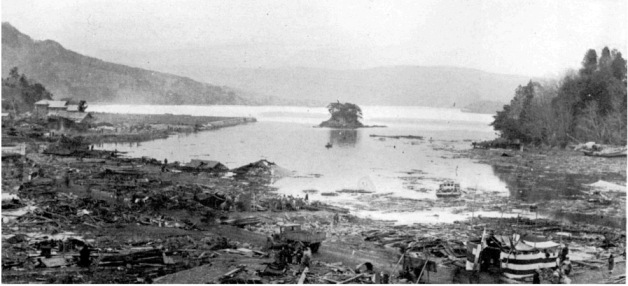
- Massakicho Town, Ōfunato Bay, Iwate after the event

- Location within Japan
- UTC time: 1933-03-02 17:30:59
- ISC event: 905420
- USGS-ANSS: ComCat
- Local date: March 3, 1933
- Local time: 02:30:48 JST
- Magnitude: 8.4 M_{w}
- Depth: 20 km (12 mi)
- Epicenter: 39°7.7′N 144°7′E
- Type: Dip-slip – Intraplate
- Areas affected: Japan
- Max. intensity: MMI V (Moderate) JMA 5
- Tsunami: Up to 28.7 m (94 ft) in Ryori, Kesen, Iwate, Tōhoku
- Casualties: 1,522 deaths, 1,542 missing, 12,053 people injured

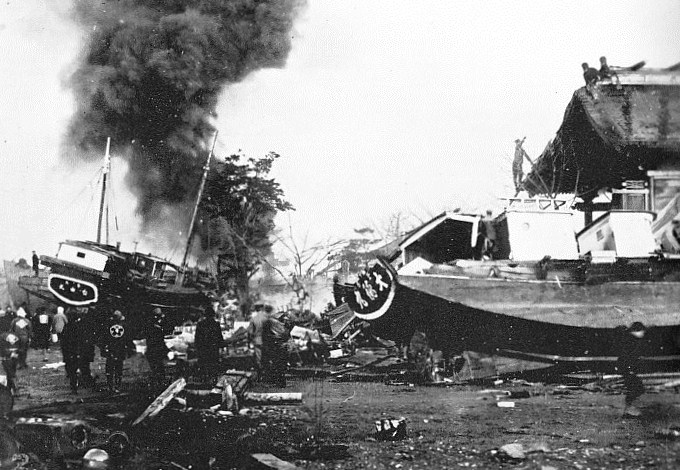
Damage at Kamaishi

The 1933 Sanriku earthquake (昭和三陸地震, Shōwa Sanriku Jishin) occurred on the Sanriku coast of the Tōhoku region of Honshū, Japan on March 2 with a moment magnitude of 8.4. The associated tsunami caused widespread devastation.

== Earthquake ==
The epicenter was located offshore, 290 kilometres (180 mi) east of the city of Kamaishi, Iwate. The main shock occurred at 02:31 AM local time on March 3, 1933 (17:31 UTC March 2, 1933), and measured 8.4 on the moment magnitude scale. It was in approximately the same location as the 1896 Sanriku earthquake and it occurred far enough away from the town that shaking did little damage. Approximately three hours after the main shock there was a magnitude 6.8 aftershock, followed by 76 more aftershocks (with a magnitude of 5.0 or greater) over a period of six months. This was an intraplate event that occurred within the Pacific plate, and the focal mechanism showed normal faulting.

== Damage ==
Although little damage was produced from the shock, the tsunami, which was recorded to reach the height of 28.7 metres (94 ft) at Ōfunato, Iwate, caused extensive damage, and destroyed many homes and caused numerous casualties. The tsunami destroyed over 7,000 homes along the northern Japanese coastline, of which over 4,885 were washed away. The tsunami was also recorded in Hawaii with a height of 9.5 feet (2.9 m), and also resulted in slight damage. The death toll came to 1,522 people confirmed dead, 1,542 missing, and 12,053 injured. Hardest hit was the town of Tarō, Iwate (now part of Miyako city), with 98% of its houses destroyed and 42% of its population killed.

== See also ==
- List of earthquakes in 1933
- List of earthquakes in Japan
- Seismicity of the Sanriku coast
