= 869 Jōgan earthquake =

Earthquake and tsunami near the Japanese island of Honshu

- Location within Japan
- Local date: 13 July 869
- Magnitude: 8.6–9.0 M_{w}
- Epicenter: 38.5°N 143.8°E
- Type: Megathrust
- Areas affected: Miyagi Prefecture, Japan
- Tsunami: Yes
- Casualties: ~1,000

The 869 Jōgan earthquake (貞観地震, Jōgan jishin) and its associated tsunami struck the area around Sendai in the northern part of Honshu on 9 July 869 (the 26th day of the 5th month in the 11th year of Jōgan; or 13 July 869). The earthquake had an estimated magnitude of at least 8.6 on the moment magnitude scale, but may have been as high as 9.0, similar to the 2011 Tōhoku earthquake and tsunami. The tsunami caused widespread flooding of the Sendai plain. In 2001, researchers identified sand deposits in a trench more than 4.5 kilometres (2.8 mi) from the coast as coming from this tsunami.

== Name ==
In Japan this earthquake is commonly called "Jōgan Jishin" (貞観地震). Jōgan is the Japanese era name for the period from 859 to 877 AD. But during the era other large earthquakes also occurred in Japan, so the name of the geographic epicenter and the anno domini year number when the quake occurred are sometimes added. Sanriku in this context is a name roughly corresponding to the Pacific front northeastern coastal area of Honshu island. The Japanese history text, Nihon Sandai Jitsuroku which was compiled in 901, recorded the 869 earthquake and tsunami of Mutsu Province.

== Description in public archives ==
Although this earthquake occurred in the frontier region of the ancient Japanese Empire based at Kyoto, a short and precise official record of this catastrophe was left. The description in Nihon Sandai Jitsuroku [True History of Three Reigns of Japan] (901) reads as follows:

五月廿六日癸未 陸奧國地大震動 流光如晝隱映 頃之 人民叫呼 伏不能起 或屋仆壓死 或地裂埋殪 馬牛駭奔 或相昇踏 城（郭）倉庫 門櫓墻壁 頽落顛覆 不知其數 海口哮吼 聲似雷霆 驚濤涌潮 泝洄漲長 忽至城下 去海數十百里 浩々不辨其涯諸 原野道路 惣爲滄溟 乘船不遑 登山難及 溺死者千許 資産苗稼 殆無孑遺焉

Translation:

On the 26th day of the 5th month (9 or 13 July 869 AD) a large earthquake occurred in Mutsu province with some strange light in the sky. People shouted and cried, lay down and could not stand up. Some were killed by the collapsed houses, others by the landslides. Horses and cattle got surprised, madly rushed around and injured the others. Enormous buildings, warehouses, gates and walls were destroyed. Then the sea began roaring like a big thunderstorm. The sea surface suddenly rose up and the huge waves attacked the land. They raged like nightmares, and immediately reached the city center. The waves spread thousands of yards from the beach, and we could not see how large the devastated area was. The fields and roads completely sank into the sea. About one thousand people drowned in the waves, because they failed to escape either offshore or uphill from the waves. The properties and crop seedlings were almost completely washed away.

== Tectonic setting ==
The northern part of Honshu lies above the convergent boundary between the over-riding Okhotsk microplate (a proposed microplate within the North American plate) and the subducting Pacific plate. This boundary has been associated with a series of large historical earthquakes, originating either from rupture along the plate interface or from deformation within either the over-riding or subducting plates, many of them triggering a destructive tsunami, such as the 1896 Sanriku earthquake.

== Damage ==
In the area which the earthquake struck, the Imperial Court of Japan battled with an indigenous people of the Tōhoku region, Emishi, at that time. According to Nihon Sandai Jitsuroku, around 1,000 people were killed by the tsunami. There are legends about the earthquake from Tōhoku region to Bōsō Peninsula. The tsunami caused extensive flooding of the Sendai plain, determined to have reached at least 4 km (2.5 mi) inland, destroying the town of Tagajō and its castle. Archaeological investigations have identified the remains of 8th and 9th century buildings beneath the town, covered by sediments dated to the middle of the 10th century.

== Characteristics ==
=== Earthquake ===
The estimated magnitude of the earthquake as 8.6 on the surface wave magnitude scale, has been taken from modelling of the tsunami. A source area of 200 kilometres (120 mi) long by 85 kilometres (53 mi) wide with a displacement of 2 metres (6 ft 7 in) is consistent with the observed distribution and degree of flooding. Analysis of the tsunami deposits associated with the 2011 earthquake suggests that the extent of sand deposition in the earlier events underestimated the degree of inundation. A muddy deposit was found to extend half as far again as the sand sheet. As the topography and cultivation of the Sendai plain has not changed significantly since 869, it has been proposed that the sources of the 2011 and 869 tsunamis were of comparable size, suggesting that the magnitude of the 869 earthquake has been severely underestimated. Thus the magnitude of this quake may have been as high as 9.0.

=== Tsunami ===
The extent of flooding caused by the tsunami of the Sendai plain has been mapped using dated deposits of sand. The tsunami flooded at least 4 kilometres (2.5 mi) inland. The inundated areas closely matched those of the 2011 Tōhoku tsunami.

== Predicted earthquake hazard ==
Three tsunami deposits have been identified within the Holocene sequence of the Sendai plain, all formed within the last 3,000 years, suggesting an 800 to 1,100-year recurrence interval for large tsunamigenic earthquakes. In 2001 it was reckoned that there was a high likelihood of a large tsunami hitting the Sendai plain, as more than 1,100 years had then elapsed.

As for the other two large tsunamis recognized before the 869 tsunami, one was estimated to have occurred between about 1000 BC and 500 BC and the other around 1 AD. In 2007, the probability of an earthquake with a magnitude of M_{w} 8.1–8.3 was estimated as 99% within the following 30 years. The 2011 Tōhoku earthquake occurred in exactly the same area as the 869 earthquake, fulfilling the earlier prediction and causing major flooding in the Sendai area.

== See also ==
- List of earthquakes in Japan
- List of historical earthquakes
- Seismicity of the Sanriku coast
- 1454 Kyōtoku earthquake and tsunami
