= Rising Sun Flag =

Historical Japanese military flag

Naval ensign of Japan

The Rising Sun Flag (Japanese: 旭日旗, Hepburn: Kyokujitsu-ki) is a Japanese flag that consists of a red disc and sixteen red rays emanating from the disc. Like the Japanese national flag, the Rising Sun Flag symbolizes the Sun.

The flag was originally used by feudal warlords in Japan during the Edo period (1603–1868 AD). On May 15, 1870, as a policy of the Meiji government, it was adopted as the war flag of the Imperial Japanese Army; further, on October 7, 1889, it was adopted as the naval ensign of the Imperial Japanese Navy.

At present, the flag is flown by the Japan Maritime Self-Defense Force, and an eight-ray version is flown by the Japan Self-Defense Forces and the Japan Ground Self-Defense Force. The rising sun design is also seen in numerous scenes in daily life in Japan, such as in fishermen's banners hoisted to signify large catches of fish, flags to celebrate childbirth, and in flags for seasonal festivities.

The flag is controversial in some Asian countries, mainly in Korea and China, as well as among Allied World War II veterans (mainly in Australia), where it is associated with Japanese war crimes, the Axis powers, and Japanese militarism and imperialism.

== History and design ==
The emblem (mon) of the Kikuchi clan, eight sun-rays (八つ日足紋)

The emblem (mon) of the Ryūzōji clan and Kusano clan, twelve sun-ray variation (変わり十二日足)

The flag of Japan and the symbolism of the rising Sun has held symbolic meaning in Japan since the Asuka period (538–710 CE). The Japanese archipelago is east of the Asian mainland, and is thus where the Sun "rises". In 607 CE, an official correspondence that began with "from the Emperor of the rising sun" was sent to Chinese Emperor Yang of Sui. Japan is often referred to as "the land of the rising sun". In the 12th century work The Tale of the Heike, it was written that different samurai carried drawings of the Sun on their fans.

The Japanese word for Japan is 日本, which is pronounced 'Nihon' or 'Nippon', and literally means "the origin of the Sun". The character nichi (日) means "sun" or "day"; hon (本) means "base" or "origin". The compound therefore means "origin of the sun" and is the source of the popular Western epithet "Land of the Rising Sun". The red disc symbolizes the Sun and the red lines are light rays shining from the rising sun.

The design of the Rising Sun Flag (Asahi) has been widely used since ancient times, and a part of it was called "Hiashi" (日足/ひあし) and used as the samurai's crest ("Hiashimon" (日足紋)). The flag was especially used by samurai in the Kyushu region. Examples include the "twelve sun-rays" (変わり十二日足) of the Ryūzōji clan (1186–1607 CE) in Hizen Province and the Kusano clan (草野氏) in Chikugo Province, and the "eight sun-rays" (八つ日足紋) of the Kikuchi clan (1070–1554 CE) in Higo Province. There is a theory that in many parts of the Kyushu region, Hizen and Higo are related to what was called "the country of Japan (Hi)". (Note: In modern times, it is also used as a simple pattern, for example, Yurikamome Inc. (company), Hinode Station pattern.)

War flag of the Imperial Japanese Army (1870–1945)

There have been many types of Asahi flags since ancient times, and the design in which light rays spread in all directions without clouds expresses honored day or auspicious events, and was a design that was used for celebrate a good catch, childbirth and seasonal festivities. A well-known variant of the flag of the sun disc design is the sun disc with 16 red rays in a Siemens star formation. The Rising Sun Flag (旭日 旗, Kyokujitsu-ki) has been used as a traditional national symbol of Japan since at least the Edo period (1603 CE). It is featured in artwork such as ukiyo-e prints, one example being the Lucky Gods' visit to Enoshima ukiyo-e print by Utagawa Yoshiiku in 1869 and the One Hundred Views of Osaka, Three Great Bridges print by Utagawa Kunikazu in 1854. The Fujiyama Tea Co. used it as a wooden box label of Japanese green tea for export in the Meiji period (1880s).

Naval ensign, flown by ships of the Imperial Japanese Navy (1889–1945). Flag ratio: 2:3.

The Rising Sun Flag was historically used by the daimyō (大名) and Japan's military, particularly the Imperial Japanese Army and the Imperial Japanese Navy. The ensign, known in Japanese as the Jyūrokujō-Kyokujitsu-ki (十六条旭日旗), was first adopted as the war flag on May 15, 1870, and was used until the end of World War II in 1945. It was re-adopted on June 30, 1954, and is now used by the Japan Maritime Self-Defense Force (JMSDF). The Japan Self-Defense Forces (JSDF) and Japan Ground Self-Defense Force (JGSDF) use a variation of the Rising Sun Flag with red, white and gold colors.

The design is similar to the flag of Japan, which has a red circle in the center signifying the Sun. The difference compared to the flag of Japan is that the Rising Sun Flag has extra sun rays (16 for the ensign) exemplifying the name of Japan as "The Land of the Rising Sun". The Imperial Japanese Army first adopted the Rising Sun Flag in 1870. The Imperial Japanese Army and the Imperial Japanese Navy both had a version of the flag; the naval ensign was off-set, with the red sun closer to the lanyard side, while the army's version (which was part of the regimental colors) was centered. The flags were used until Japan's surrender in World War II during August 1945. After the establishment of the Japan Self-Defense Forces in 1954, the off-set Rising Sun Flag was re-adopted for the JMSDF and a new 8-rays Rising Sun Flag with a yellow border for the JGSDF and JSDF was approved by the Supreme Commander for the Allied Powers (SCAP/GHQ). The flag with the off-set sun and 16 rays is the ensign of the Maritime Self-Defense Force, but it was modified with a different color red. The old flag is darker red (RGB #b12d3d) and the post-WW2 modified version is brighter red (RGB #bd0029).

The Imperial Japanese Army flag with symmetrical 16 rays and a 2:3 ratio was abolished. The Japan Self-Defense Forces and the Ground Self-Defense Force use a significantly different Rising Sun Flag with 8-rays and an 8:9 ratio. The edges of the rays are asymmetrical since they form angles 19, 21, 26 and 24 degrees. It also has indentations for the yellow (golden) irregular triangles along borders. The JSDF Rising Sun Flag was adopted by a law/order/decree published in the Official Gazette of June 30, 1954.

Regardless of the military flag, before the Meiji period, the design of Asahi was used for prayers, festivals, celebration events, reconstruction, logos of companies and products, big catch flags (Tairyō-bata), corporate and product logos and sports.

=== Present-day use ===
The Japanese naval ensign, which is flown by ships of the Japan Maritime Self-Defense Force (established in 1954). It uses a 2:3 ratio.

The flag of the Japan Self-Defense Forces and the Japan Ground Self-Defense Force (established in 1954)

Commercially the Rising Sun Flag is used on many products, designs, clothing, posters, beer cans (Asahi Breweries), newspapers (Asahi Shimbun), bands, manga, comics, anime, movies, video games (such as E. Honda's stage of Street Fighter II, although this was removed in the 2021 re-release), World War II video games, as well as appearing elsewhere. The Rising Sun Flag appears on commercial product labels, such as on the cans of one variety of Asahi Breweries lager beer. Among fishermen, the tairyō-ki (大漁旗, "Good Catch Flag") represents their hope for a good catch of fish. Today it is used as a decorative flag on vessels as well as for festivals and events. The Rising Sun Flag is also used at sporting events by the supporters of Japanese teams and individual athletes.

Since June 30, 1954, the Rising Sun Flag has been the war flag and naval ensign of the Japan Maritime Self-Defense Force (JMSDF). JSDF Chief of Staff Katsutoshi Kawano said the Rising Sun Flag is the Maritime Self-Defense Force sailors' "pride". The Japan Self-Defense Forces (JSDF) and the Japan Ground Self-Defense Force (JGSDF) use the Rising Sun Flag with eight red rays extending outward, called Hachijō-Kyokujitsuki (八条旭日旗). A gold border partially lines the edge.

The flag is also used by non-Japanese, for example, in the emblems of some U.S. military units based in Japan, and by the American blues rock band Hot Tuna, on the cover of its album Live in Japan. It is used as an emblem of the United States Fleet Activities Sasebo, as a patch of the Strike Fighter Squadron 94, a mural at Misawa Air Base, the former insignia of Strike Fighter Squadron 192 and Joint Helmet Mounted Cueing System with patches of the 14th Fighter Squadron. Some extreme right-wing groups display it at political protests.

== Controversy ==
While Japan considers the rising sun flag part of its history, Asian countries annexed or occupied by Japan (especially the Philippines, Korea, China, Malaysia, and Singapore), and Russia say the flag is associated with Imperial Japan's wartime atrocities, the Axis powers, and is comparable to the flag of Imperial Japan's WWII ally, the Nazi swastika. The Imperial Japanese Navy used the flag in the early 20th century as Japan colonized the Korean Peninsula, and invaded and occupied parts of China and other Asian countries until its defeat in World War II in 1945.

South Korea’s campaign against the Rising Sun Flag began in earnest in 2011. In an association football match against Japan, South Korean footballer Ki Sung-yueng was accused of making a racist gesture, sparking outrage in Japan. Ki responded that he had intended to highlight the racism he had experienced at Celtic F.C. and that his "heart shed tears" after he saw the Rising Sun Flag at the match. On the other hand, many in Japan insist that the Rising Sun Flag was not in the stadium. For this reason, there is a widespread view in Japan that Ki Sung-yueng used the excuse of having seen the Rising Sun Flag to justify his racist gesture.

The flag is banned by FIFA, and Japan was sanctioned by the Asian Football Confederation (AFC) after Japanese fans flew it at an AFC Champions League game in 2017.

In 2012, South Koreans who disapproved of the flag began to refer to it as a "war crime flag". According to political scientist Kan Kimura, in 2012, following Ki Sung-yueng's remarks, Koreans living in New York formed a political group "The Citizens Against War Criminal Symbolism" and started a campaign to equate the Rising Sun Flag with the Nazi swastika and ban it. The following year at the 2013 EAFF East Asian Cup, a banner with a slogan about historical issues with Japan appeared on the Korean cheering squad. As these events were often reported in the Korean media, an international political movement among Koreans to equate the Rising Sun Flag with that of the Nazi swastika and to prohibit it intensified.

According to Koichi Nakano, professor of political science at Sophia University, "no-one in Japan uses the rising sun flag for any purpose other than romanticizing and rewriting the horrible human rights abuses committed under the Japanese Empire." He suggests that the American Confederate battle flag, where it was used in the American Civil War by southern states that wanted to keep slavery, would be a better comparison than the flag of Nazi Germany. The Confederate battle flag is not banned but is a symbol of racial segregation and perceived superiority, according to critics.

South Korea did not object to Japan's adoption of the Rising Sun Flag for the Japan Maritime Self-Defense Force in 1952, nor to the entry into South Korean ports Japanese warships flying the flag on a warship at the 1998 and 2008 navy fleet reviews held in South Korea. However, when hosting an international fleet review at Jeju Island from October 10 to 14, 2018, South Korea requested all participating countries to display only their national flags and the South Korean flag on their vessels, a request apparently aimed at preventing Japan from flying the Rising Sun Flag, which had been the ensign of the Japanese Maritime Self-Defense Force since it was established in 1954. Japan announced on October 5, 2018, that it would be withdrawing from the fleet review because it could not accept Seoul's request to remove the Rising Sun Flag. Japanese officials say the flag is mandatory for Japan's naval ships under domestic laws and is widely recognized as identification for the Japanese military under an international maritime convention. On October 6, 2018, JSDF Chief of Staff Katsutoshi Kawano said the Rising Sun Flag was the "pride" of Maritime Self-Defense Force sailors, and that the JMSDF would absolutely not go if they had to remove the flag.

The South Korean parliamentary committee for sports asked the organizers of the 2020 Summer Olympics in Tokyo to ban the Rising Sun Flag, with South Korean lawmaker An Min-suk stating that the Olympics could not proceed peacefully with the flag in the stadium. In September 2019, the Chinese Civil Association for Claiming Compensation from Japan sent a letter to the International Olympic Committee (IOC) to ban the flag. According to the Associated Press, the IOC confirmed the receipt of the letter and said in a statement "sports stadiums should be free of any political demonstration. When concerns arise at games time we look at them on a case by case basis." In 2021, South Korea's Olympic committee said that in exchange for taking down banners at the Olympic village that referred to the Imjin War, which was ruled by the IOC as provocative, the IOC promised that the rising sun flag will be banned at stadiums and other Olympic venues. At the end of the Tokyo 2020 Olympics, a delegate from South Korea said that there were no diplomatic incidents between South Korea and Japan during the Olympics, adding that "it was an 'achievement of sports diplomacy' for South Korea that IOC had decided to ban Japan's Rising Sun flag." In response, the Tokyo Organising Committee of the Olympic Games announced on 9 August, "The announcement by the South Korean Olympic Committee is not true. When we contacted the IOC, we confirmed that the IOC will continue to respond to the issue on a case-by-case basis and will not impose a blanket ban. On the morning of 9 August, the IOC had sent a letter to South Korea indicating that the use of the flag will be determined on a case-by-case basis."

Alexis Dudden, a professor of history at the University of Connecticut, argued that the rising sun flag should be banned at the 2020 Summer Olympics because the flag "is part of a collective effort to cleanse the history of Imperial Japan’s aggression during the second world war," therefore causing intentional harm to those who suffered under Japanese rule. She added that it was unsurprising that the South Korean government was the first to raise objections to the flag being waved at the 2020 Olympics, since Korea was occupied by Japan from 1910 until 1945.

In 2021, Capcom removed the appearances of the Rising Sun Flag from their re-release of Street Fighter II. Capcom did not provide an official reason for the flag's removal; however, it is guessed that the flag was removed in an effort not to offend any parts of the international gaming community.

The Japanese government's basic position on the Rising Sun Flag is that "claims that the flag is an expression of political assertions or a symbol of militarism are absolutely false." The Sankei Shimbun, a right-wing Japanese newspaper, criticized South Korea's attitude toward the Rising Sun Flag, stating that even the United States, who had opposed Japan during World War II, had not protested formally against the Rising Sun Flag. The same newspaper argued that the history of the flag dates back much further than World War II, and that the corporate logo of the Asahi Shimbun, which is praised for being conscientious in South Korea, also uses the rising sun design.

The Japanese Vexillological Association states that the flag was designed for the Imperial Japanese Army in the early Meiji period, with a different version adopted by naval forces, stating that "Flags used by the military are domestic decisions", arguing that "the Rising Sun flag existed before Japan went to war and the nature of the issue is different from that of the swastika flag, which was created to symbolize the Nazi regime's political ideologies." Former Prime Minister Shigeru Yoshida has stated that "There is no country in the world that does not know this flag. The flag can be recognized as Japan's in any sea", with the flag having been adopted for its "recognizability" as the naval flag of the JMSDF.

== Examples ==
=== Art ===
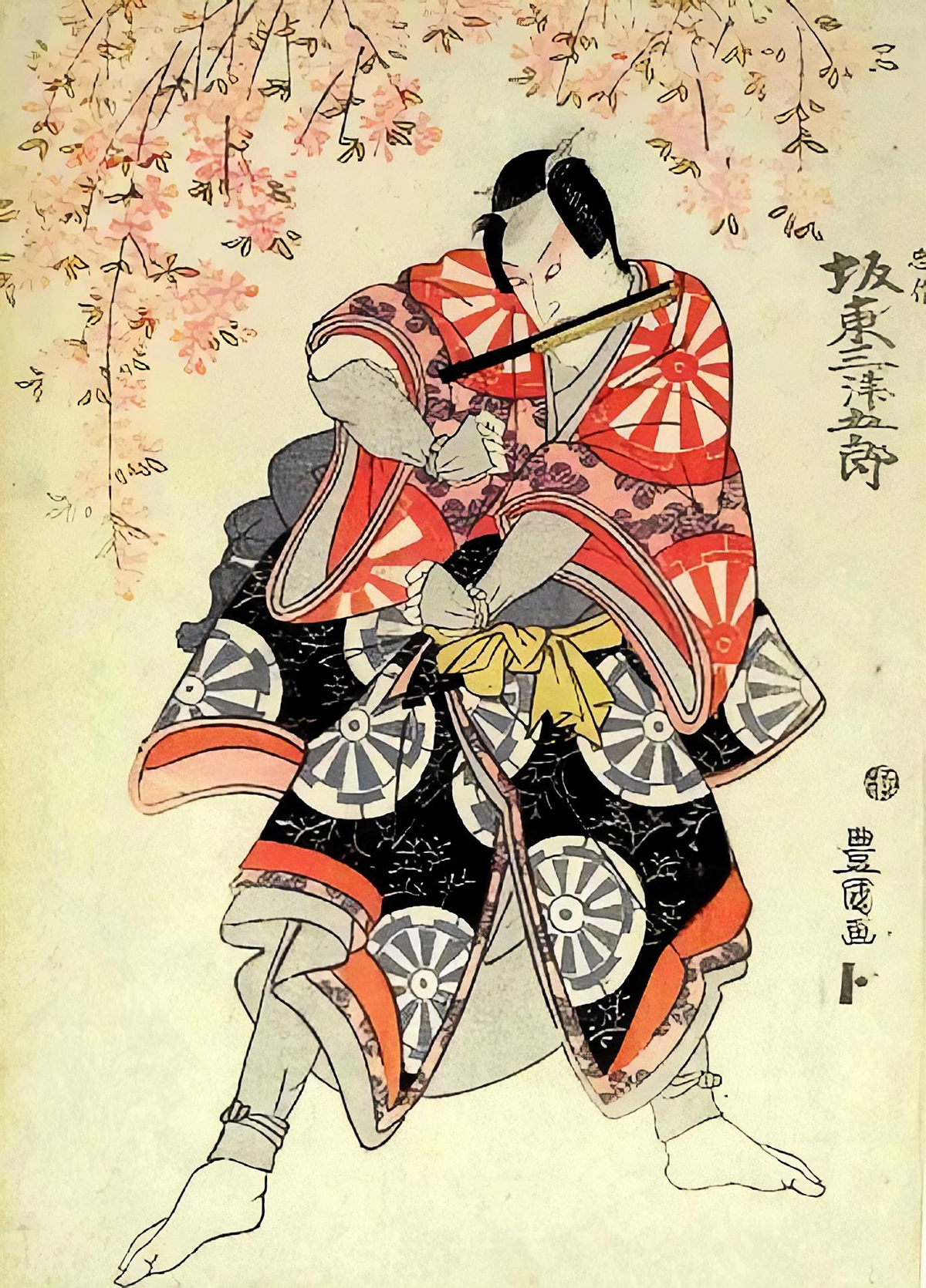
Kabuki actor Bandō Mitsugorō III (c. 1822)

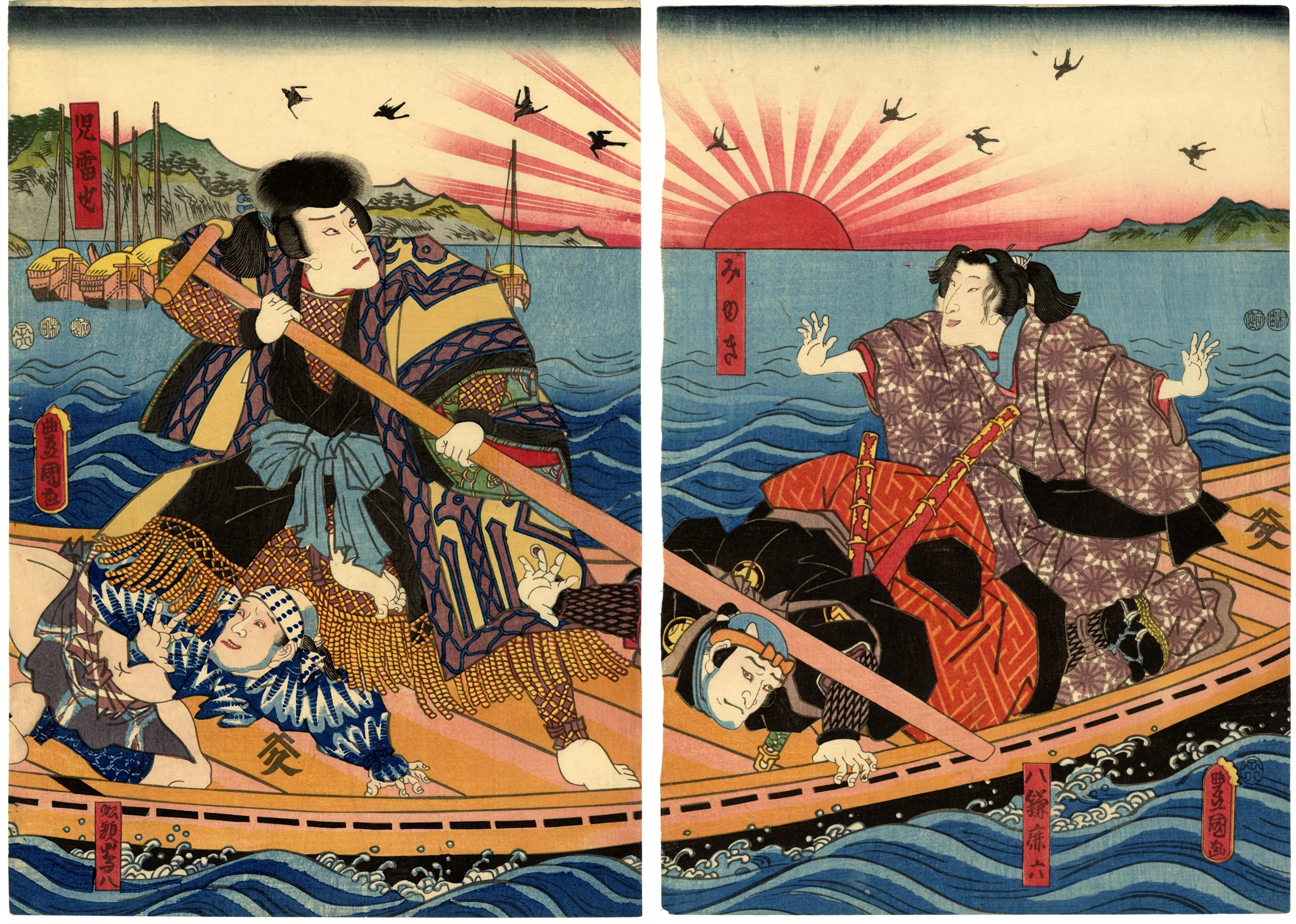
Jiraiya, Sunrise and Boat, ukiyo-e by Utagawa Kunisada (1852)

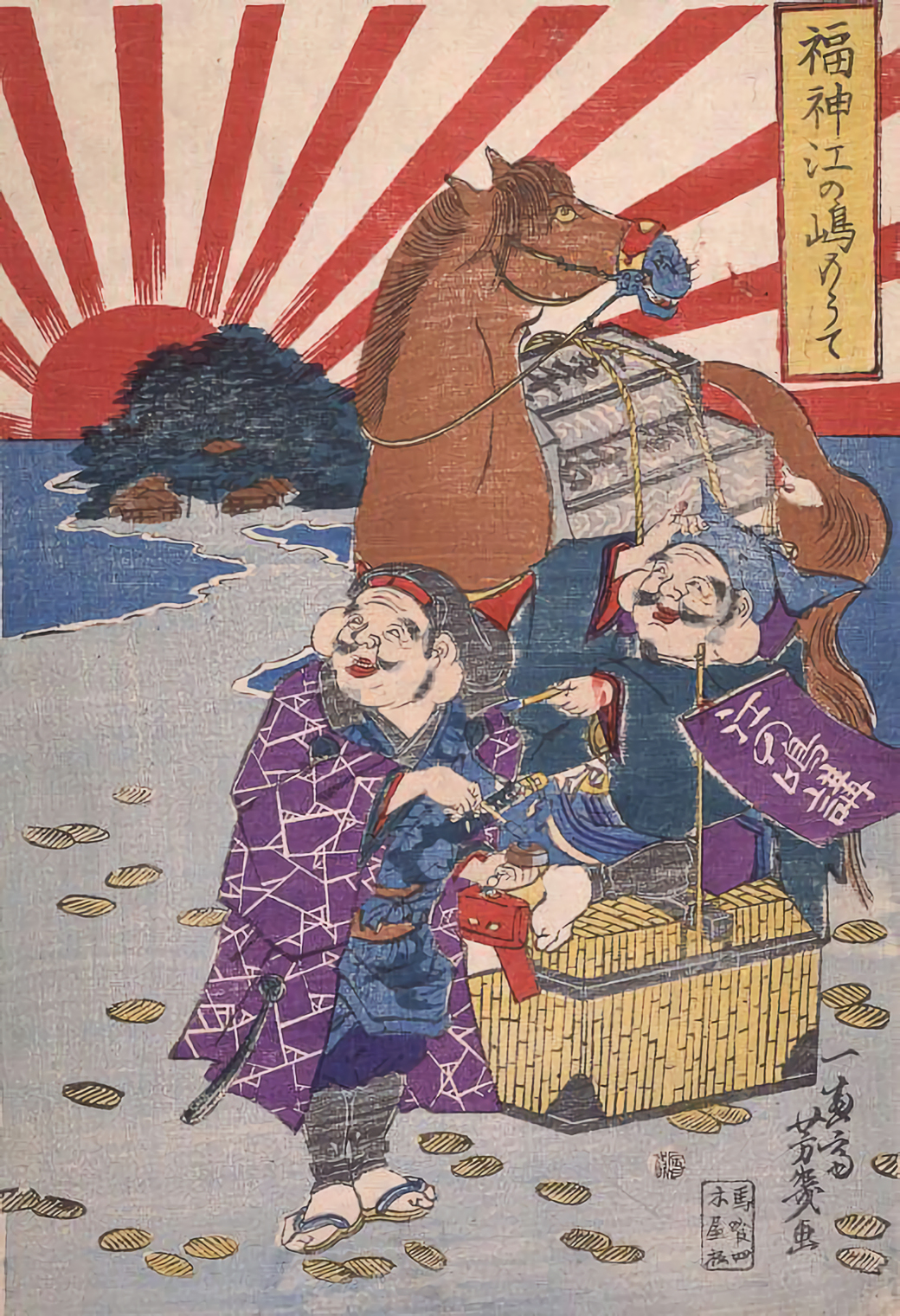
Lucky Gods' visit to Enoshima, ukiyo-e print by Utagawa Yoshiiku (1869)

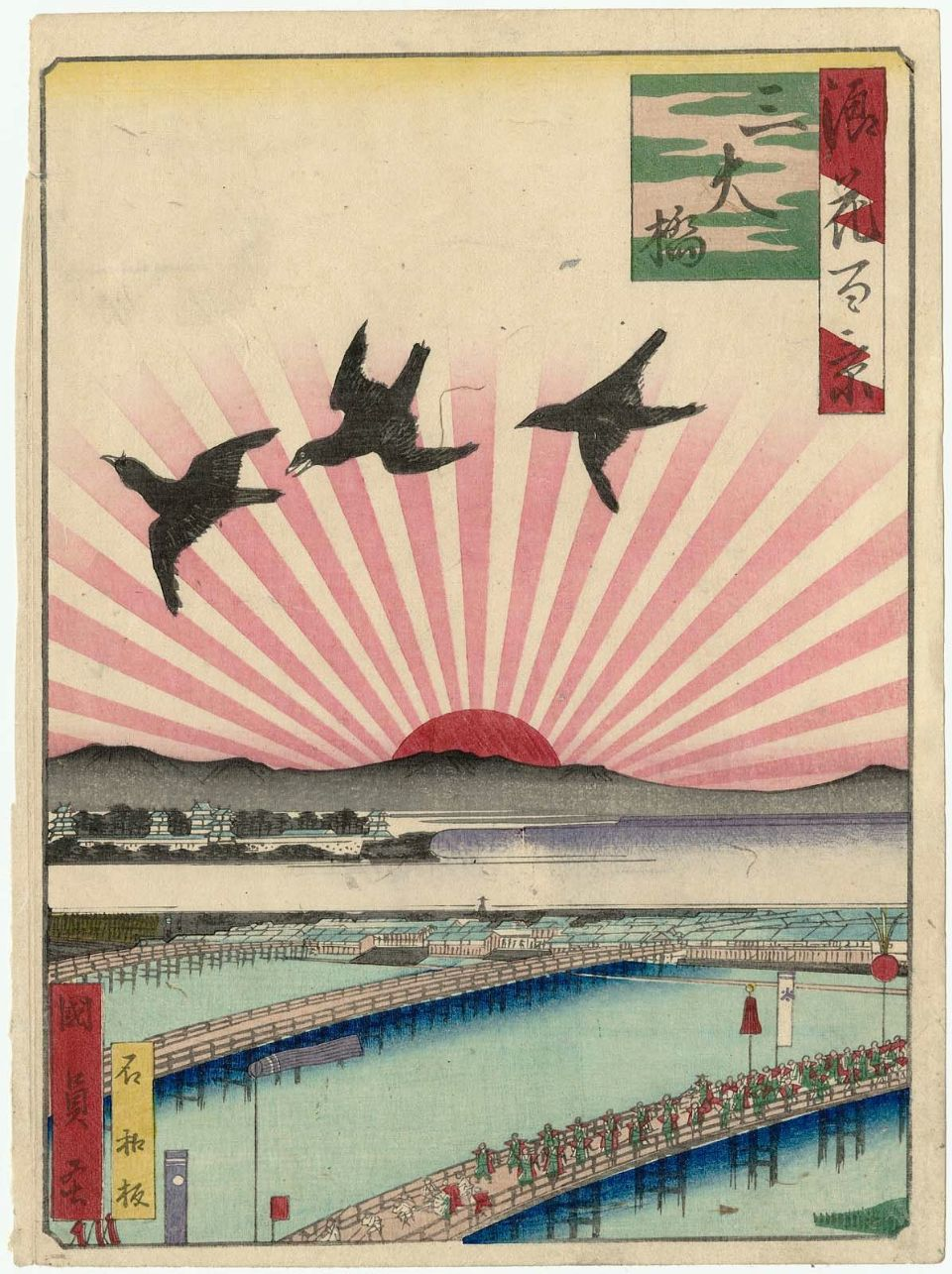
One Hundred Views of Osaka, Three Great Bridges, ukiyo-e print by Utagawa Kunikazu, 1854. The composition shows the morning sun rising behind the Nanhwa Three Bridge.

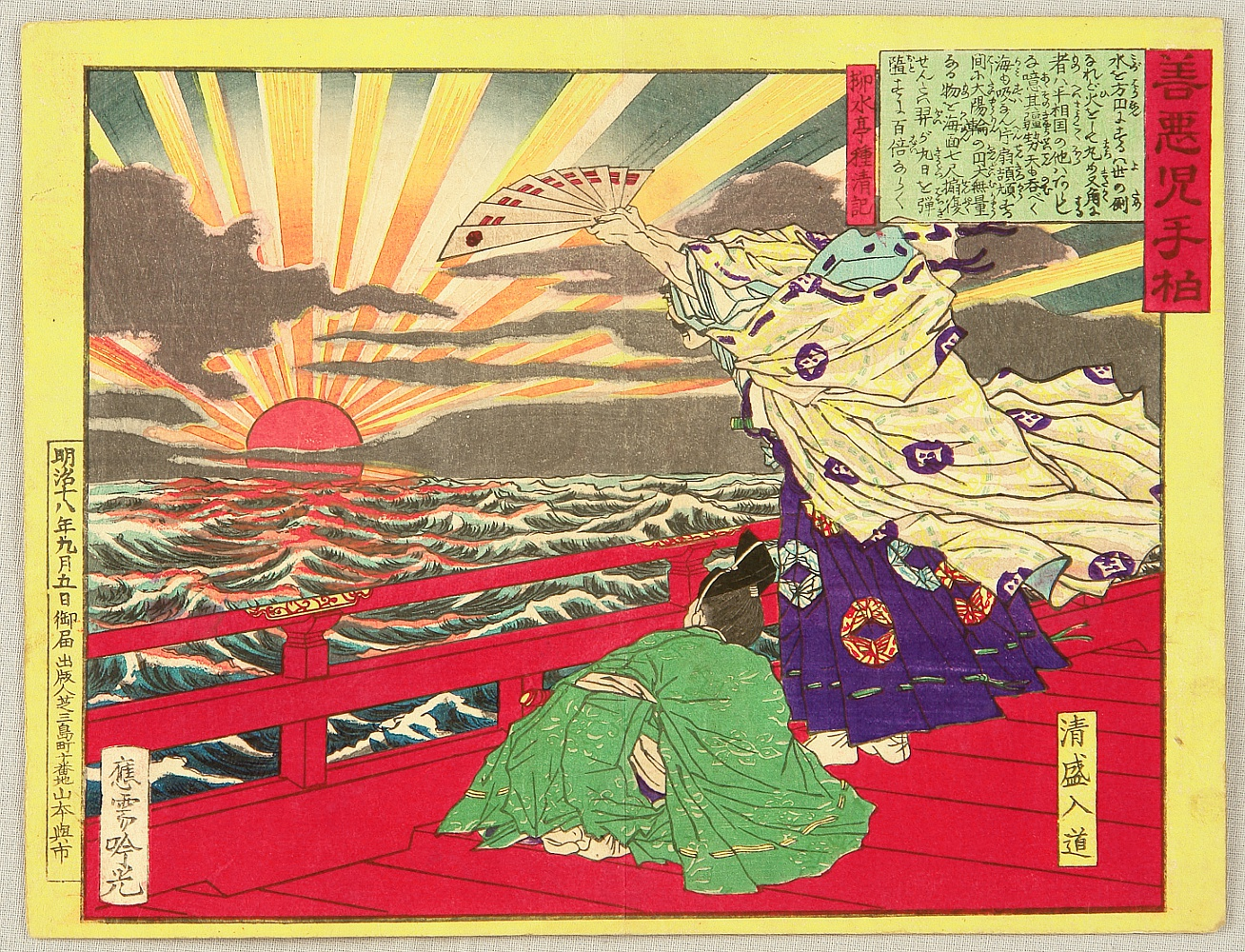
From "Good and evil child's hand", "Kiyomori entrance" (Adachi Ginbo, 1885)

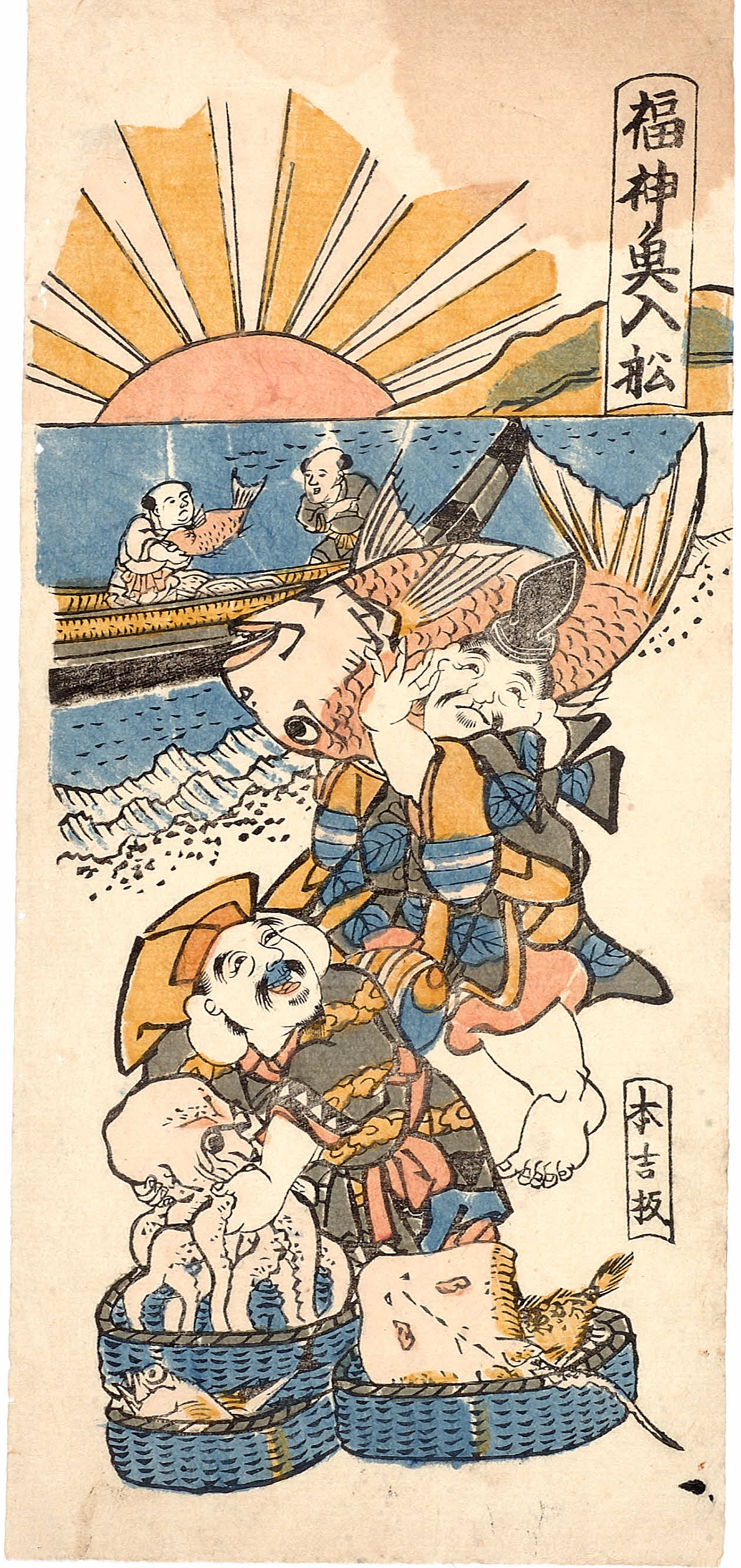
Fukujin Sakana Irifune (author unknown, 19th century Edo period)

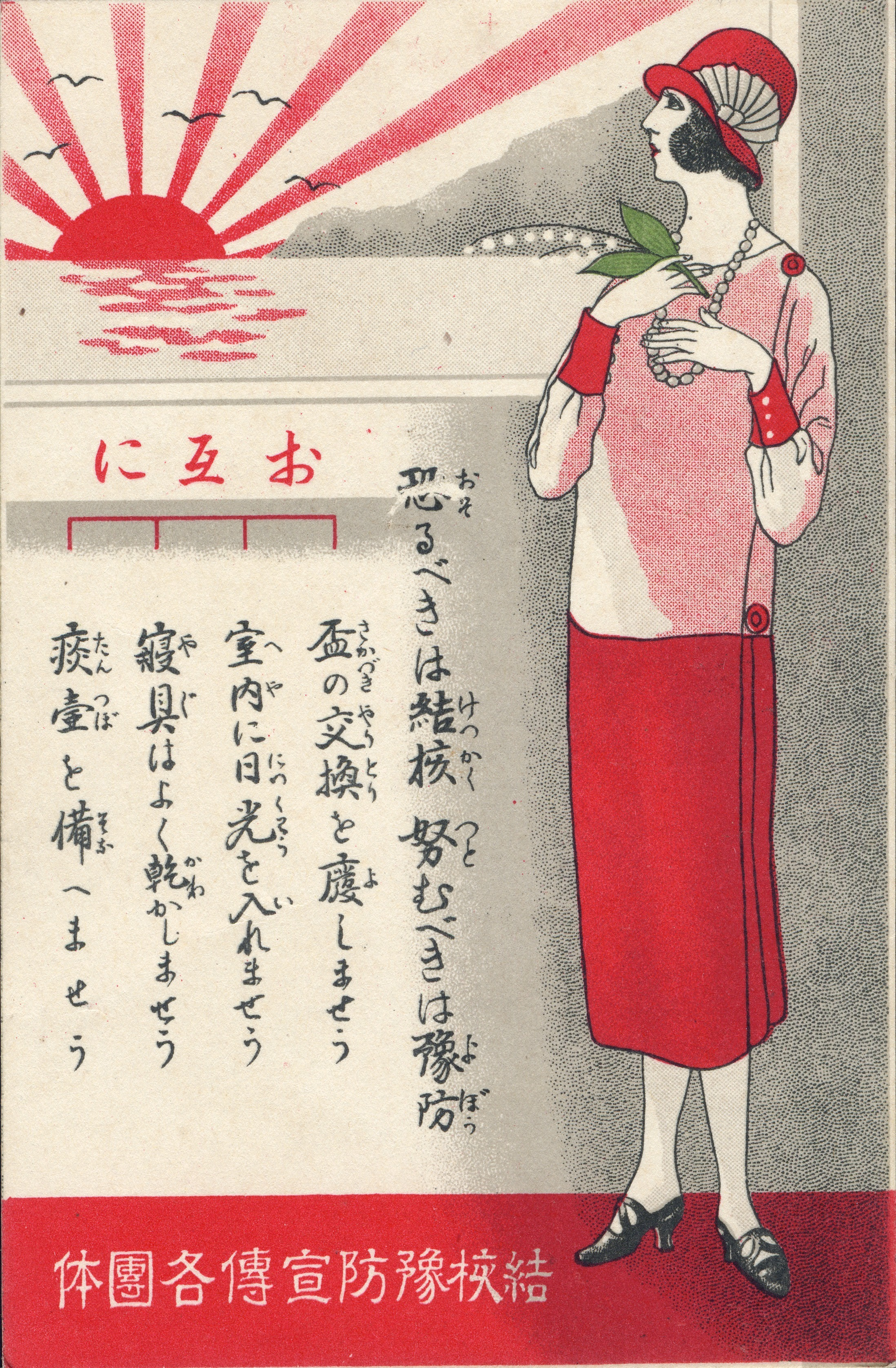
The postcard of anti-tuberculosis groups in Japan (June 27, 1925)

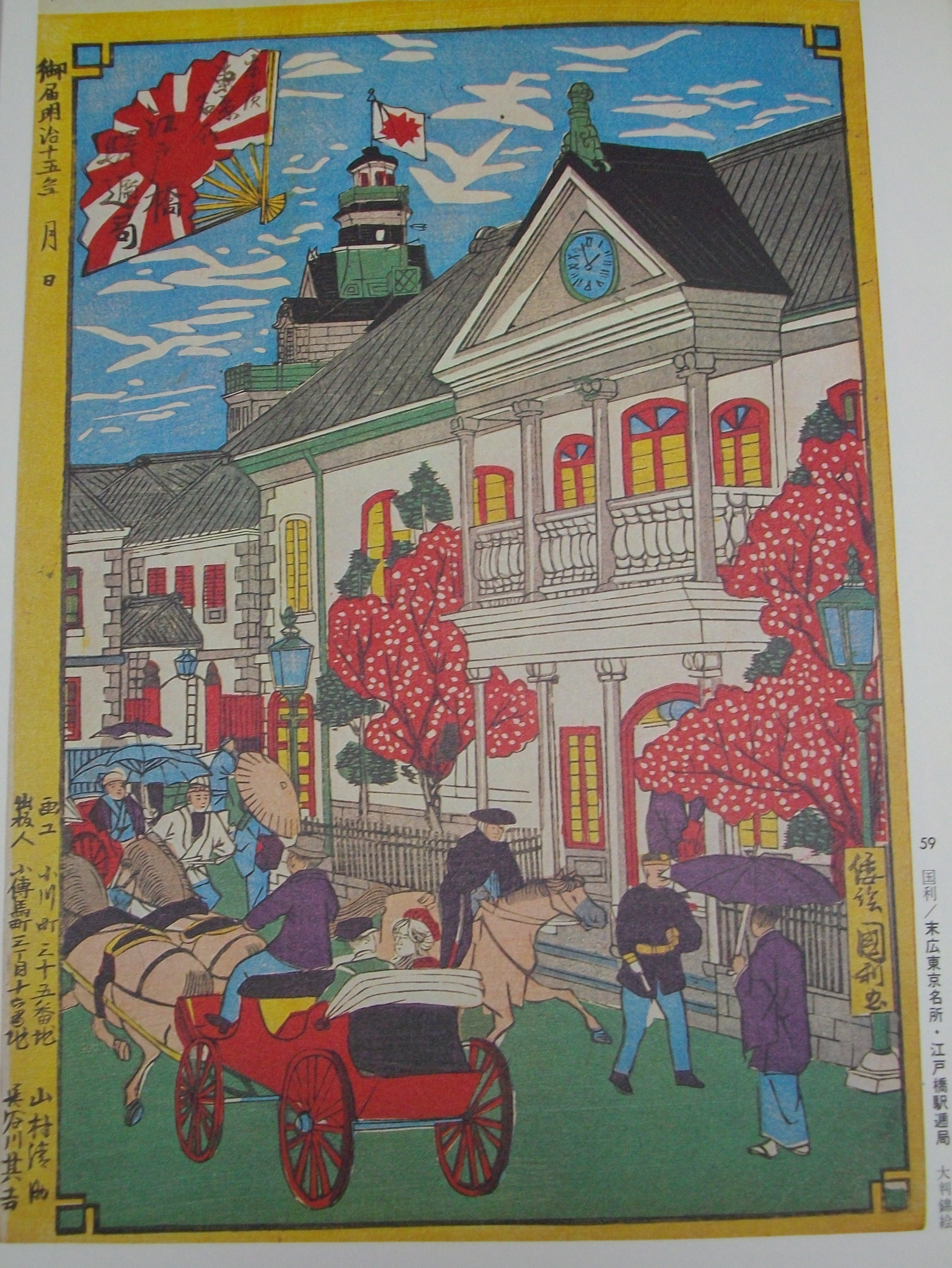
Suehiro Tokyo sights – the Edobashi office of Communications and Transportation (1882)

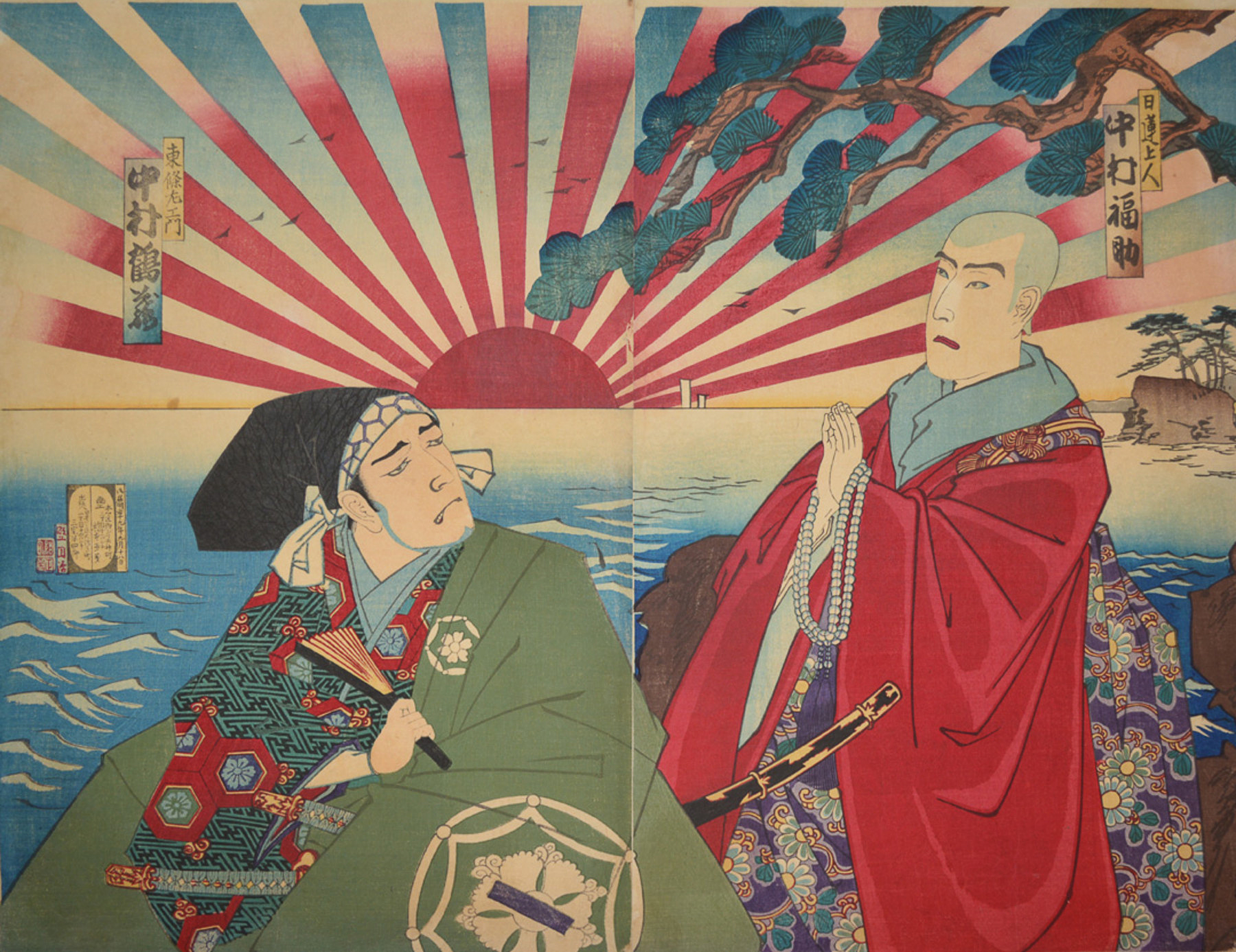
Kabuki actor Nakamura Fukusuke as Nichiren Shonin and Nakamura Kakuzo as Tojo Saemon by Toyohara Kunichika (1886)

=== Products ===
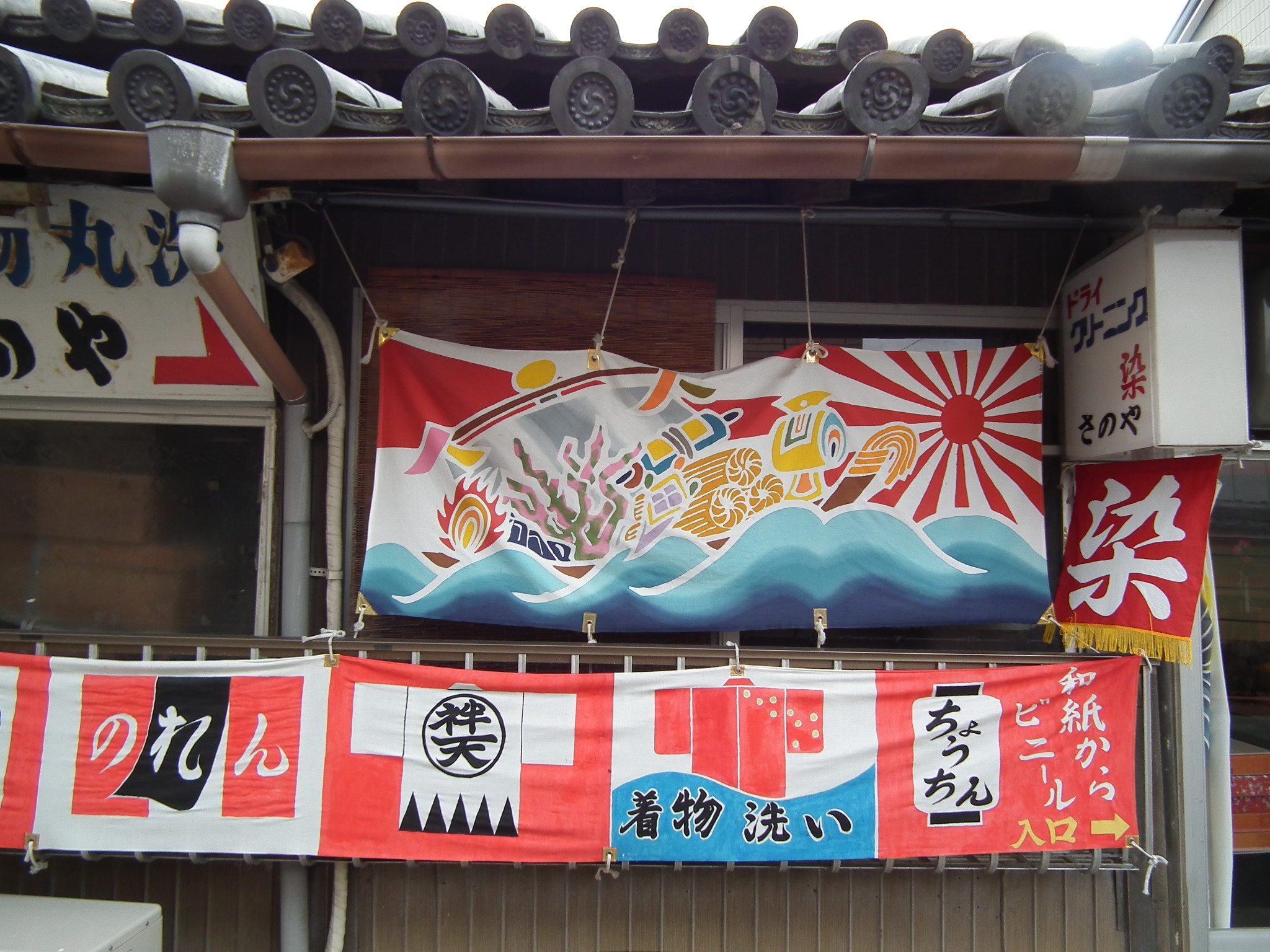
Tairyō-bata is a traditional Japanese fisherman's flag. Today it is used as a decorative flag on vessels and for festivals and events.

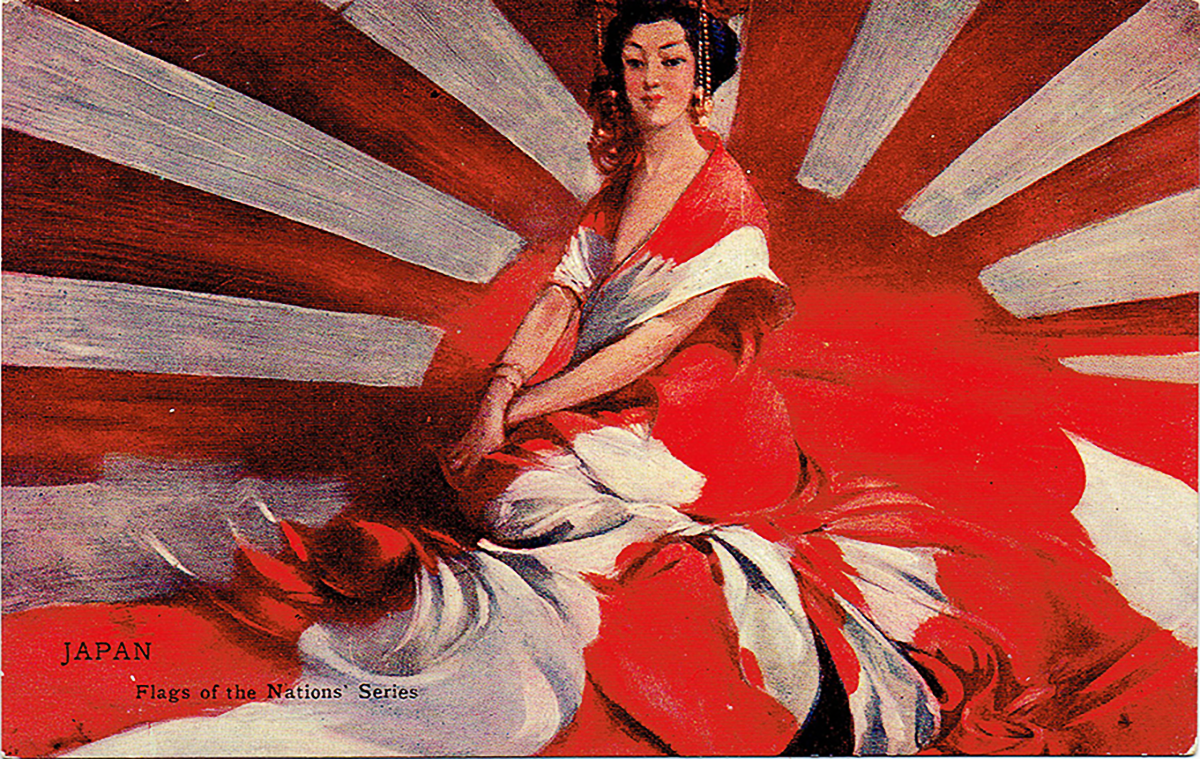
Postcard of a Japanese woman draped in the rising sun flag of Japan (1910)

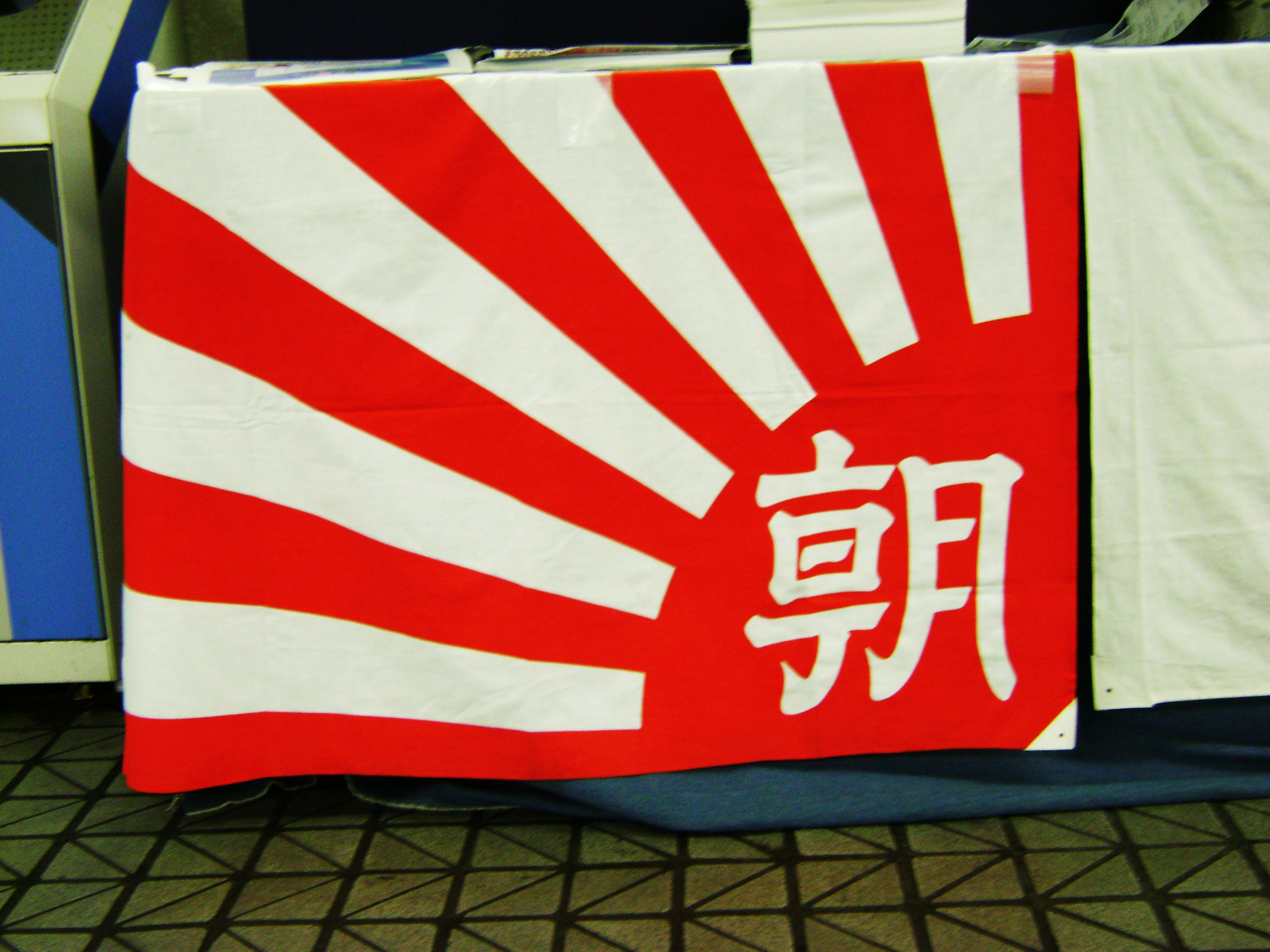
Flag of the Asahi Shimbun Company since 1889

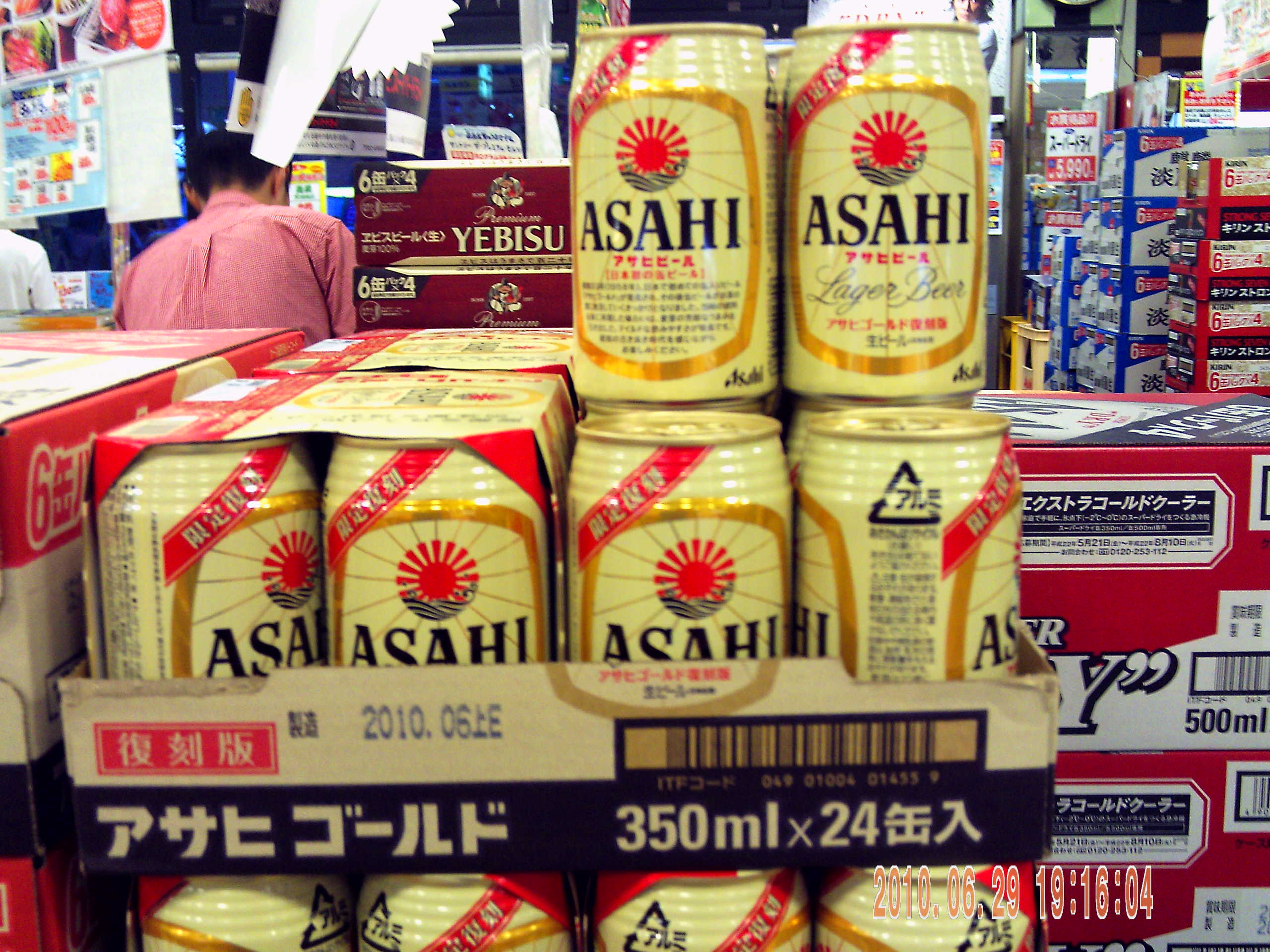
Asahi Gold Beer

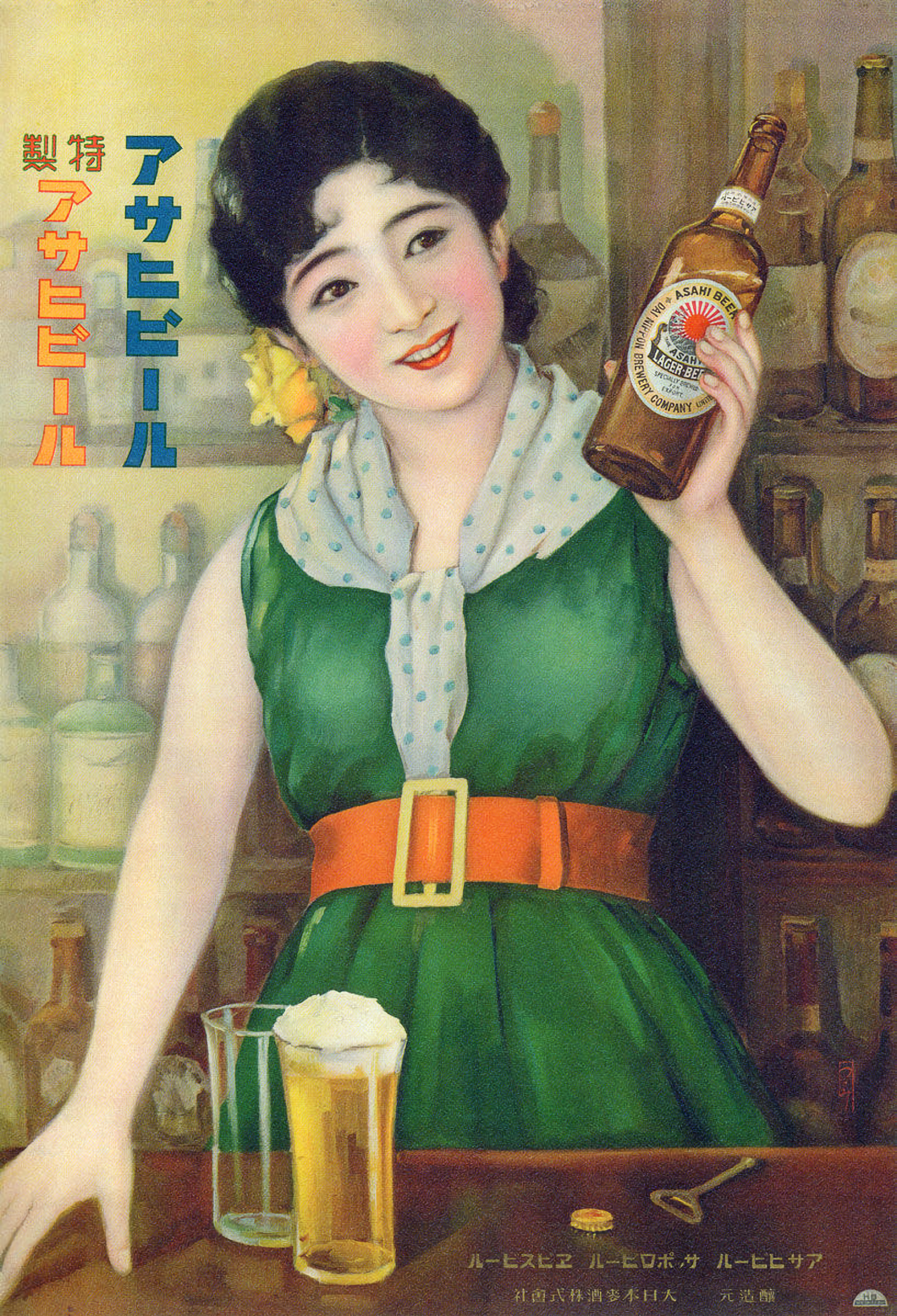
Asahi Beer poster. The Asahi logo is on the bottle label, 1920s.

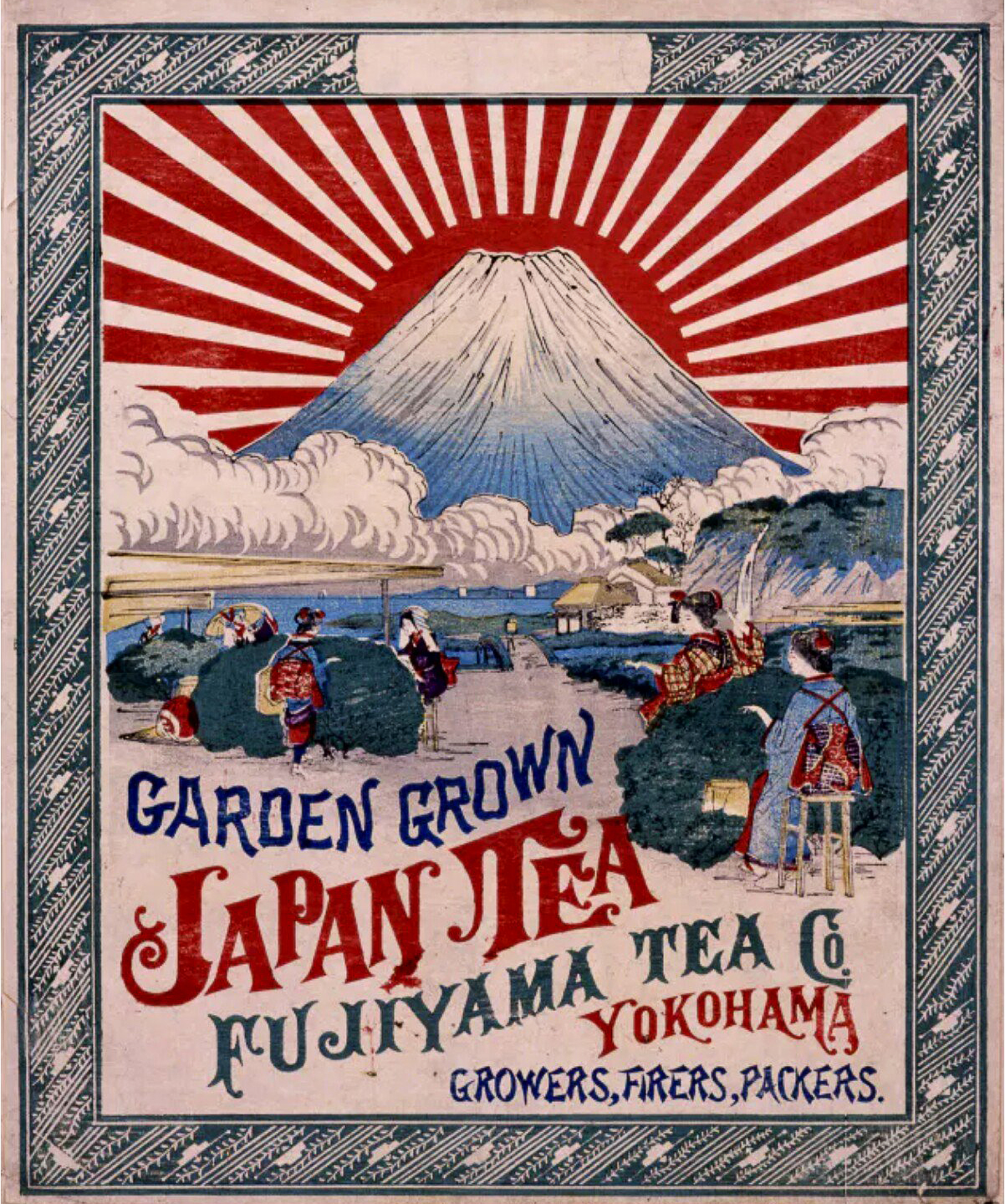
Wooden box label (Fujiyama Tea Co.) of Japanese green tea for export in the Meiji/Taisho period. Such a label was called 'orchid'.

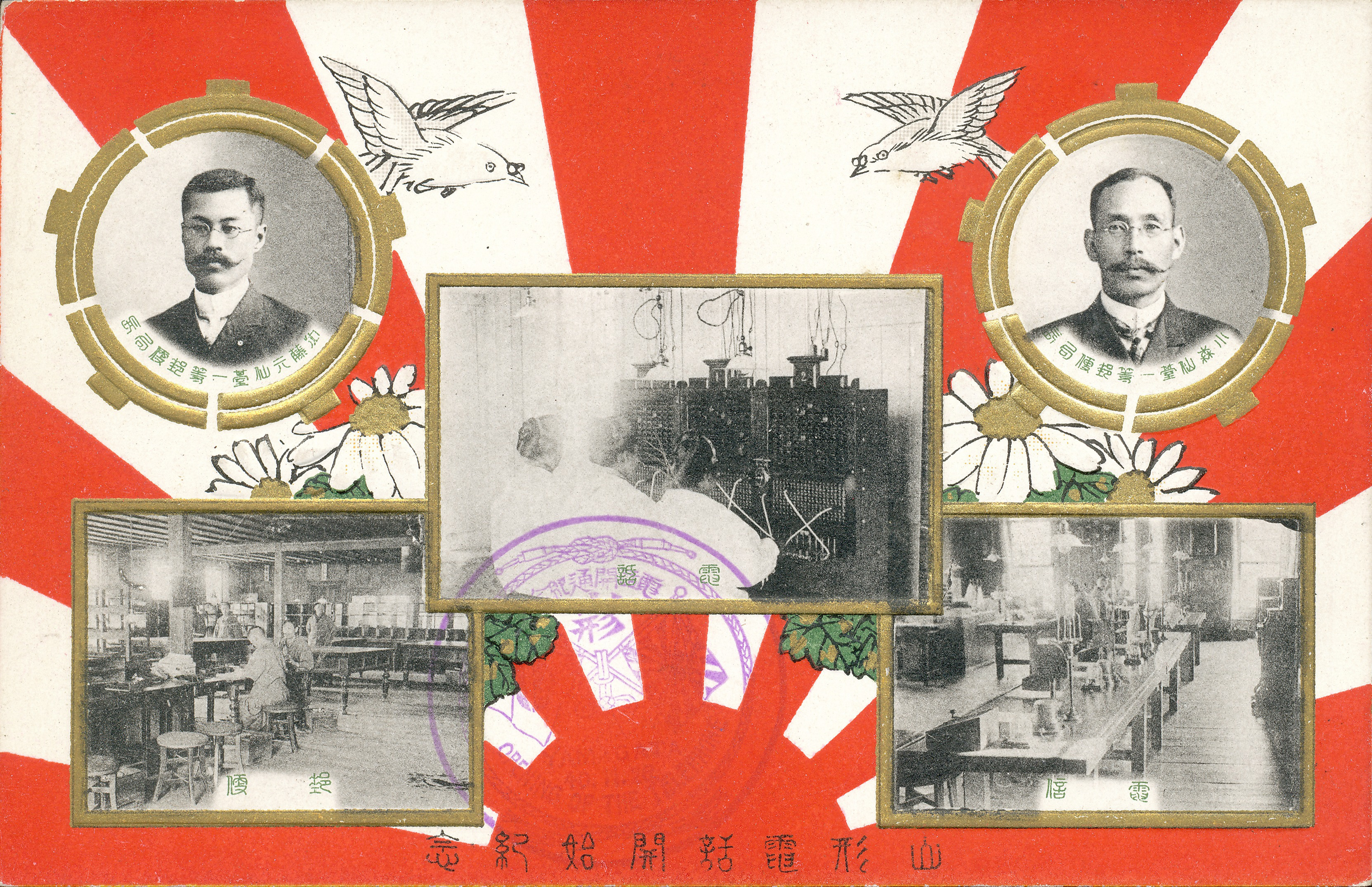
"Yamagata phone launch anniversary" postcard. Telephone exchange service began in Yamagata in 1907.

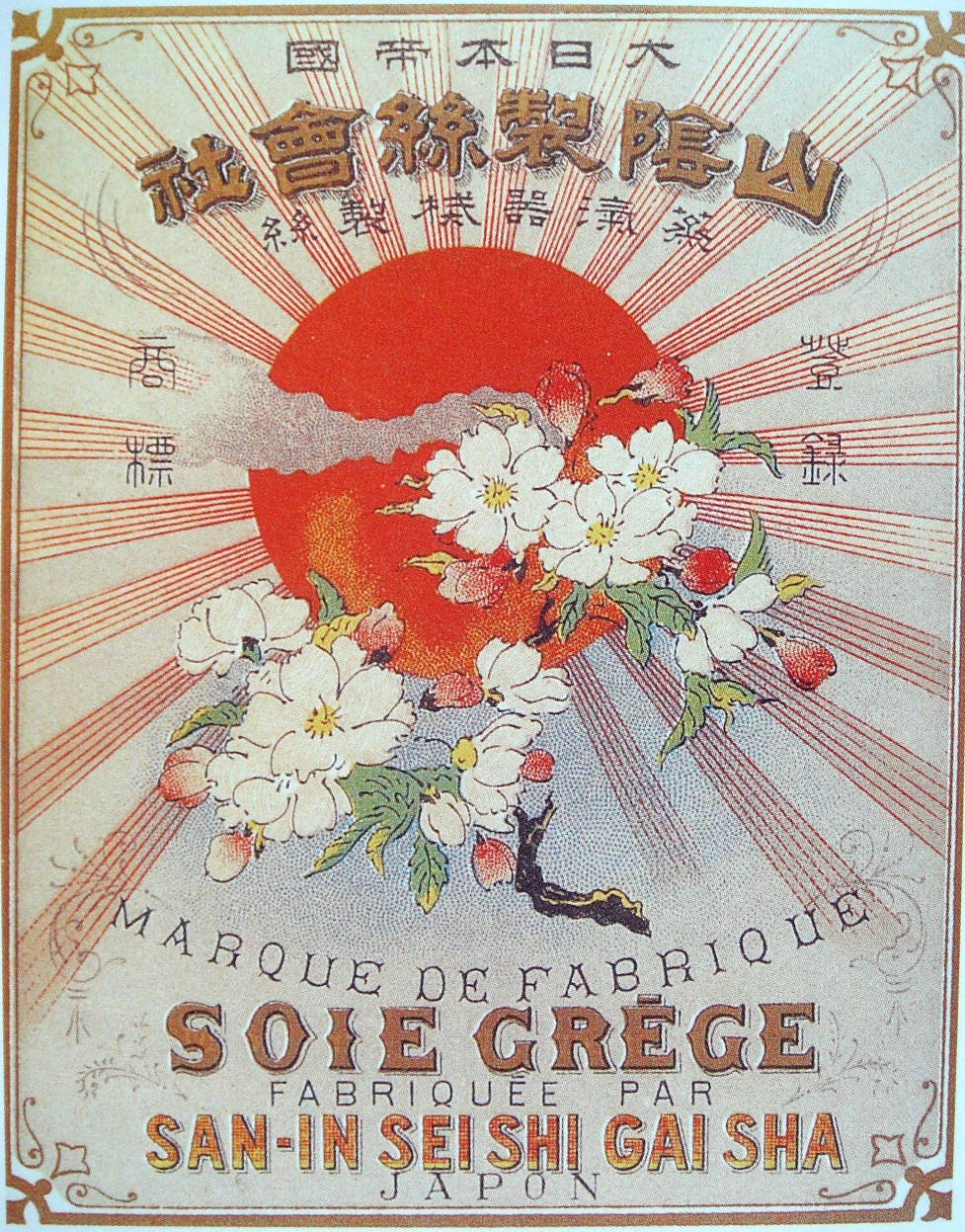
Japan raw silk pack sticker (in French and Japanese) (1880)

=== Sports ===
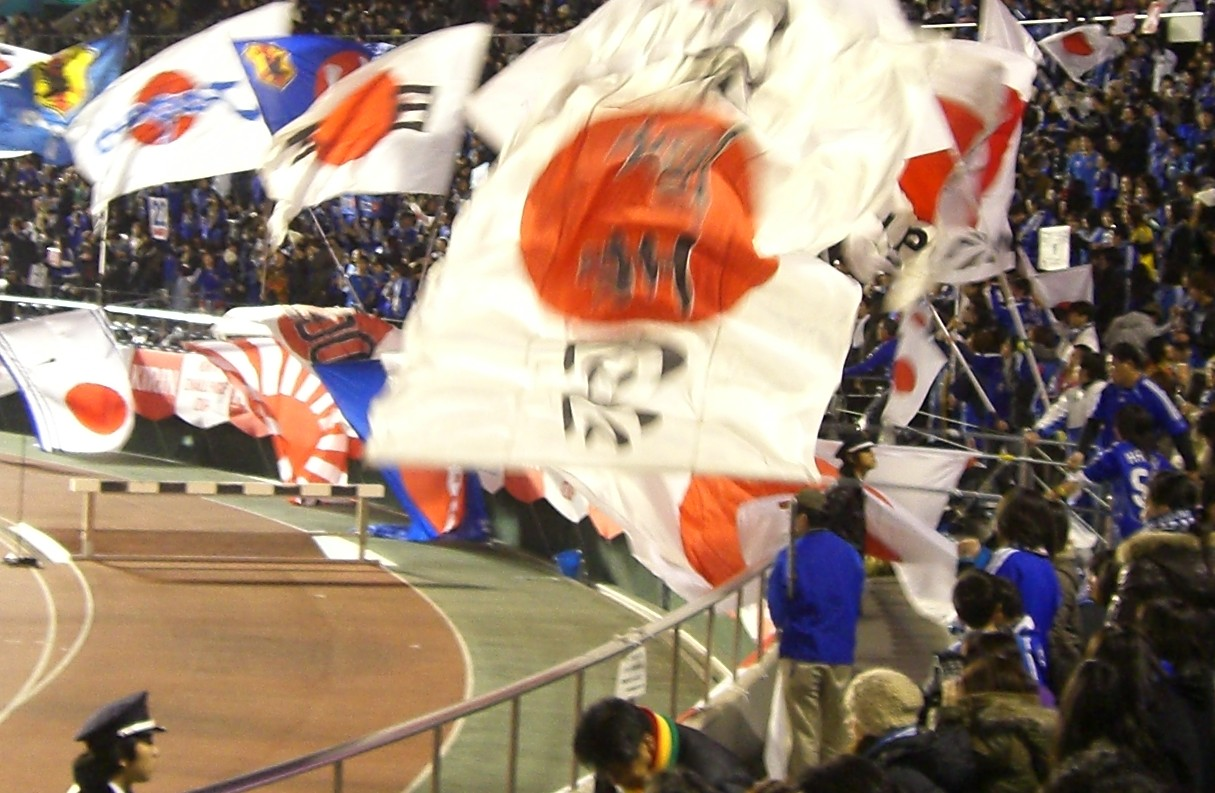
Japanese football fans wave a Rising Sun Flag during a Japan vs. Bosnia and Herzegovina match in January 2008

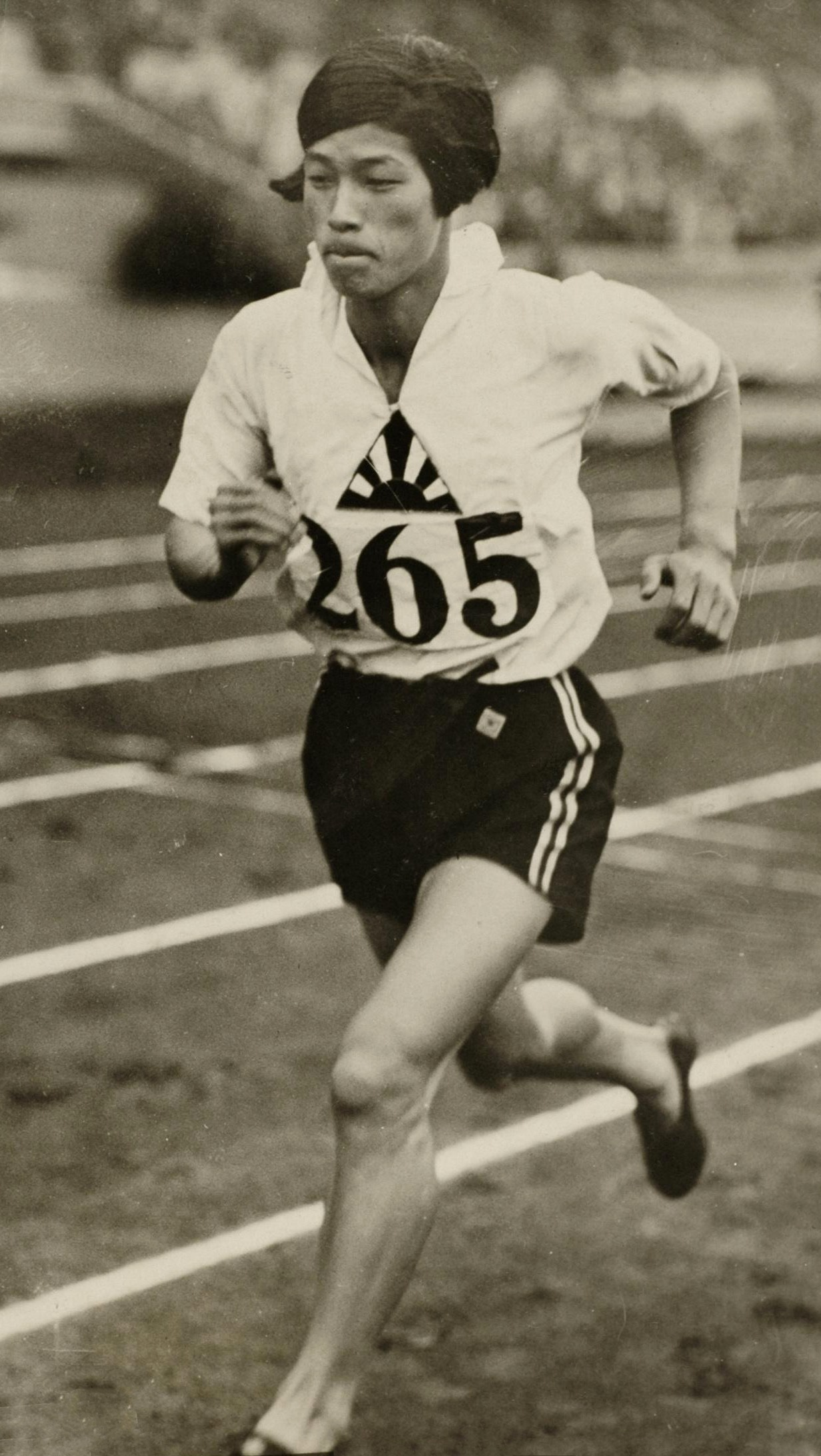
Japanese athlete Kinue Hitomi at the 1928 Summer Olympics

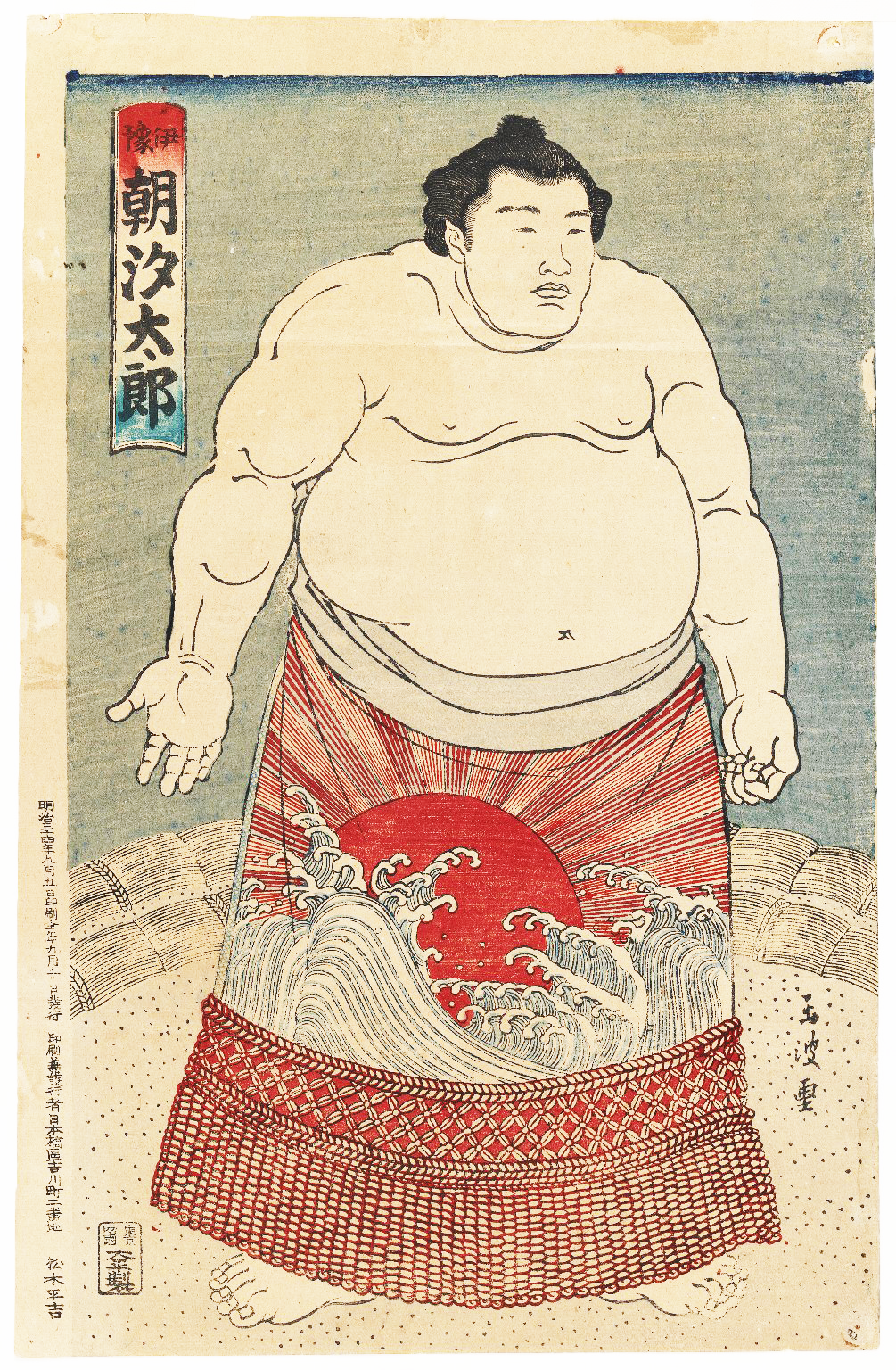
Sumo wrestler Asashio Tarō I with rising sun waves kesho mawashi, 1901

=== World War II ===
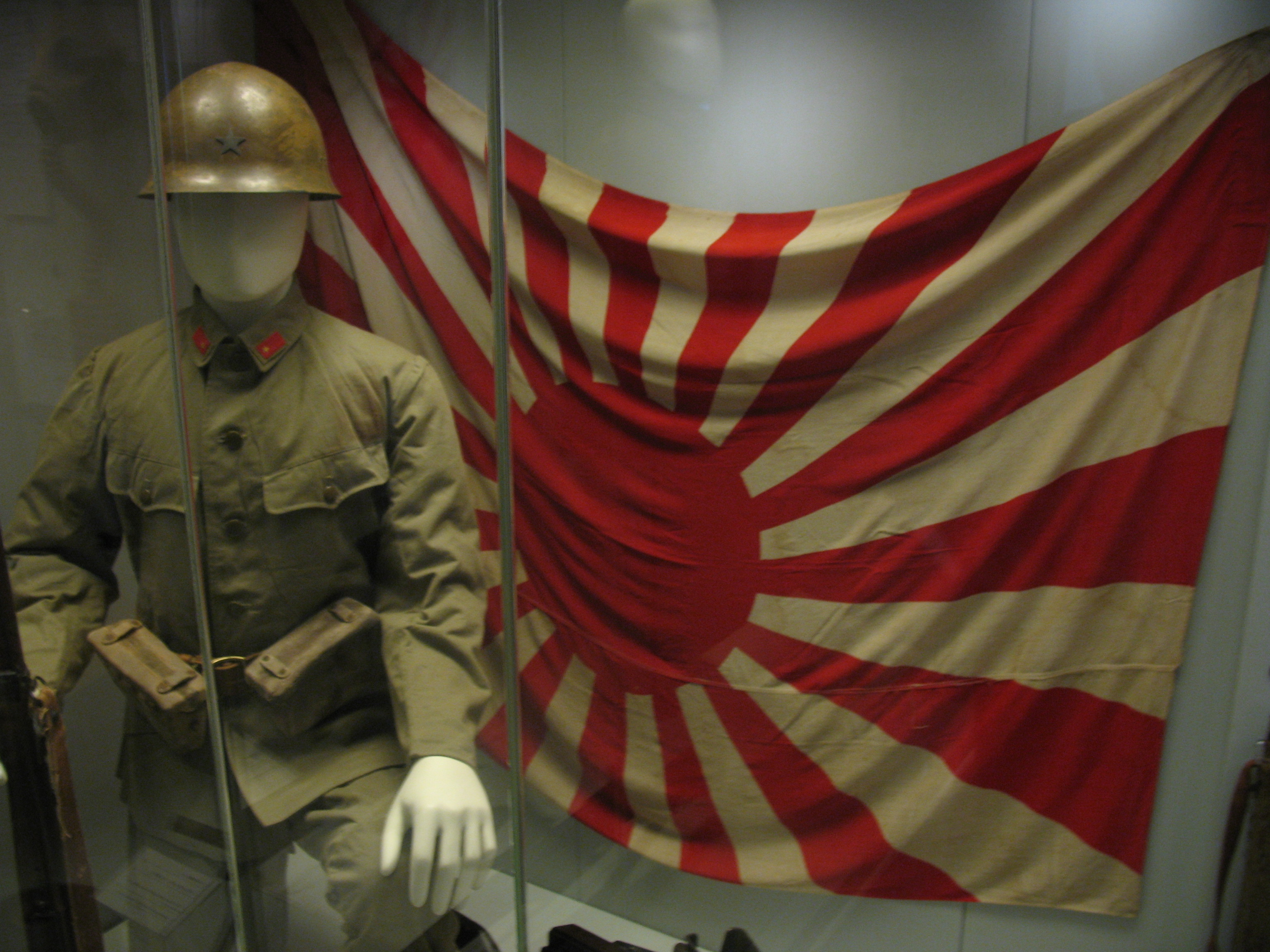
IJA uniform with IJA flag

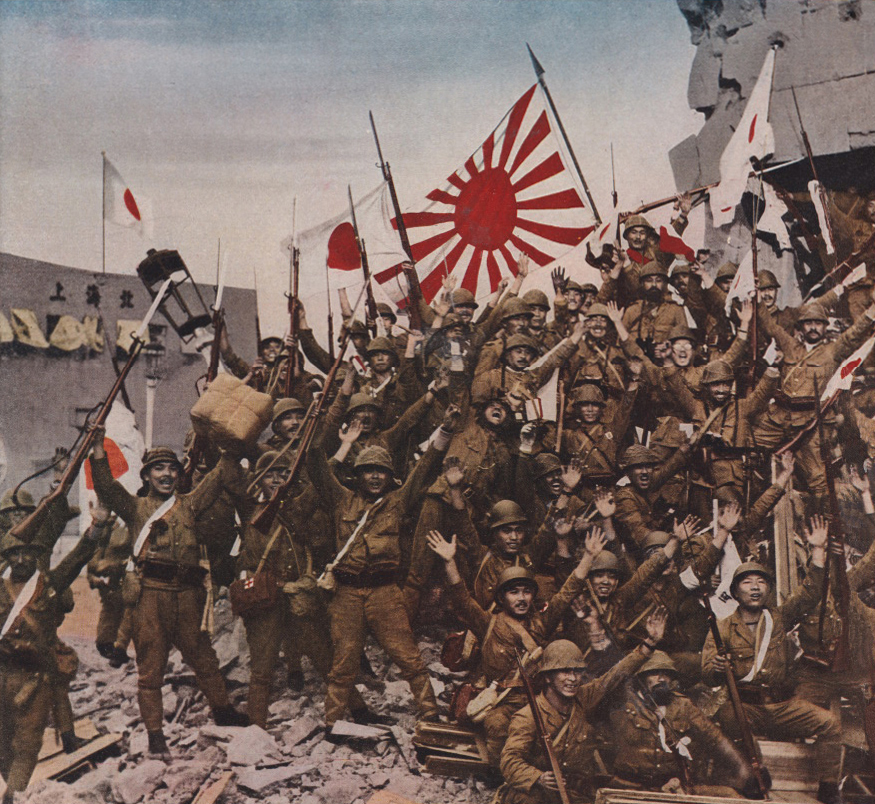
Invasion of China

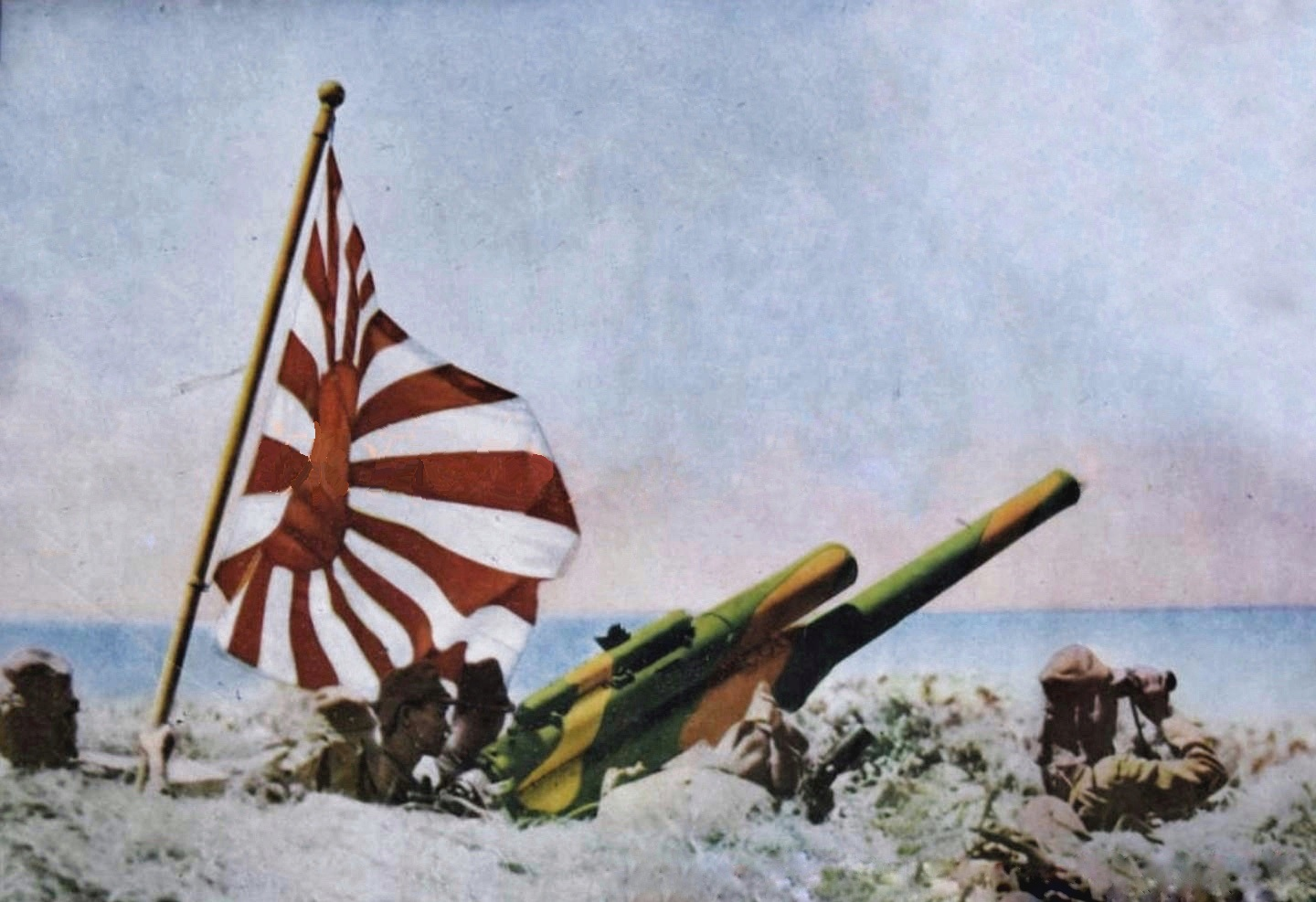
At Tarawa, late 1943

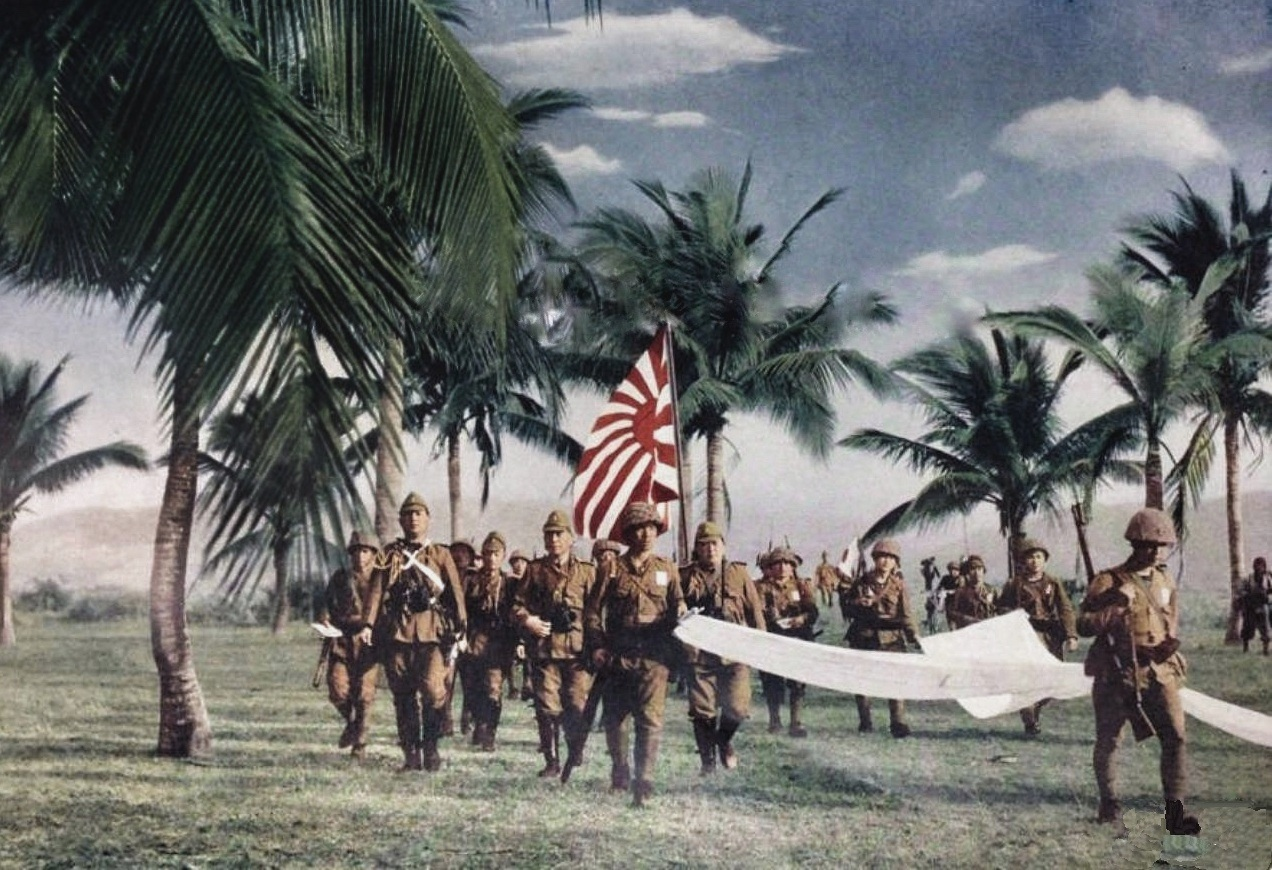
Invasion of New Guinea, January 1942

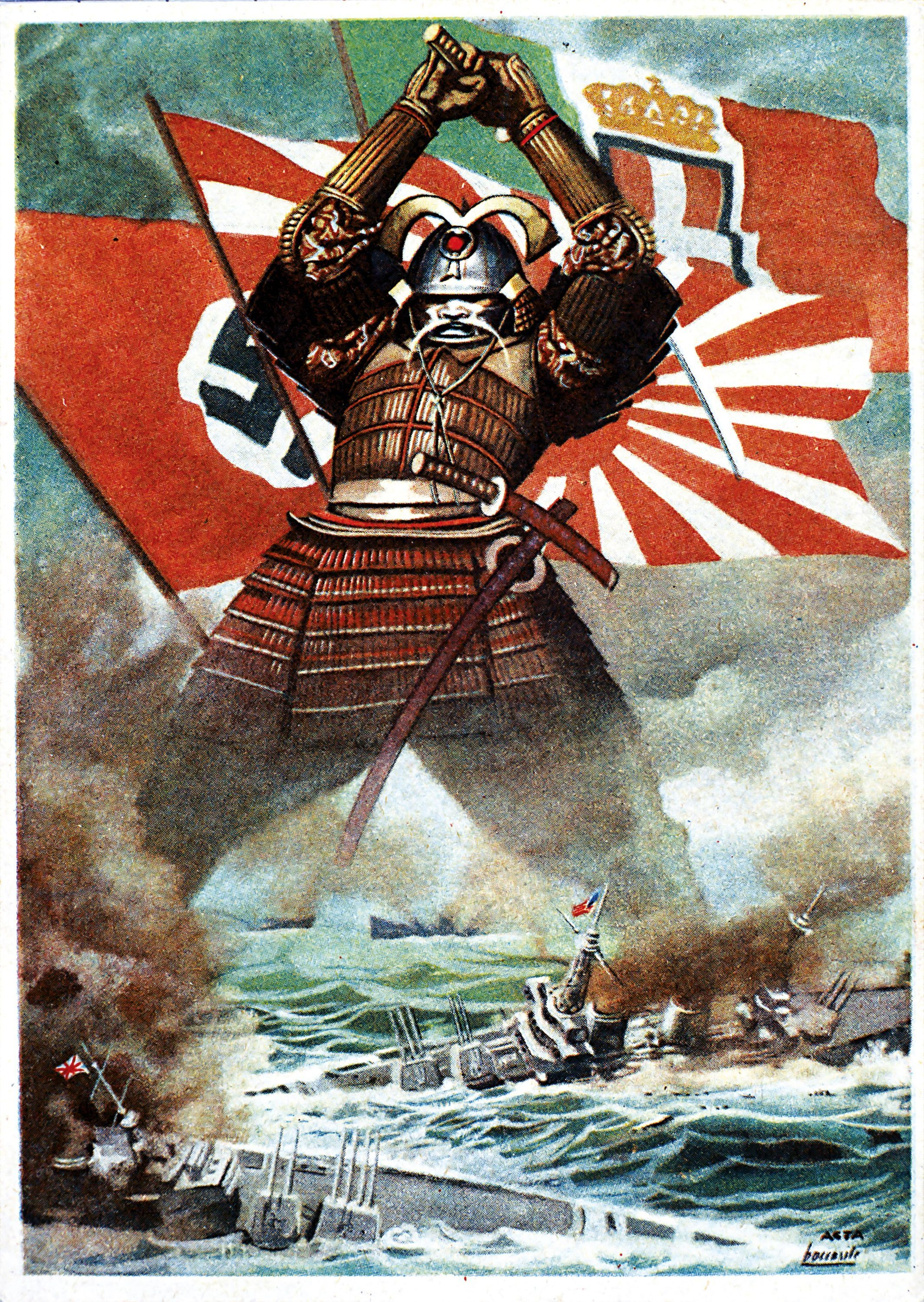
1942 Axis alliance poster

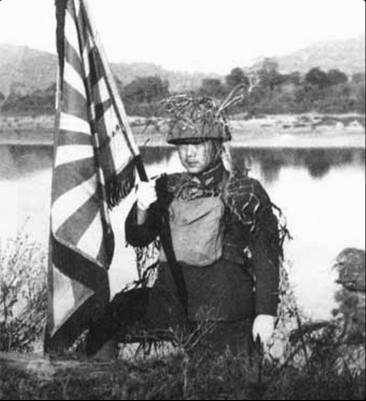
IJA in Burma, 1944

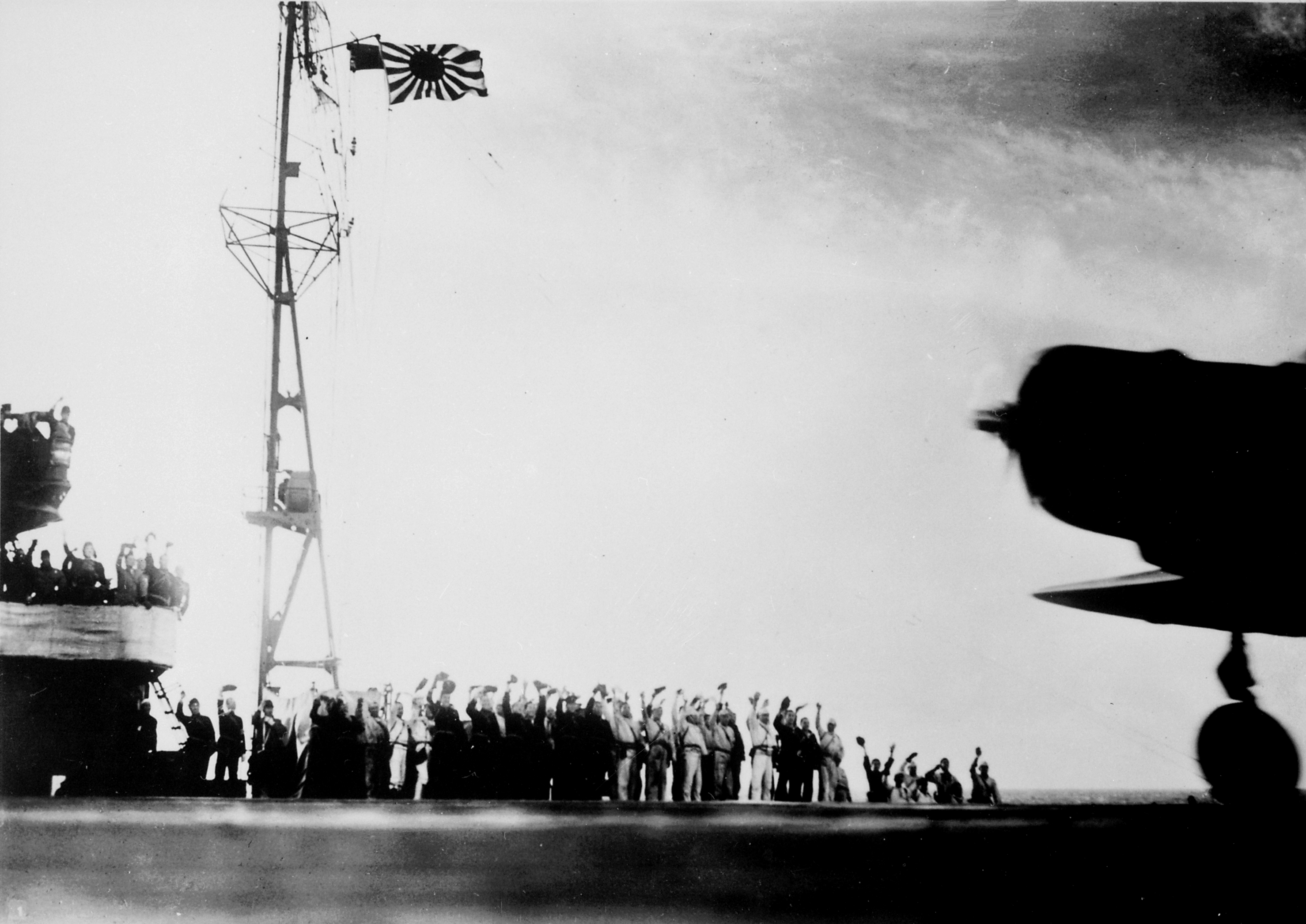
Aboard an IJN carrier with torpedo plane

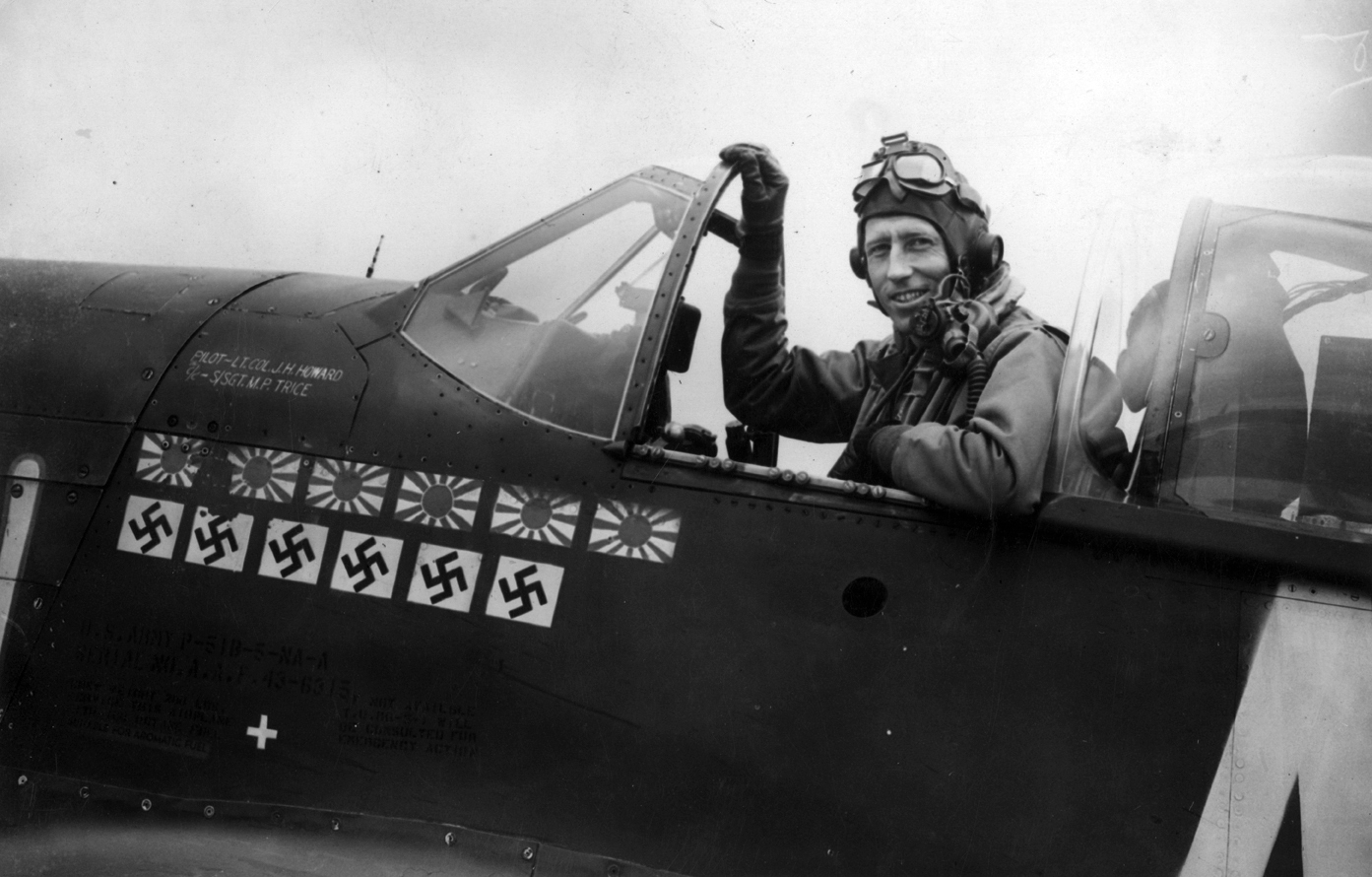
Rising sun flag marking downed Japanese aircraft on the fuselage side of an USAAF P-51D Mustang, during World War II

=== Japan Self-Defense Forces ===
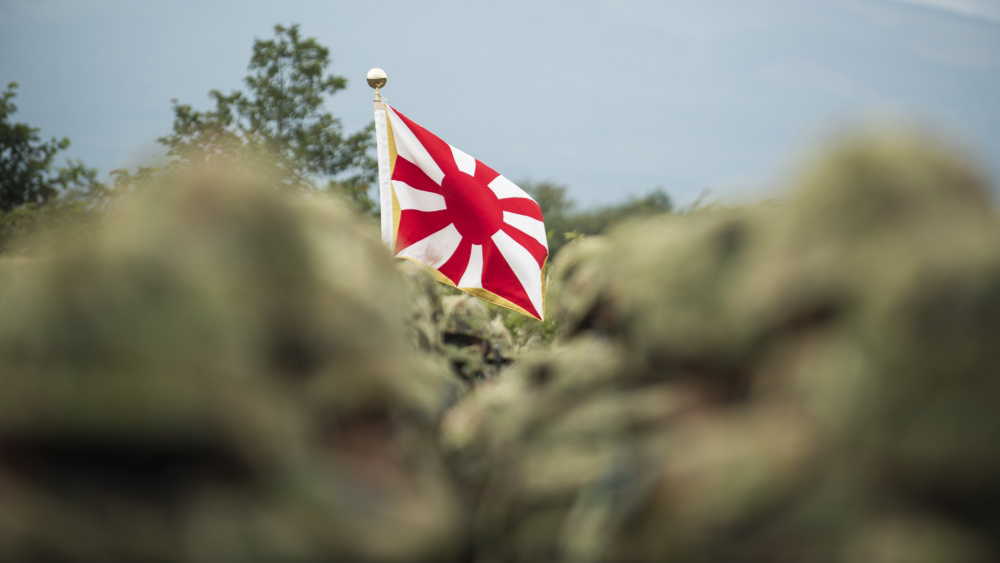
Japan Self-Defense Forces flag

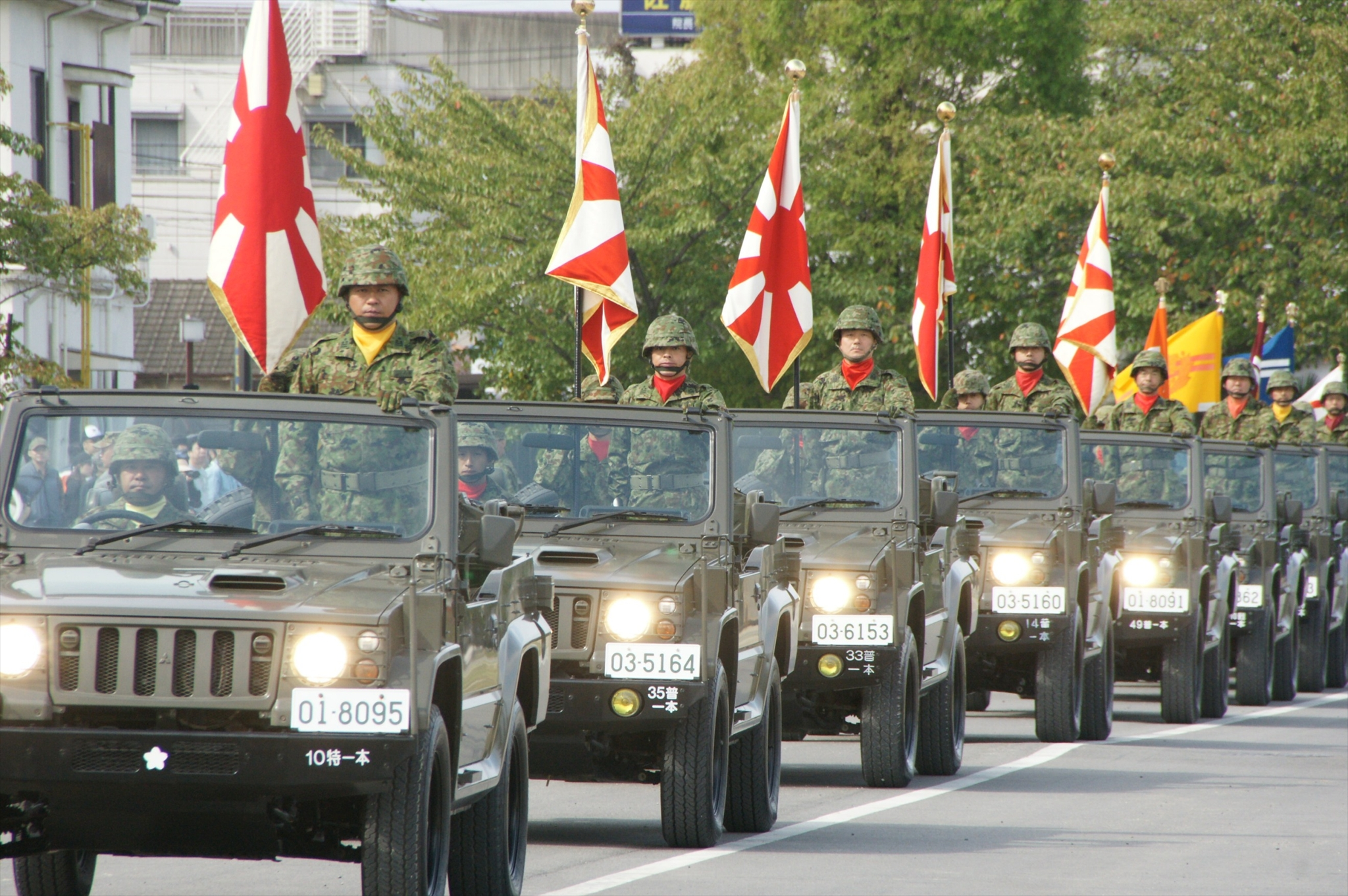
Viewing march by JGSDF regiment vehicle troops with the flag of the Japan Self-Defense Forces

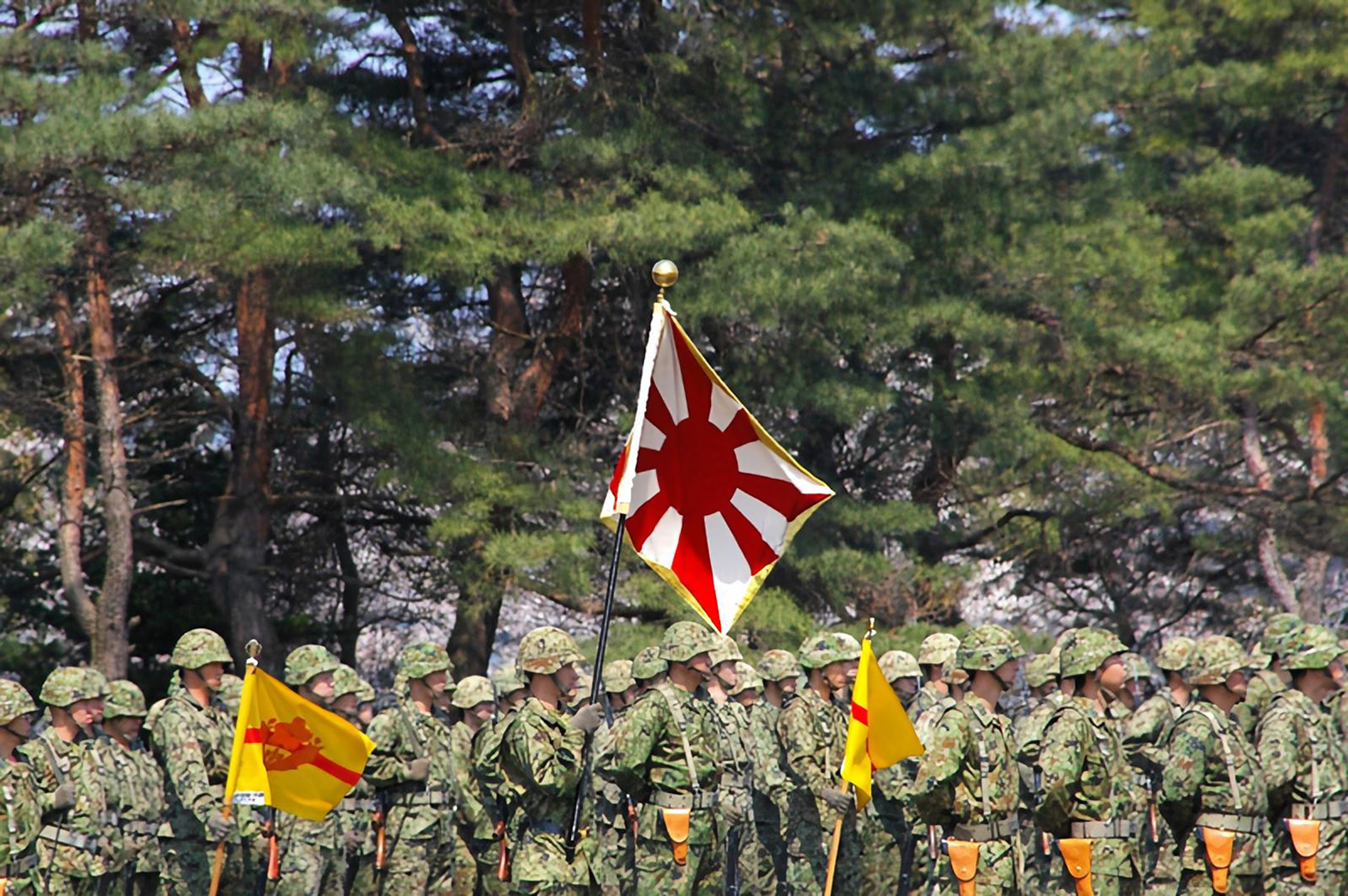
Ground Self-Defense Force Utsunomiya gemstone site commemorative event with the Self-Defense Forces flag

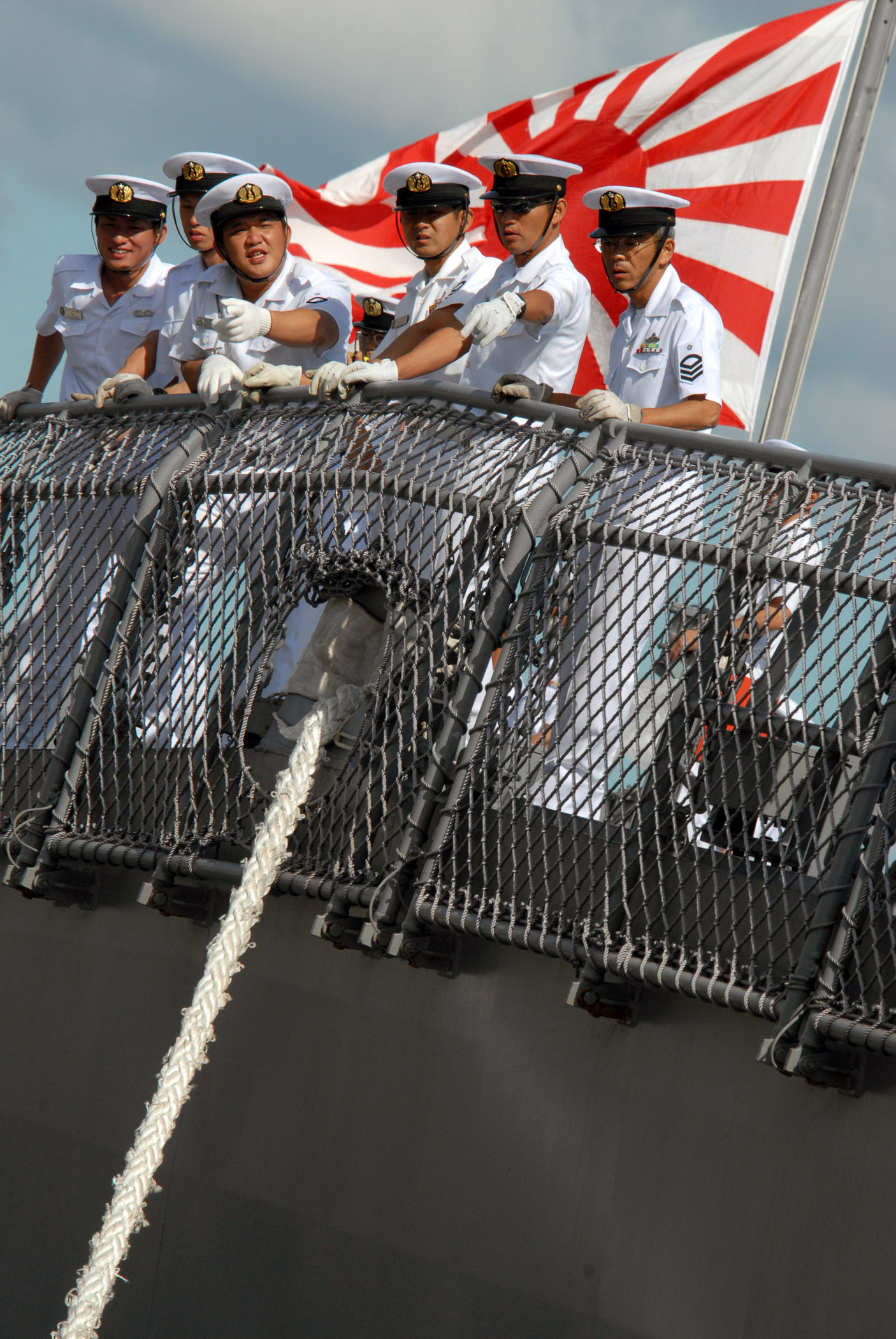
Japan Maritime Self-Defense Force members of the crew of JDS Kongō

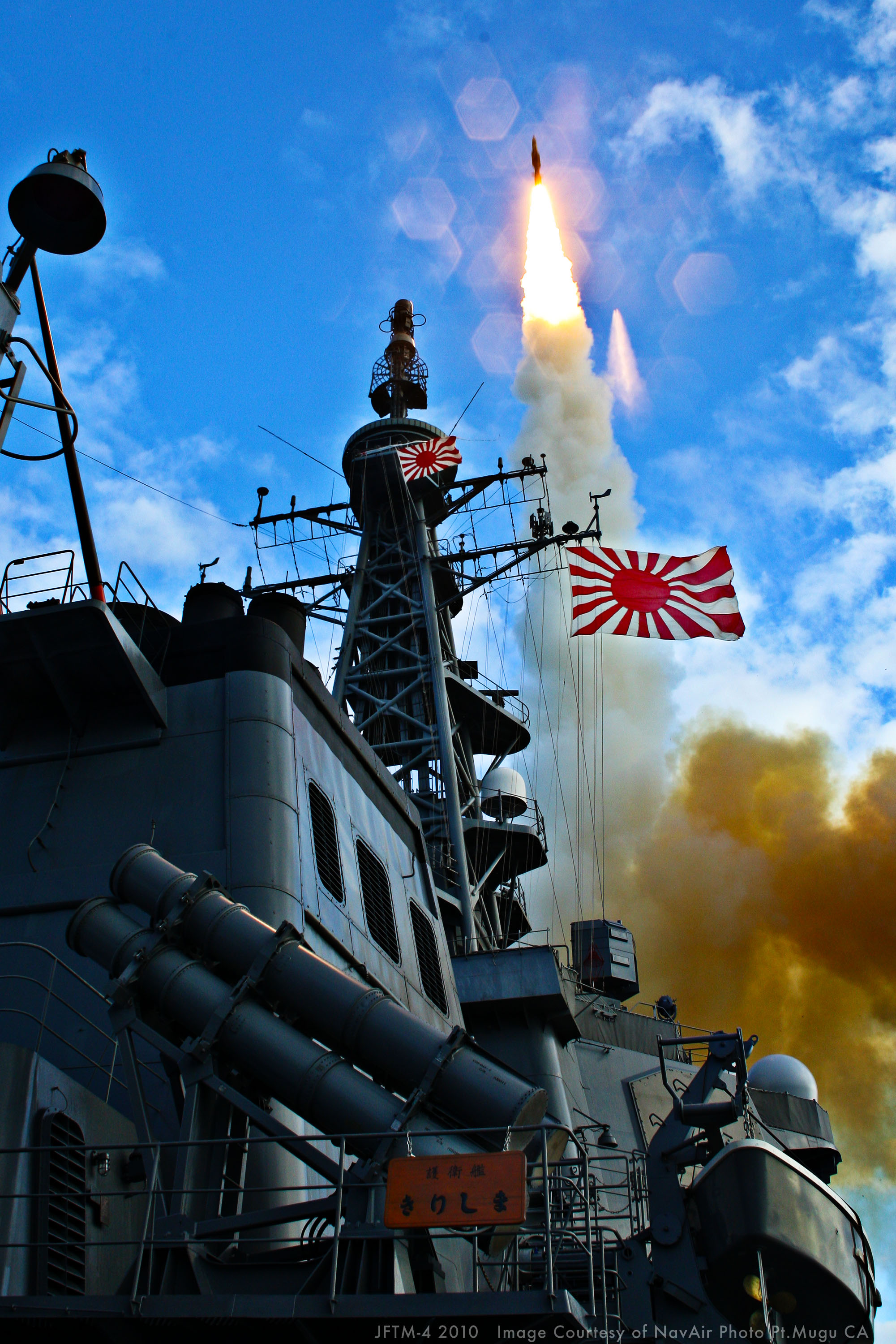
An SM-3 (Block 1A) missile is launched from the Japan Maritime Self-Defense Force destroyer JS Kirishima.

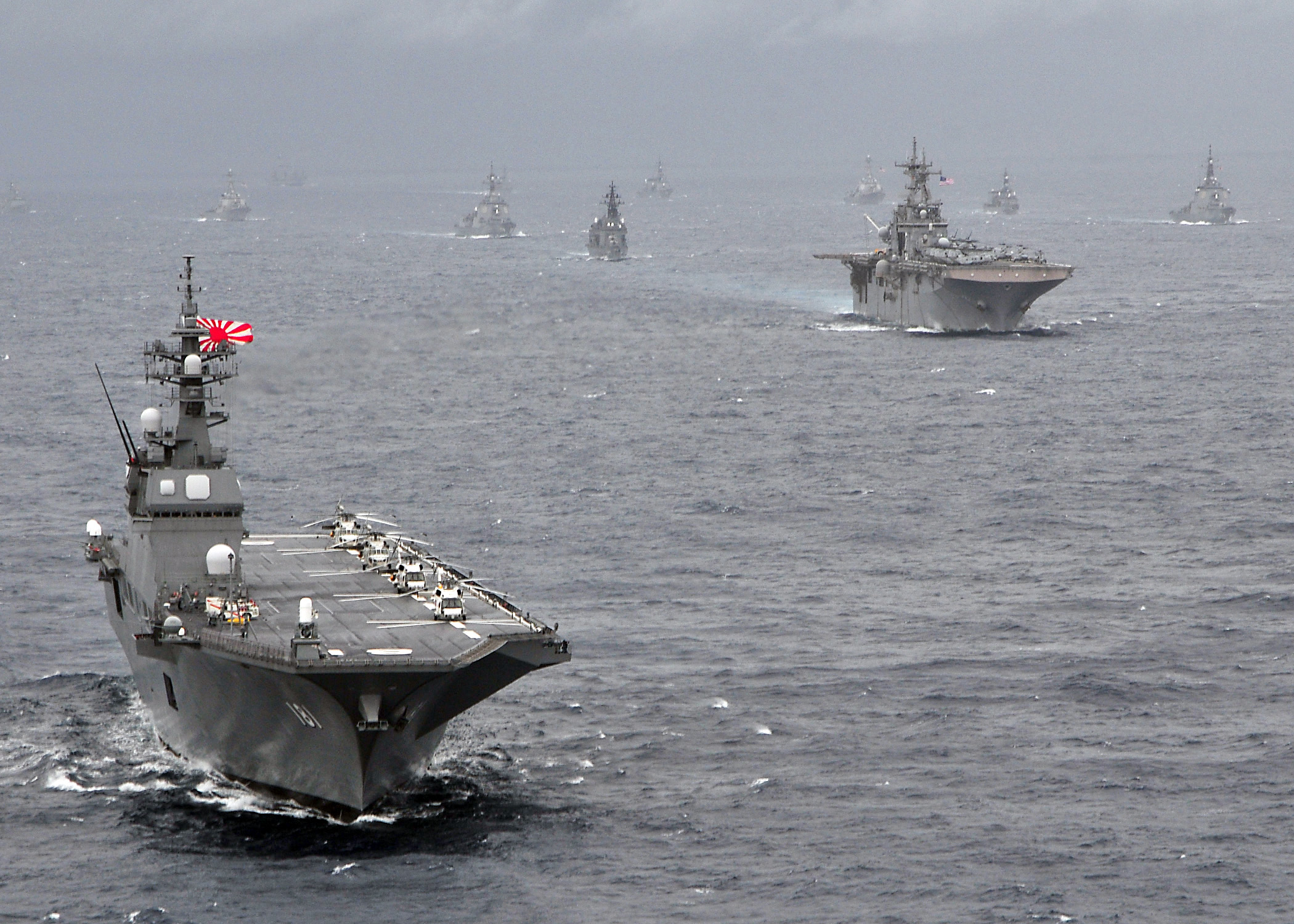
JS Hyūga

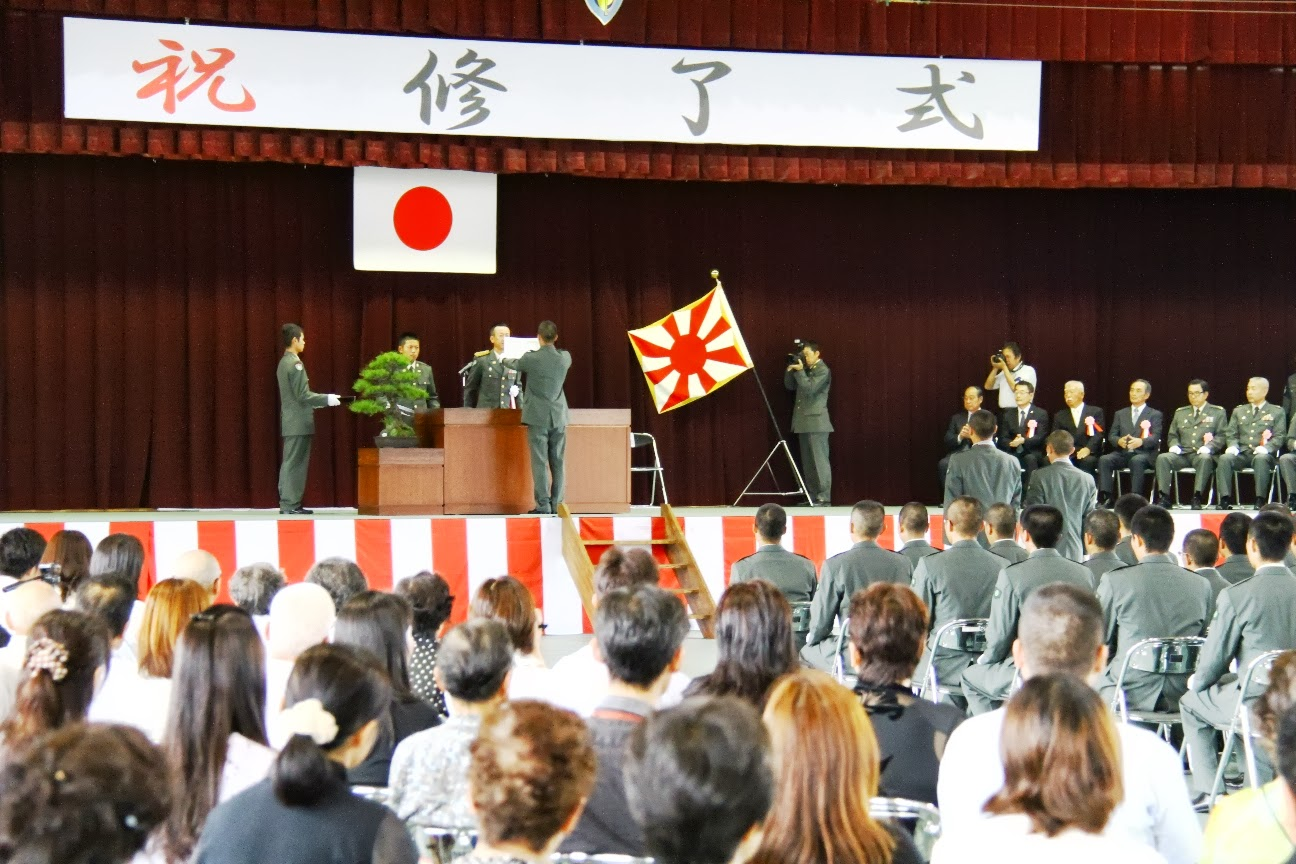
Self-Defense Forces flag of the JGSDF 46th Infantry Regiment

=== Modern-day United States military ===
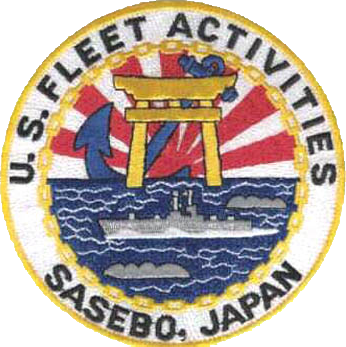
Emblem of United States Fleet Activities Sasebo

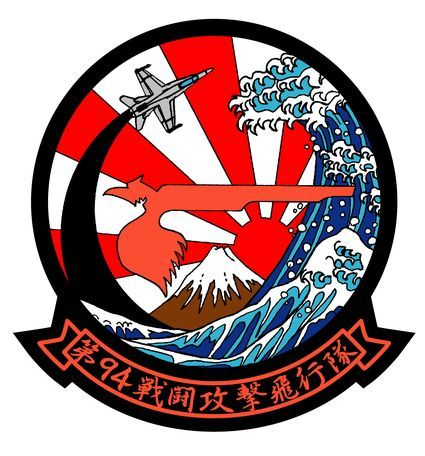
Patch of Strike Fighter Squadron 94

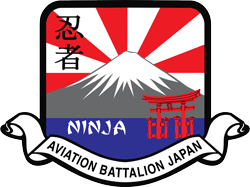
Emblem of U.S. Army Aviation Battalion Japan

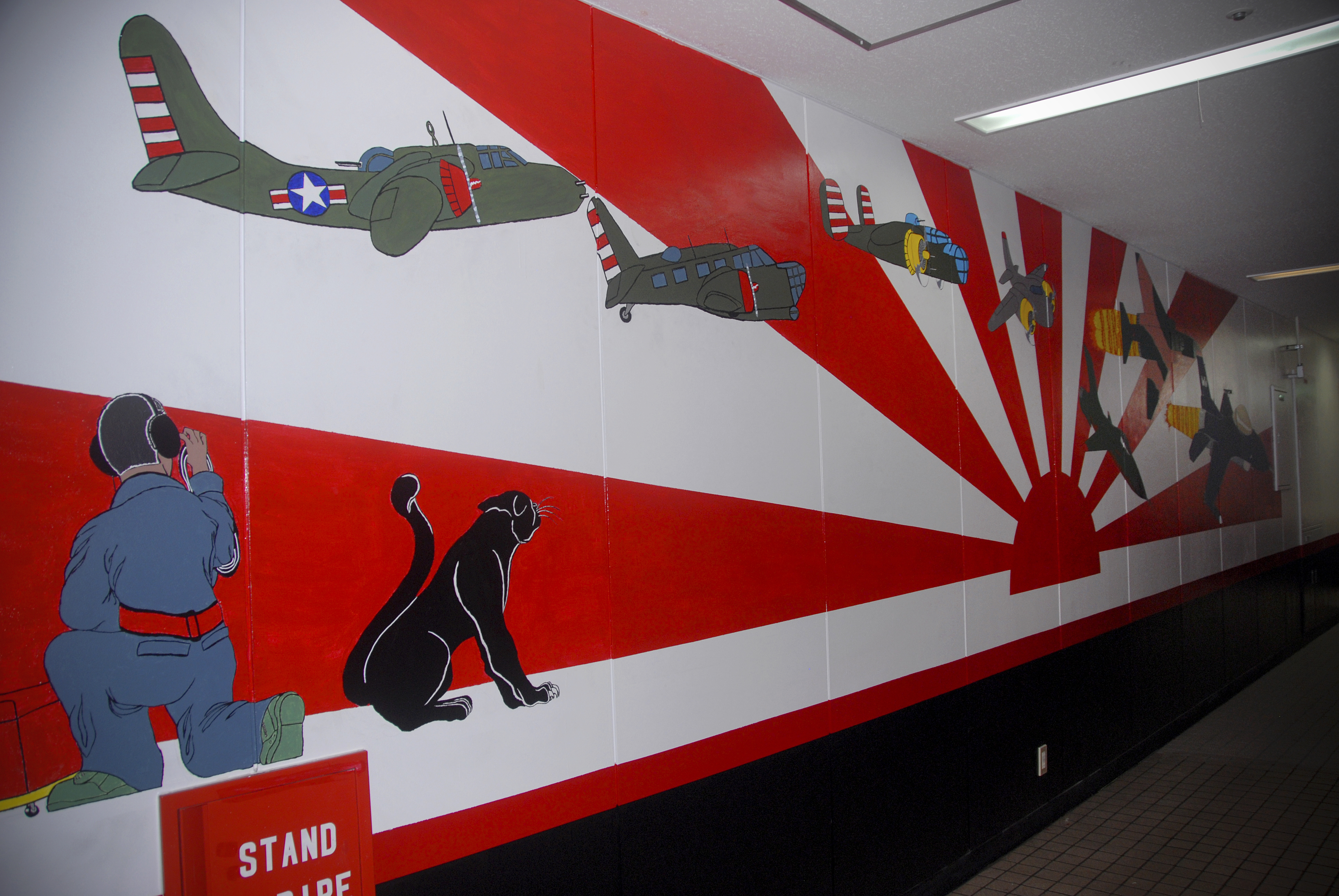
The mural painted on a wall at Misawa Air Base, Japan

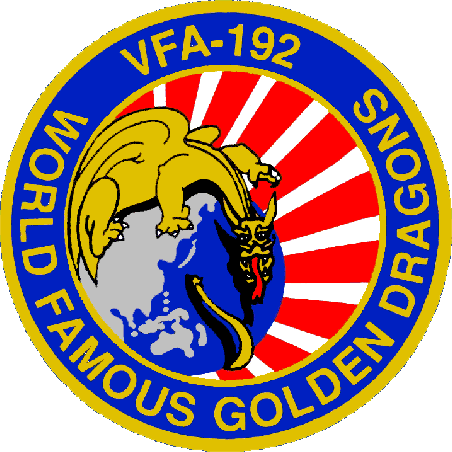
Former insignia of Strike Fighter Squadron 192

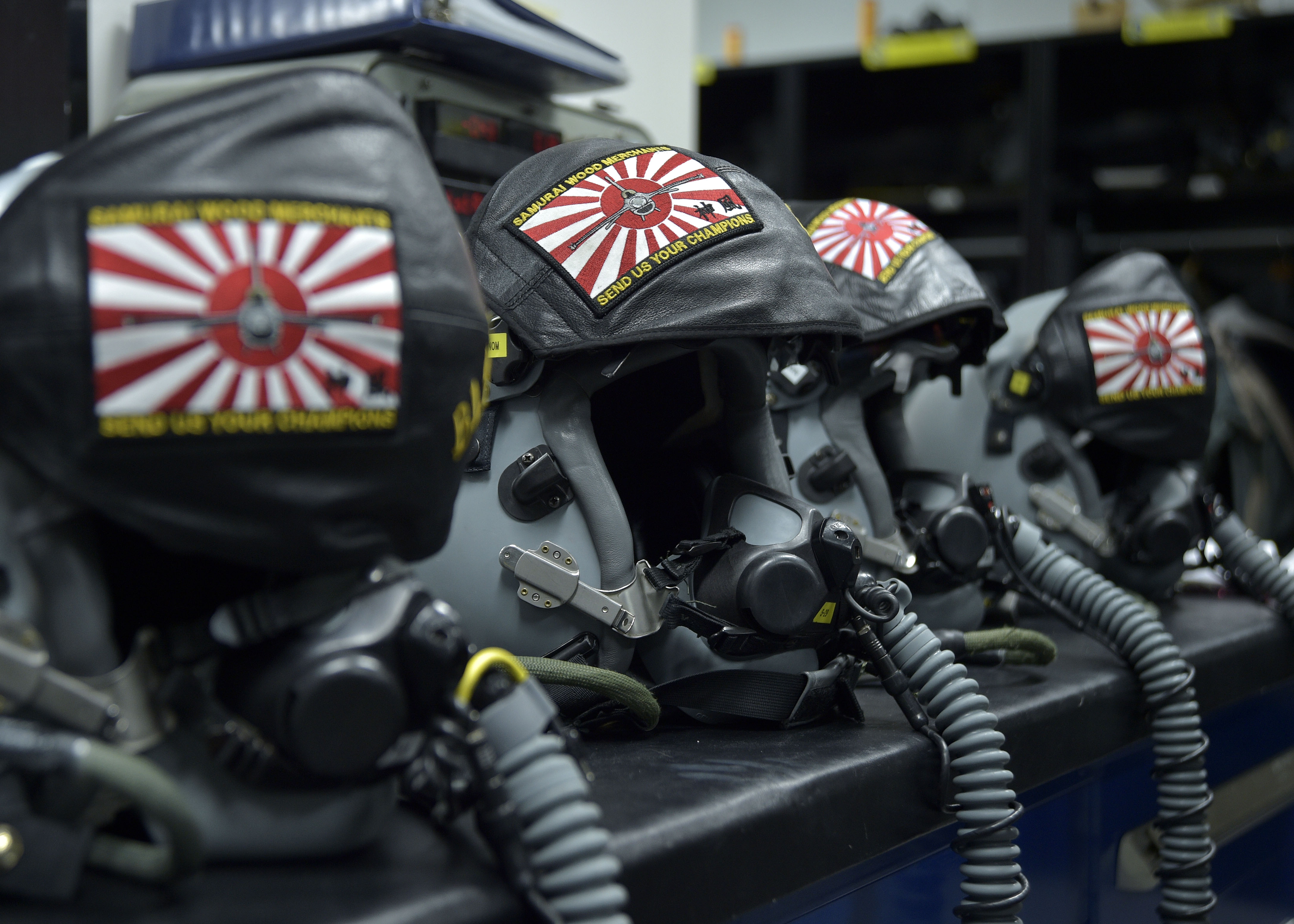
Joint Helmet Mounted Cueing System with patches of the 14th Fighter Squadron

== See also ==
- List of flags of the Wehrmacht and Heer (1933–1945)
- List of flags of the German Navy (1935–1945)
- Imperial Seal of Japan
- List of Japanese flags
- Lists of Japanese municipal flags
- Fascist symbolism
- Reichskriegsflagge – War flags and war ensigns used by the German armed forces
