= National symbols of Japan =

National symbols of Japan are the symbols that are used in Japan to represent what is unique about the nation, reflecting different aspects of its cultural life and history.

== Symbols of Japan ==
	Symbol	Image	References
Flag	Flag of Japan	Hinomaru	
Crest	Chrysanthemum crest (Chrysanthemum morifolium)	Imperial crest of Japan	
National anthem	Kimigayo 君が代	Kimigayo	
Government crest	5–7 paulownia (Paulownia)	Government crest of Japan	
National butterfly	Great purple emperor (Sasakia charonda)	Great purple emperor	
National tree	Cherry blossom (Prunus serrulata)	Cherry blossom tree	
National flower (de facto)	Cherry blossom (Prunus serrulata) and Chrysanthemum morifolium	Cherry blossom flower Chrysanthemum morifolium flower	
National bird	Green pheasant (Phasianus versicolor)	Green pheasant	
National fish	Koi (Cyprinus carpio)	Japanese Koi	
National instrument	Koto	Japanese Koto	
National stone	Jade	Jade	
De facto National mount	Mount Fuji (Fujisan)	Mount Fuji	
De facto National sport	Sumo	Sumo	
Flag of the Japan Maritime Self-Defense Force	Rising Sun Flag	Naval Ensign of Japan	
Flag of the Japan Self-Defense Forces and the Japan Ground Self-Defense Force	Japan Self-Defense Forces	Naval Ensign of Japan	
National personification	Yamato-hime, Samurai		
National founder	Emperor Jimmu (神武天皇 Jinmu-tennō)	Emperor Jimmu	
National dish	Sushi, sashimi, ramen	Sushi	
National liquor	Sake	Sake	
National fruit	Japanese persimmon	Japanese persimmon	
National currency	Japanese yen	Japanese Yen coins	
National dance	Noh Mai	Emperor Jimmu	
National poet	Matsuo Bashō	Matsuo Bashō	
National epic	Kojiki, Nihon Shoki, The Tale of the Bamboo Cutter (Taketori Monogatari), The Tale of the Heike (Heike Monogatari)	Nihon Shoki	
National colours	Primary colours: Red and white; Secondary colours: Black, blue (sports), white and spring bud (only used in football)	Red (primary) #be0029 White (primary) #FFFFFF Black (secondary) #000000 Blue (secondary) #00008b White (secondary) #FFFFFF Spring bud (secondary) #e8f48c	
National microorganism	Aspergillus oryzae	Aspergillus oryzae is used in a number of traditional fermented foods such as sake, soy sauce, and miso.	
