= Ten-ei, Fukushima =

Ten'ei 天栄村
- Village
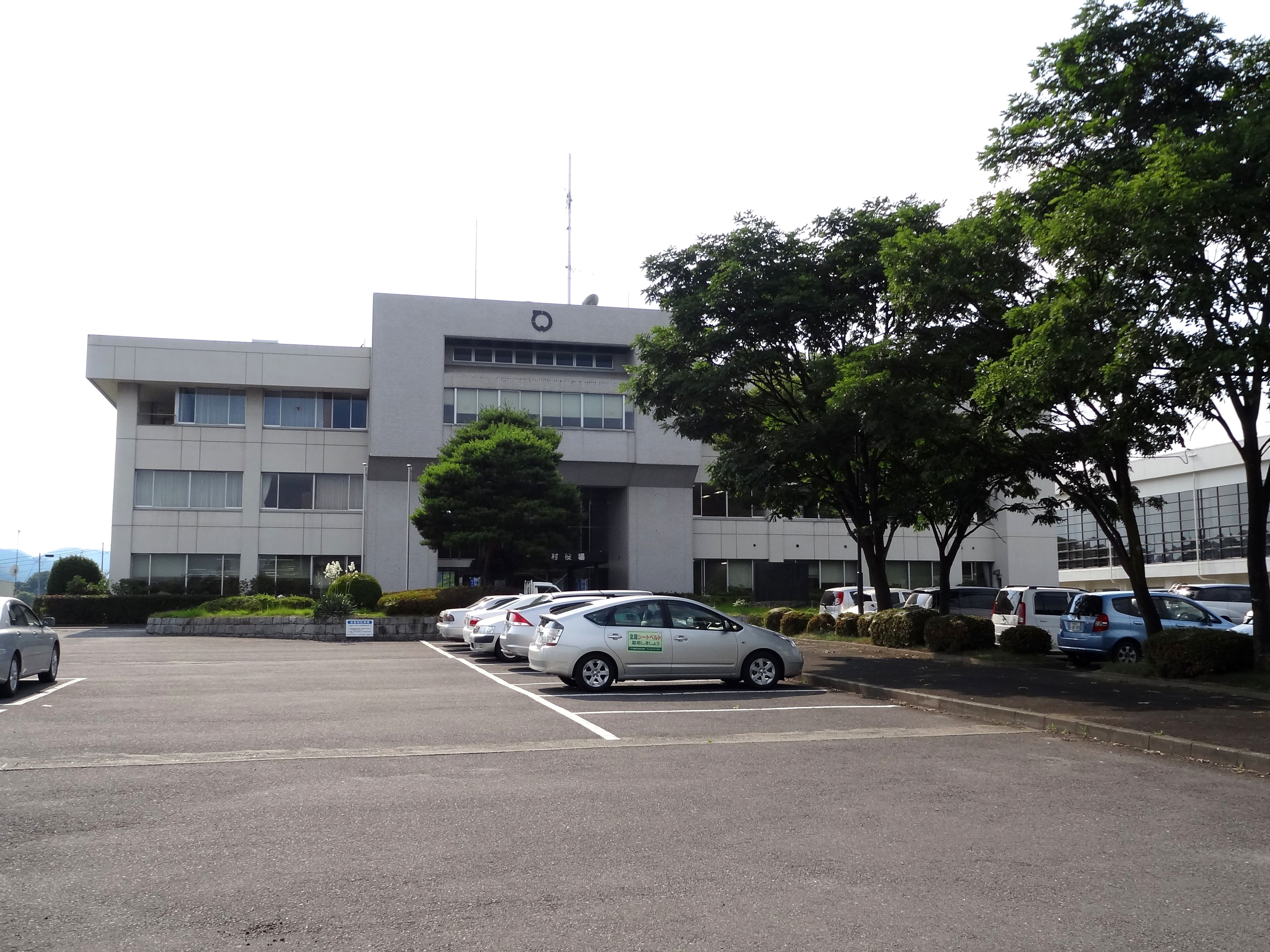
- Ten'ei Village Hall

- Flag Seal

- Location of Ten'ei in Fukushima Prefecture

- Coordinates: 37°15′19.4″N 140°14′49.5″E
- Country: Japan
- Region: Tōhoku
- Prefecture: Fukushima
- District: Iwase

Area
  - Total: 225.52 km^{2} (87.07 sq mi)

Population (January 2020)
  - Total: 5,258
  - Density: 23.32/km^{2} (60.39/sq mi)
- Time zone: UTC+9 (Japan Standard Time)
- Phone number: 0248-82-2111
- Address: 78 Shimomatsumoto Harabatake, Ten'ei-mura, Iwase-gun, Fukushima-ken 962-0492
- Climate: Dfb
- Website: Official website
- Symbols
- Bird: Japanese bush warbler
- Flower: Gentiana scabra
- Tree: Styphnolobium japonicum, pine

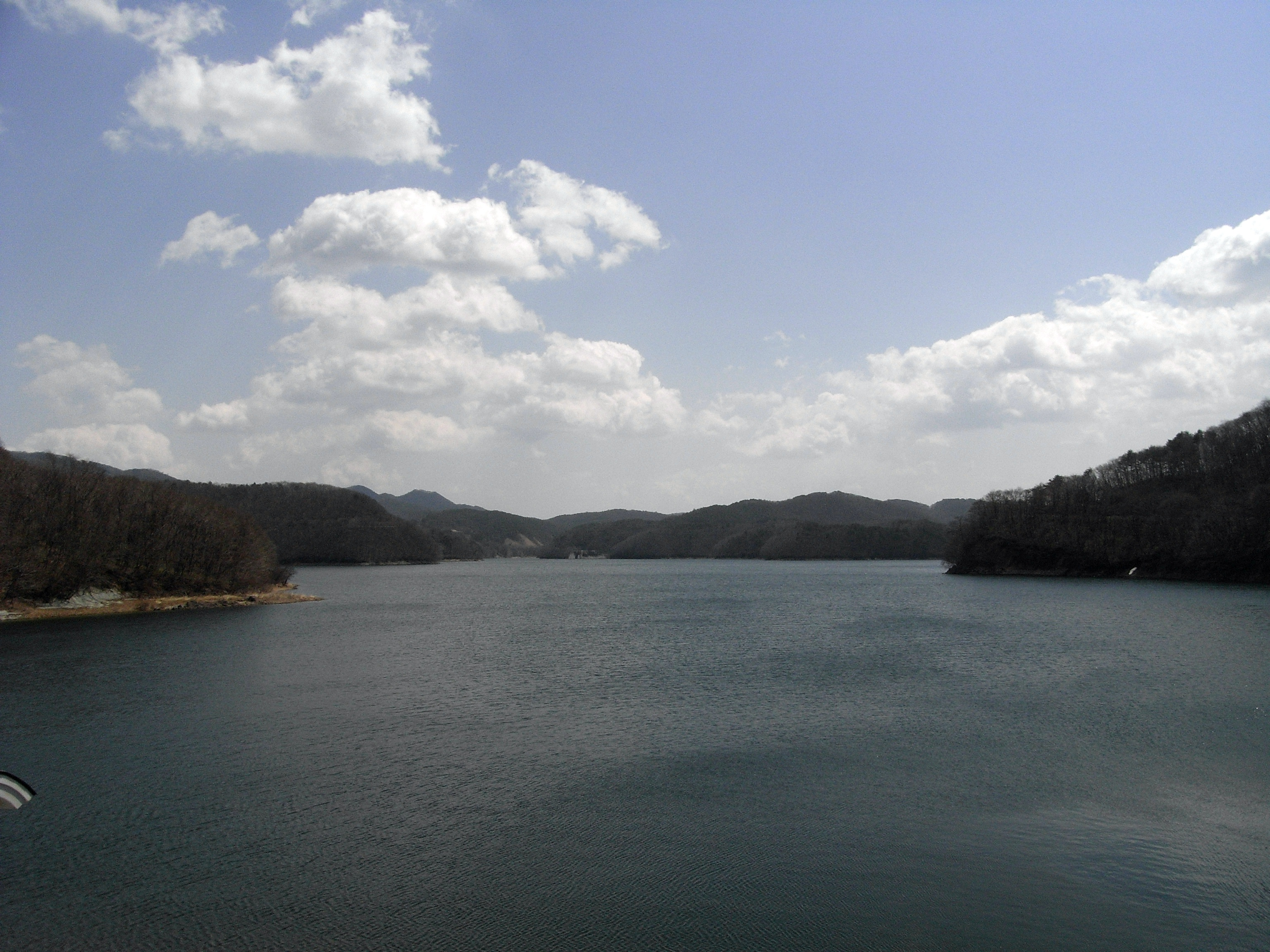
Lake Hatoriko

Ten-ei (天栄村, Ten-ei-mura) is a village located in Fukushima Prefecture, Japan. As of 1 January 2020, the village had an estimated population of 5,258 in 1717 households, and a population density of 23 persons per km^{2}. The total area of the village was 225.52 square kilometres (87.07 sq mi).

== Geography ==
Ten-ei is located in south-central Fukushima prefecture. The village spans the Pacific side of the Abukuma River watershed and the Sea of Japan side of the Agano River watershed across the Ou Mountains. Hatori Dam is located in the village, which supplies agricultural water to the Shirakawa area of the Abukuma River basin and golf courses, campgrounds, skiing around the reservoir. There are many of traditional hot springs in the village.

- Mountains: Futamatayama (1544 m)
- Rivers: Shakado River, Tsurunuma River

=== Neighboring municipalities ===
- Fukushima Prefecture
  - Aizuwakamatsu
  - Kagamiishi
  - Kōriyama
  - Nishigō
  - Shirakawa
  - Shimogō
  - Sukagawa
  - Yabuki

=== Climate ===
Ten-ei has a humid subtropical climate (Köppen climate classification Cfa). The average annual temperature in Ten-ei is 10.8 °C (51.4 °F). The average annual rainfall is 1,328 mm (52.3 in) with September as the wettest month. The temperatures are highest on average in August, at around 23.8 °C (74.8 °F), and lowest in January, at around −1.1 °C (30.0 °F).

Climate data for Yumoto, Ten-ei (1991−2020 normals, extremes 1988−present)
Month	Jan	Feb	Mar	Apr	May	Jun	Jul	Aug	Sep	Oct	Nov	Dec	Year
Record high °C (°F)	12.3 (54.1)	14.7 (58.5)	20.7 (69.3)	27.2 (81.0)	30.6 (87.1)	30.3 (86.5)	32.9 (91.2)	34.4 (93.9)	31.1 (88.0)	26.3 (79.3)	21.8 (71.2)	18.6 (65.5)	34.4 (93.9)
Mean daily maximum °C (°F)	1.4 (34.5)	2.4 (36.3)	6.4 (43.5)	13.7 (56.7)	19.2 (66.6)	21.9 (71.4)	25.4 (77.7)	26.5 (79.7)	22.1 (71.8)	16.5 (61.7)	10.9 (51.6)	4.6 (40.3)	14.3 (57.7)
Daily mean °C (°F)	−2.4 (27.7)	−2.0 (28.4)	1.2 (34.2)	7.2 (45.0)	12.7 (54.9)	16.6 (61.9)	20.5 (68.9)	21.3 (70.3)	17.2 (63.0)	11.2 (52.2)	5.2 (41.4)	0.2 (32.4)	9.1 (48.4)
Mean daily minimum °C (°F)	−6.6 (20.1)	−6.6 (20.1)	−3.4 (25.9)	1.1 (34.0)	6.3 (43.3)	11.9 (53.4)	16.7 (62.1)	17.4 (63.3)	13.3 (55.9)	6.6 (43.9)	0.2 (32.4)	−3.8 (25.2)	4.4 (40.0)
Record low °C (°F)	−18.7 (−1.7)	−18.3 (−0.9)	−17.0 (1.4)	−7.8 (18.0)	−2.8 (27.0)	0.4 (32.7)	6.2 (43.2)	8.4 (47.1)	−0.3 (31.5)	−4.7 (23.5)	−9.2 (15.4)	−15.9 (3.4)	−18.7 (−1.7)
Average precipitation mm (inches)	96.0 (3.78)	62.2 (2.45)	99.3 (3.91)	106.1 (4.18)	121.8 (4.80)	162.2 (6.39)	218.4 (8.60)	193.6 (7.62)	224.8 (8.85)	171.5 (6.75)	81.5 (3.21)	94.6 (3.72)	1,634.5 (64.35)
Average snowfall cm (inches)	195 (77)	159 (63)	128 (50)	15 (5.9)	0 (0)	0 (0)	0 (0)	0 (0)	0 (0)	0 (0)	10 (3.9)	118 (46)	610 (240)
Average precipitation days (≥ 1.0 mm)	16.1	12.9	13.3	11.0	11.3	13.7	15.6	13.8	13.1	11.2	11.4	14.8	158.2
Average snowy days (≥ 3 cm)	18.2	16.2	15.8	1.8	0	0	0	0	0	0	1.0	10.7	63.7
Mean monthly sunshine hours	78.9	104.2	153.5	180.7	194.2	143.8	140.4	166.8	125.7	126.6	107.8	84.1	1,606.5
Source: Japan Meteorological Agency

== Demographics ==
Per Japanese census data, the population of Ten-ei has declined over the past 70 years.

Historical population
Year	Pop.	±%
1950	10,590	—
1960	9,165	−13.5%
1970	7,324	−20.1%
1980	6,820	−6.9%
1990	6,964	+2.1%
2000	6,889	−1.1%
2010	6,291	−8.7%
2020	5,194	−17.4%

== History ==
The area of present-day Ten-ei was part of ancient Mutsu Province and formed part of the holdings of Shirakawa Domain during the Edo period. After the Meiji Restoration, it was organized as part of Iwase District in the Nakadōri region of Iwashiro Province. The villages of Makimoto, Yumoto, Oya and Hiroto were established on April 1, 1889, with the creation of the modern municipalities system. The village of Ten-ei was formed on March 31, 1955, with the merger of the villages of Makimoto, Yumoto, and a portion of Hiroto with the village of Osato.

Its population was above 10,000 in the 1950s, and this was the highest its population ever was.

Many of the houses in the village suffered severe damage from the 2011 Tohoku earthquake, after which Ten-ei has experienced accelerated population decline. Additional population losses before and after the earthquake were due to the community being far from key sites.

== Economy ==
In the 1950s the economy of Ten’ei was primarily made up of factories and agricultural operations. Ten-ei circa 2023 is majority agricultural, with Yacón a noteworthy crop.

== Education ==
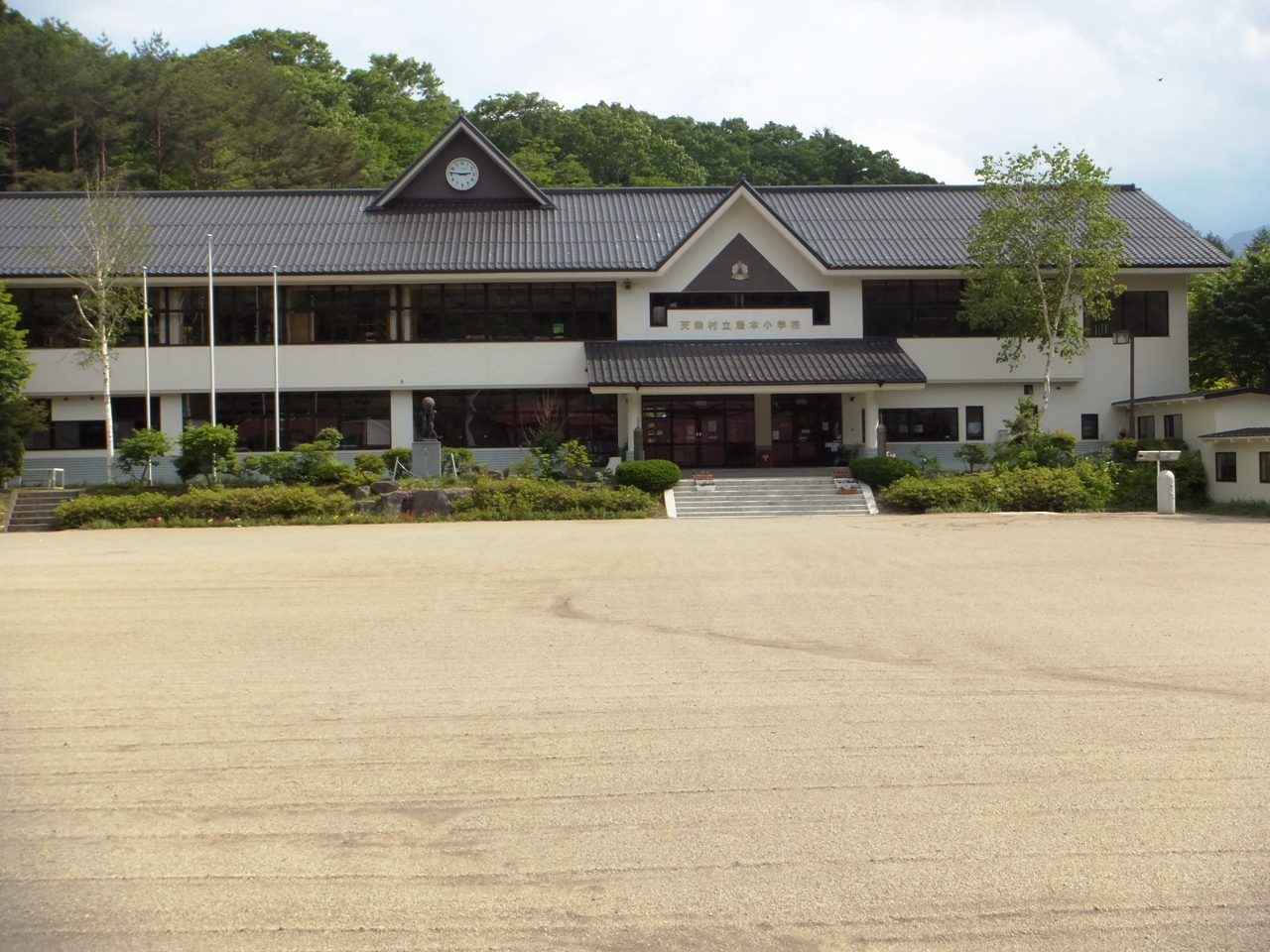
Yumoto Elementary School

Ten-ei has four public elementary schools and one public junior high school operated by the village government. The village does not have a high school.

Junior high schools:

- Ten-ei Junior High School (天栄村立天栄中学校)
- Yumoto Junior High School (天栄村立湯本中学校; closed in 2023) - The building was two stories tall. It began operations in 1947. Its peak population was in the 1960s. A sharp population decline occurred after 2000. Circa 2020 the population was five. The population loss resulted in it closing in 2023, with its final graduating class having two students.

Elementary schools:

- Hiroto Elementary School (天栄村立広戸小学校)
- Makimoto Elementary School (天栄村立牧本小学校)
- Osato Elementary School (天栄村立大里小学校)
- Yumoto Elementary School (天栄村立湯本小学校)

Kindergartens:

- Ten-ei Kindergarten (天栄幼稚園)
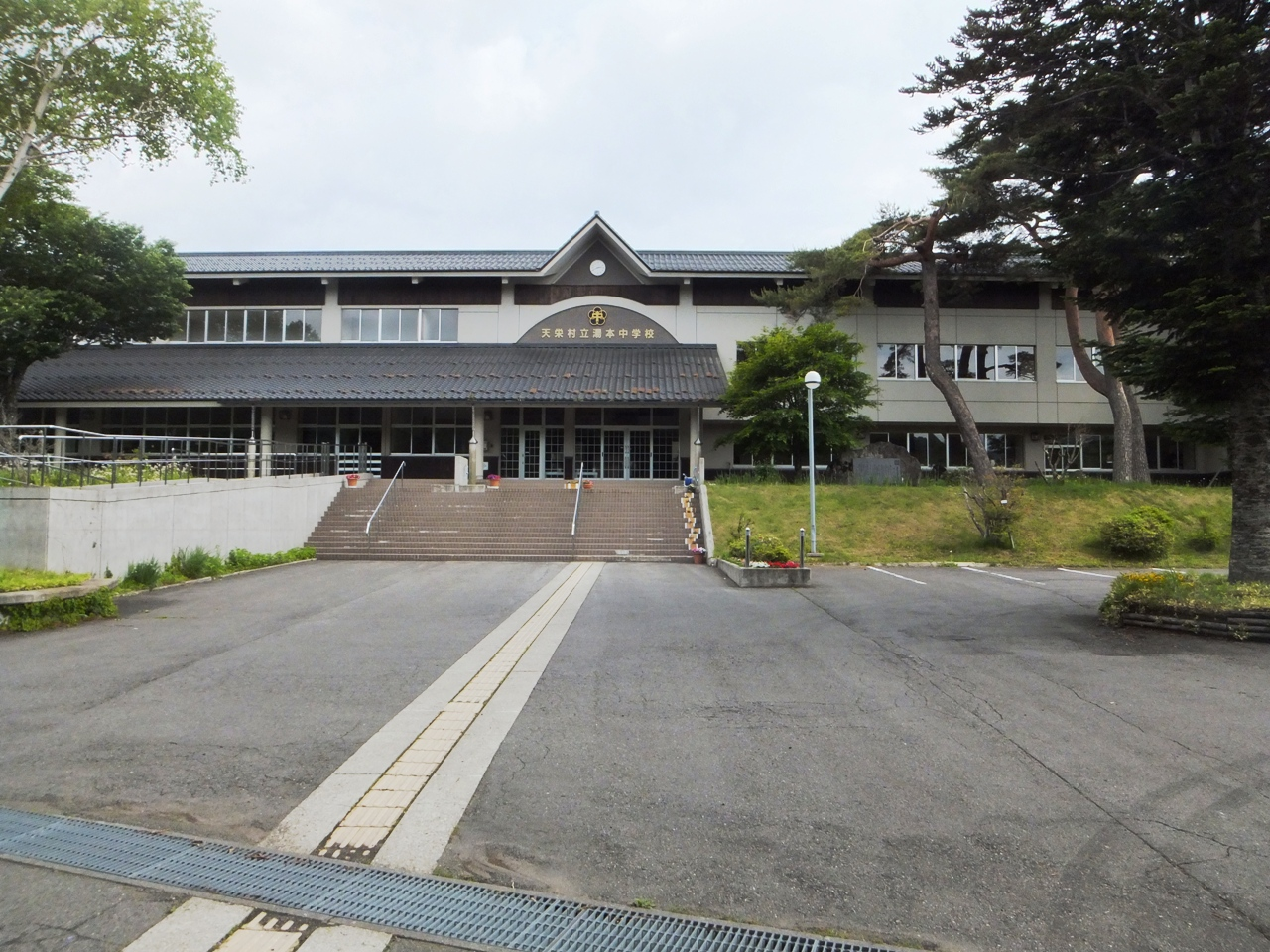
Yumoto Junior High School (closed 2023)

== Transportation ==
=== Railway ===
- Ten-ei does not have any passenger railway service.

Buses
No	Terminus	Via	Terminus	Company	Note
112	Sukagawa Station	Kagamiishi Station	Fumata Onsen	Fukushima Transportation	Runs only summer.
119	Shin-Shirakawa Station	Taishichoshamae(Gishu Nakayama Memorial Library)·Takabayashi	Maki-no-uchi	Fukushima Transportation	
113	Sukagawa Station	Kagamiishi Station	Naganuma koko	Fukushima Transportation	
114	Sukagawa Station	Kagamiishi Station	Ryusei	Fukushima Transportation	
115	Sukagawa Station	Kagamiishi Station	Maruyama Shako	Fukushima Transportation	
111	Sukagawa Station	Kagamiishi Station	Minamisawa	Fukushima Transportation	
1	Funahiki Station		Kodo/Kawauchi	Fukushima Transportation	
Yakon	Shin-Shirakawa Station	Saigo BS·Lake Hatori Kogenguchi·Iwase-Yumoto Onsen	Futamata Onsen	Fukushima Transportation	Runs only during winter. You must reserve the bus

=== Highway ===
- National Route 118

== Local attractions ==
- Futamata Hot Spring
- Hatori Dam
- Hatoriko Hot Spring and ski resort
- Ten’ei Hot Spring
- Yumoto Hot Spring
