= List of cities in Fukushima Prefecture by population =

The following list sorts all cities (including towns and villages) in the Japanese prefecture of Fukushima with a population of more than 10,000 according to the 2020 Census. As of October 1, 2020, 25 places fulfill this criterion and are listed here. This list refers only to the population of individual cities, towns and villages within their defined limits, which does not include other municipalities or suburban areas within urban agglomerations.

== List ==
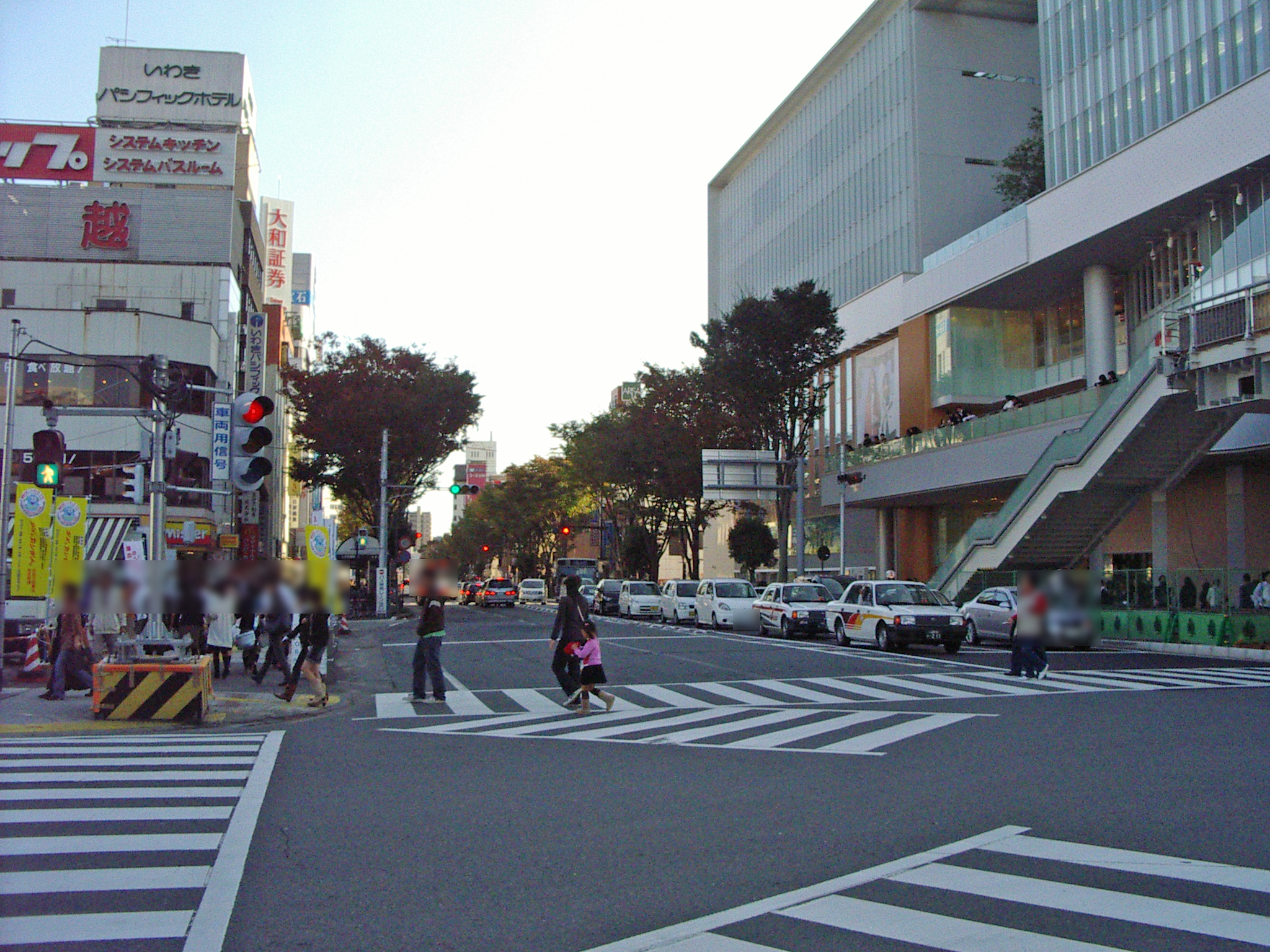
Iwaki

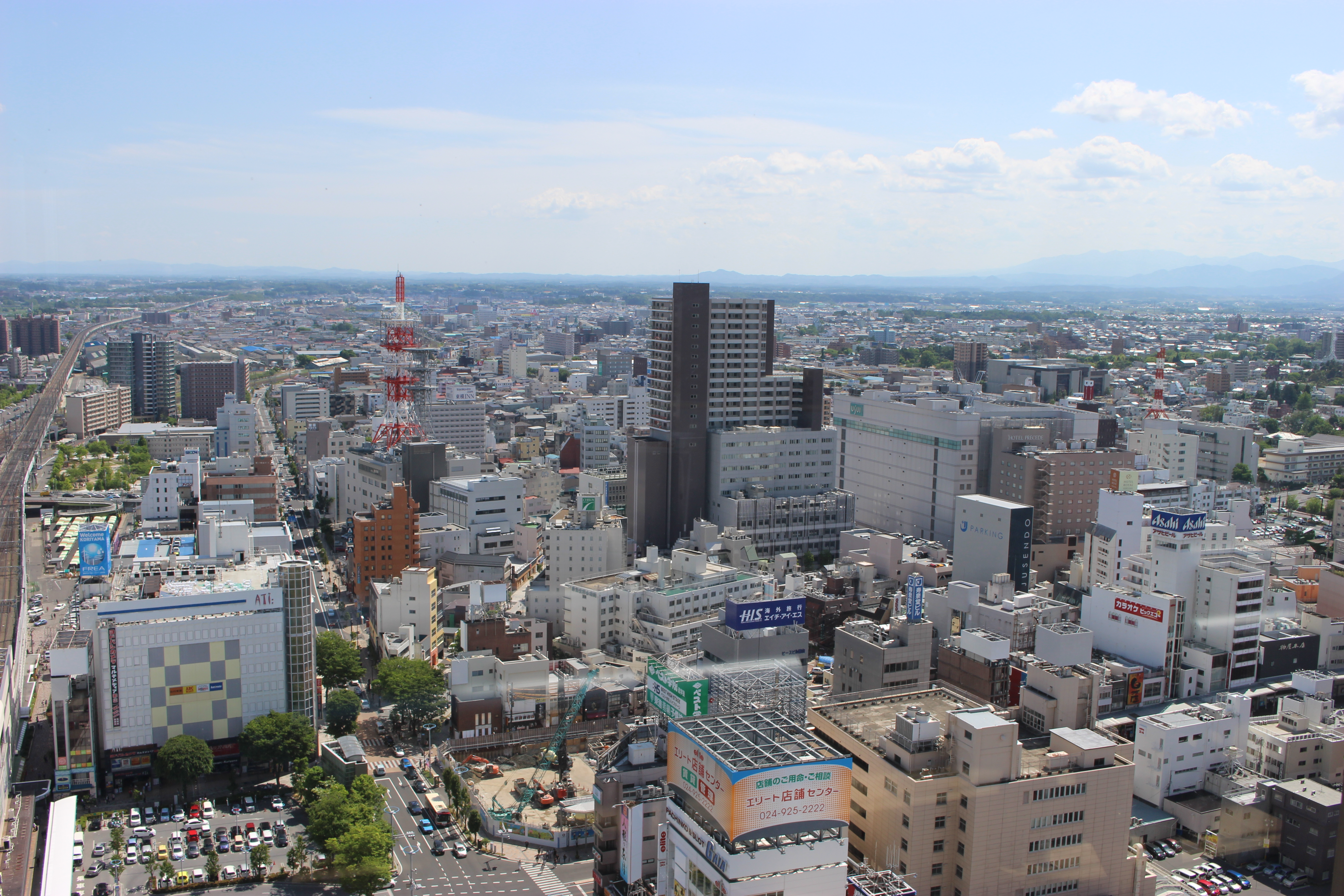
Kōriyama

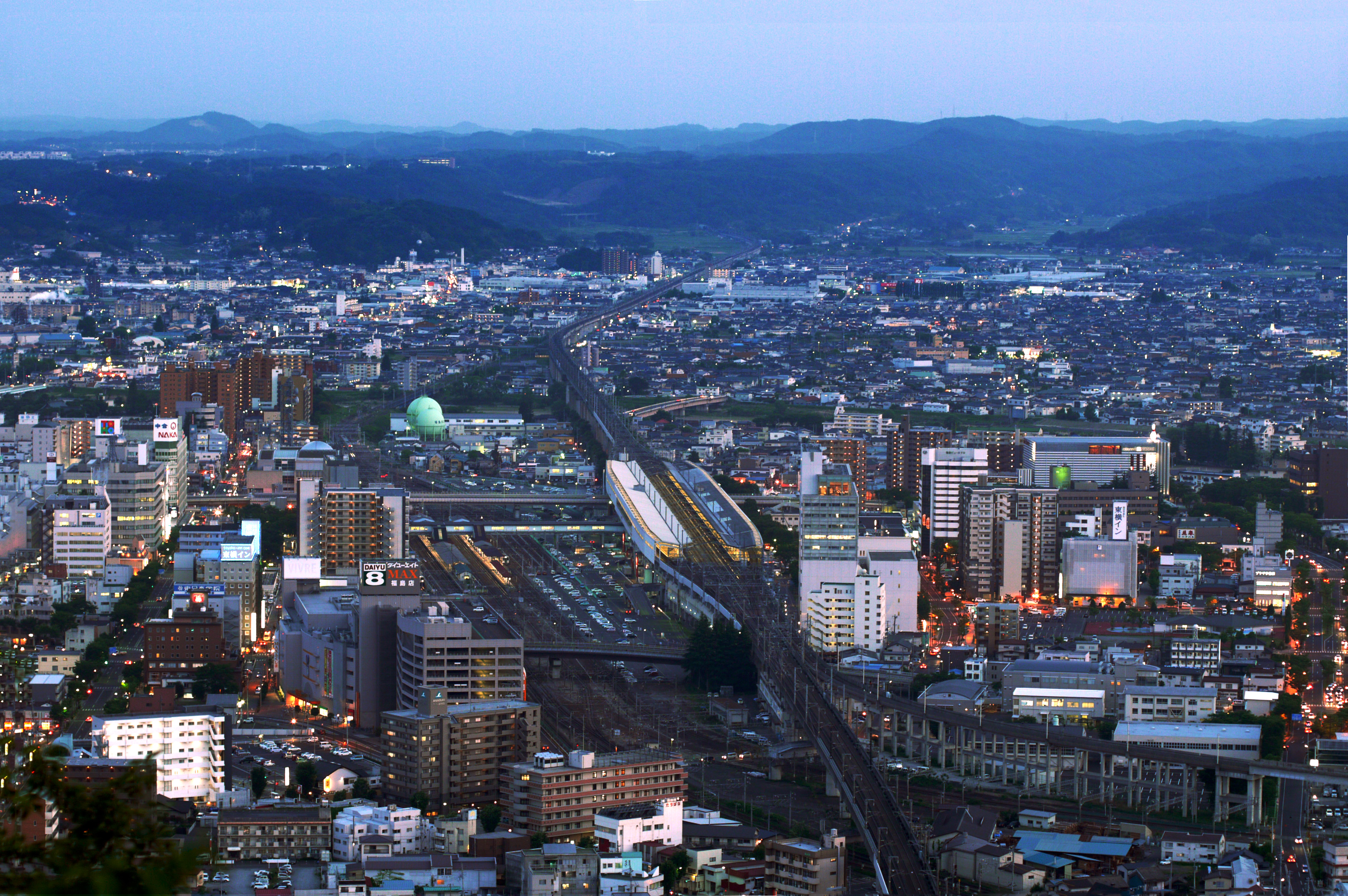
Fukushima

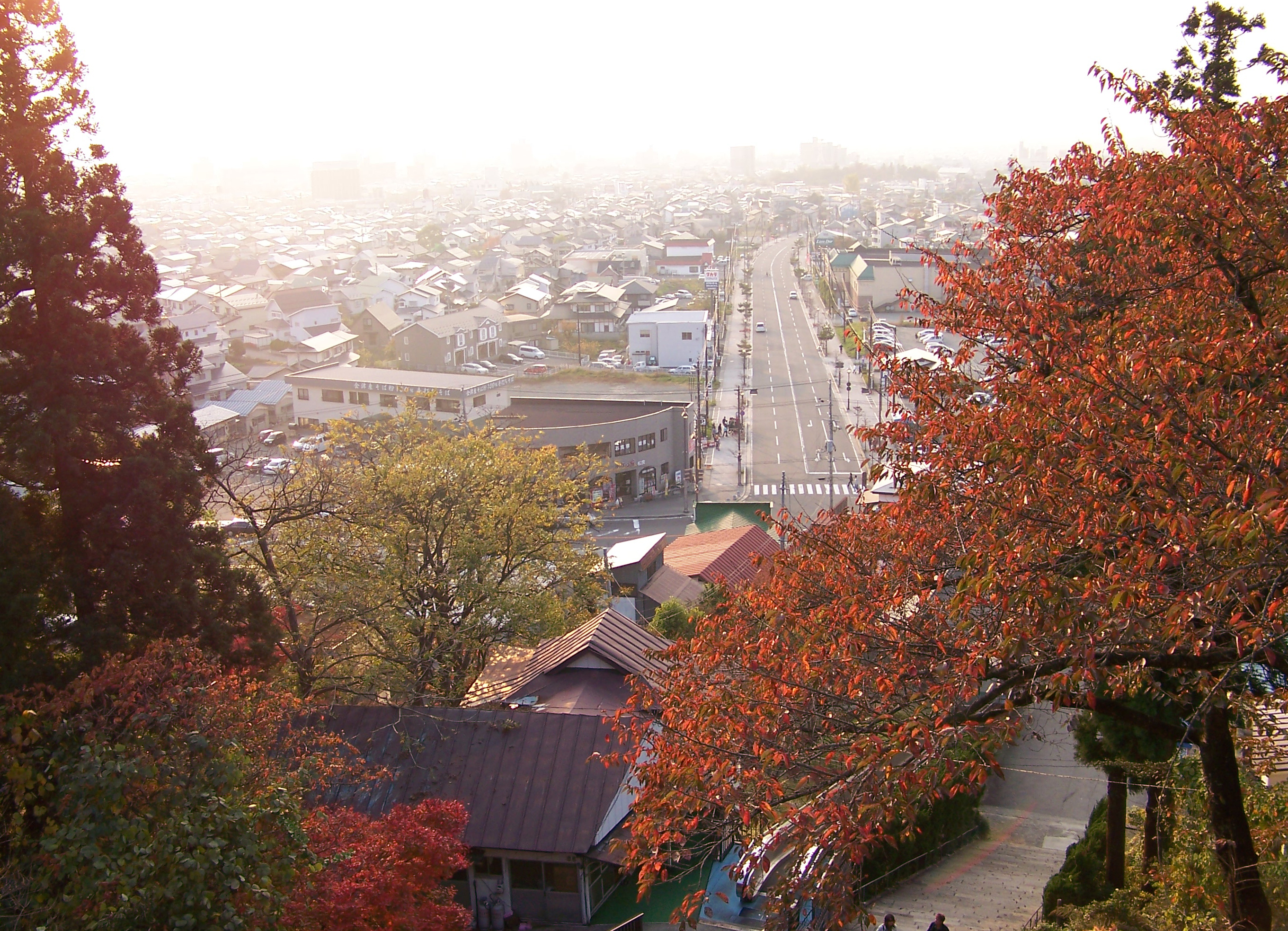
Aizuwakamatsu

The following table lists the 25 cities, villages and towns in Fukushima with a population of at least 10,000 on October 1, 2020, according to the 2020 Census. The table also gives an overview of the evolution of the population since the 1995 census.

Rank (2020)	Name	Status	2020	2015	2010	2005	2000	1995
1	Iwaki	City	333,202	350,237	342,249	354,492	360,138	360,598
2	Kōriyama	City	327,872	335,444	338,712	338,834	334,824	326,833
3	Fukushima	City	282,802	294,247	292,590	297,357	297,894	292,696
4	Aizuwakamatsu	City	117,433	124,062	126,220	131,389	135,415	137,065
5	Sukagawa	City	75,039	77,441	79,267	80,364	79,409	77,020
6	Shirakawa	City	59,531	61,913	64,704	65,707	66,048	65,155
7	Minamisōma	City	59,053	57,797	70,878	72,837	75,246	77,860
8	Date	City	58,250	62,400	66,027	69,289	71,817	73,305
9	Nihonmatsu	City	53,593	58,162	59,871	63,178	66,077	67,269
10	Kitakata	City	44,810	49,377	52,356	56,396	58,571	59,554
11	Tamura	City	35,192	38,503	40,422	43,253	45,052	46,129
12	Sōma	City	34,884	38,556	37,817	38,630	38,842	39,449
13	Motomiya	City	30,240	30,924	31,489	31,367	31,541	30,682
14	Nishigō	Village	20,809	20,322	19,767	19,494	18,642	17,920
15	Aizumisato	Town	19,030	20,913	22,737	24,741	26,172	27,039
16	Yabuki	Town	17,307	17,370	18,407	18,735	18,892	19,075
17	Miharu	Town	17,026	18,304	18,191	19,194	19,976	20,124
18	Aizubange	Town	15,068	16,303	17,360	18,274	19,426	20,083
19	Ishikawa	Town	14,655	15,880	17,775	18,921	19,914	21,026
20	Minamiaizu	Town	14,453	16,264	17,864	19,870	21,095	22,059
21	Inawashiro	Town	13,559	15,037	15,805	17,009	18,178	18,874
22	Tanagura	Town	13,330	14,295	15,062	15,795	16,376	16,547
23	Kagamiishi	Town	12,316	12,486	12,815	12,746	12,743	12,378
24	Kawamata	Town	12,186	14,452	15,569	17,034	17,751	19,043
25	Koori	Town	11,464	12,271	12,853	13,411	13,700	14,221
