= Hatori Dam =

Dam in Fukushima Prefecture, Japan

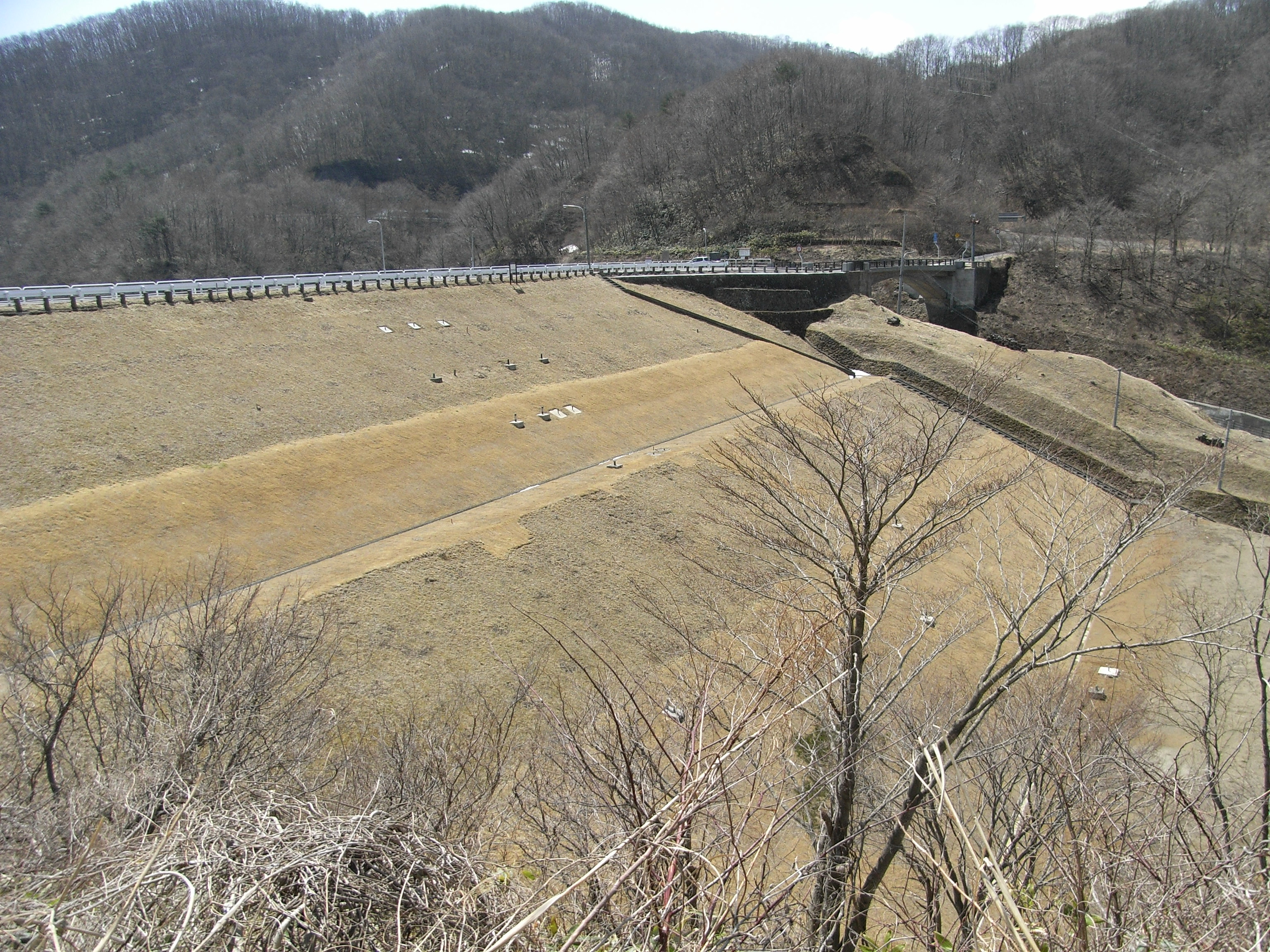
- Hatori Dam

- Location within Fukushima Prefecture Location within Japan
- Official name: 羽鳥ダム
- Location: Ten'ei, Fukushima, Japan
- Coordinates: 37°16′18″N 140°04′34″E
- Construction began: 1950
- Opening date: 1956

Dam and spillways
- Type of dam: earth-fill dam
- Impounds: Tsurunuma River
- Height: 37.1 m (122 ft)
- Length: 169.5 m (556 ft)

Reservoir
- Creates: Lake Hatori
- Total capacity: 27,321,000 m^{3}
- Catchment area: 42.7 km^{2}
- Surface area: 201 hectares

Hatori Dam (羽鳥ダム, Hatori damu) is a dam in Ten'ei, Fukushima Prefecture, Japan. Hatori Dam is managed directly by the Ministry of Agriculture, Forestry and Fisheries, and is intended to provide irrigation for the Shirakawa area of the Abukuma River Basin. The dam is an earth dam with a height of 37.1 meters. The reservoir created by the dam is called Lake Hatori, and has been developed as a resort area.

== History ==
The Abukuma River that flows through the Nakadori region of central Fukushima prefecture was traditionally a strong granary area, due to lack of water in areas not immediately adjacent to the Abukuma River, and due to the fact that the average flow rate of the Abukuma River itself is also small (52.07 tons per second). During the Edo period, even a light drought was enough to result in crop failure. For this reason, efforts were made to take water from the Agano River (called the "Aga River" in Fukushima) which has an abundant flow rate of about eight times (395.86 tons per second) that of the average flow rate of the Abukuma River. In the Meiji period, the Azumi Canal was completed in 1882 bring water to the area from Lake Inawashiro, and momentum began to promote use of the Agano River to open up new agricultural land. A government project started in 1941, which eventually resulted in the Hatori Dam.The project was suspended by World War II, but was revived in 1950, and the dam was completed in 1956. Water stored at the dam crosses the watershed of the Ōu Mountains via tunnel and is led to the Abukuma River. At the time, it was one of the largest irrigation dams in Japan. The irrigation network continued to be expanded through 1964.
