= Sukagawa Station =

Railway station in Sukagawa, Fukushima Prefecture, Japan

Sukagawa Station 須賀川駅
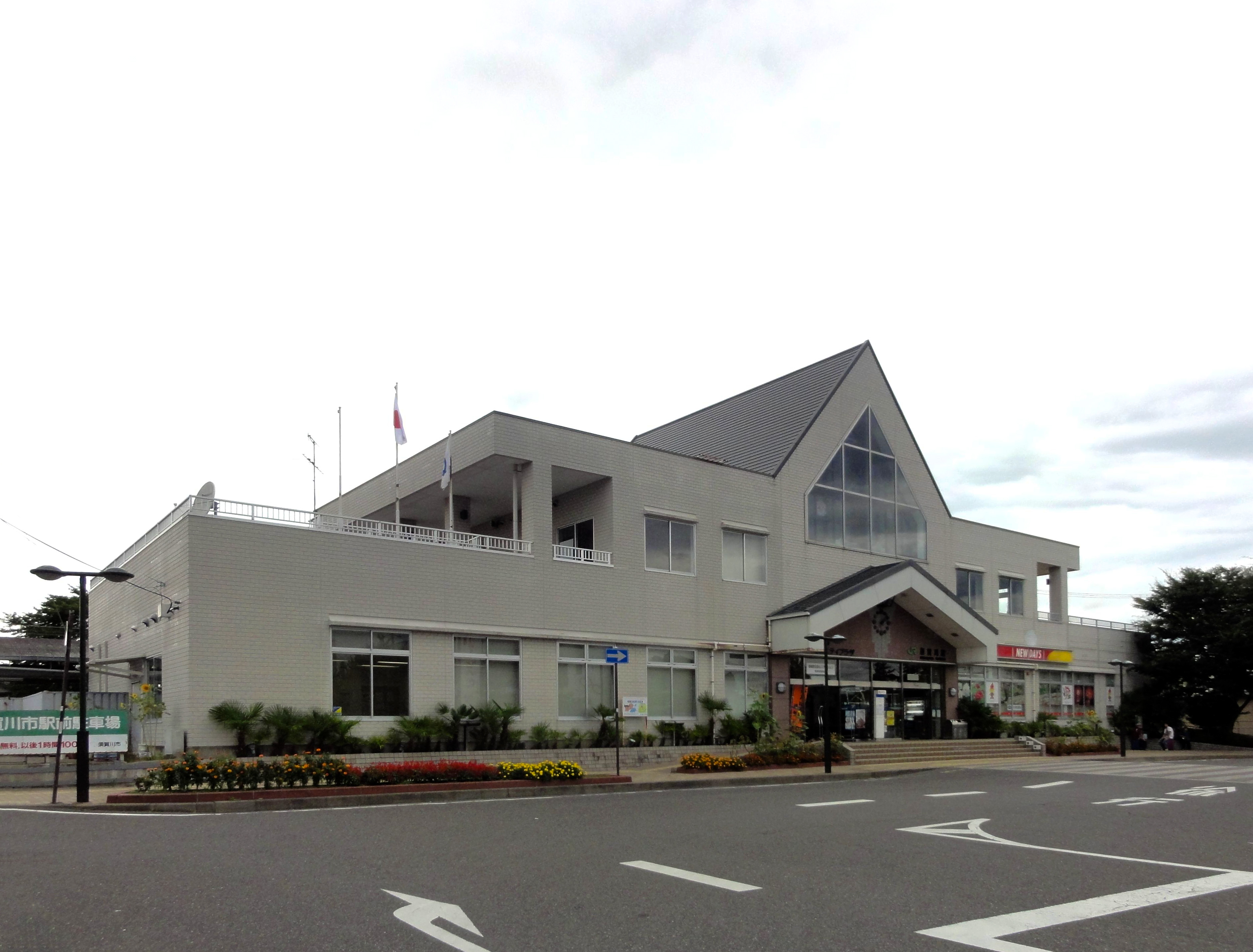
- Sukagawa Station in September 2012

General information
- Location: 63-1 Nakayama, Sukagawa-shi, Fukushima-ken 962-0004; Japan
- Coordinates: 37.3002°N 140.3724°E
- Operator: JR East
- Line: ■ Tōhoku Main Line
- Distance: 215.1 km from Tokyo
- Platforms: 2 side platforms
- Connections: Bus stop

Other information
- Status: Staffed (Midori no Madoguchi)
- Website: Official website

History
- Opened: July 16, 1887

Passengers
- FY2016: 2307 daily

Services
Preceding station	JR East	Following station
Kagamiishi towards Kuroiso	Tōhoku Main Line Local	Asaka-Nagamori towards Morioka
Location
- Location within Fukushima Prefecture Location within Japan

Sukagawa Station (須賀川駅, Sukagawa-eki) is a railway station in the city of Sukagawa, Fukushima Prefecture, Japan, operated by East Japan Railway Company (JR East).

== Overview ==
- This station is a representative station of Sukagawa City, and is the closest station to the city center, Midorigaoka Park, Sukagawa Botan Garden and Yoshimine Fuji Garden.

== Lines ==
Sukagawa Station is served by the Tōhoku Main Line, and is located 215.1 kilometers from the official starting point of the line at Tokyo Station.

== Station layout ==
The station has two opposed side platforms. The station has a Midori no Madoguchi staffed ticket office.

=== Platforms ===
1	■ Tōhoku Main Line	for Shin-Shirakawa and Kuroiso
2	■ Tōhoku Main Line	for Kōriyama and Fukushima

== Operation from at this station ==
- Upbound (for Yabuki, Shirakawa & Shin-Shirakawa)
  - During the day, one ordinary train (for Shin-Shirakawa) stops approximately every hour. Some trains also have Yabuki and Shirakawa lines. If you use the Kuroiso area from this station, you need to transfer at Shin-Shirakawa.
- Downhill (for Kōriyama, Motomiya & Fukushima)
  - During the day, as in the case of climbing, one ordinary train (bound for Koriyama) stops approximately every hour. Some trains are also set up for Fukushima north of Koriyama and for Sendai.

== History ==
Sukagawa Station opened on July 16, 1887. The station was absorbed into the JR East network upon the privatization of the Japanese National Railways (JNR) on April 1, 1987.

== Passenger statistics ==
In fiscal 2018, the station was used by an average of 2,294 passengers daily (boarding passengers only).

== Surrounding area ==
- Sukagawa City Hall
- National Route 4
- National Route 118
- Sukagawa Post Office
- Abukuma River

== See also ==
- List of railway stations in Japan
