= Yabuki, Fukushima =

Yabuki 矢吹町
- Town
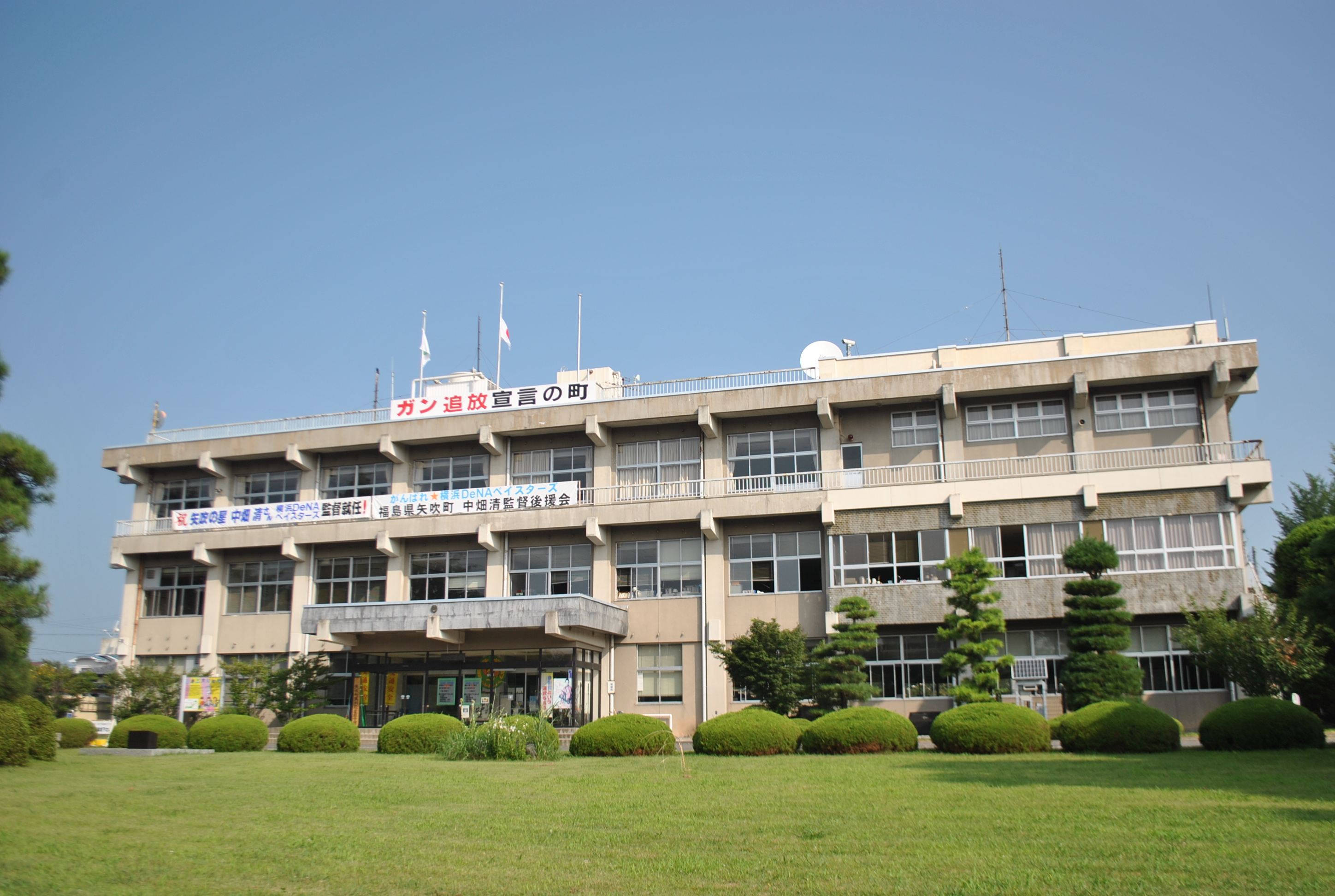
- Yabuki Town Hall

- Flag Seal

- Location of Yabuki in Fukushima Prefecture

- Coordinates: 37°12′4.6″N 140°20′18.8″E
- Country: Japan
- Region: Tōhoku
- Prefecture: Fukushima
- District: Nishishirakawa

Area
  - Total: 60.40 km^{2} (23.32 sq mi)

Population (February 2020)
  - Total: 16,955
  - Density: 280.7/km^{2} (727.0/sq mi)
- Time zone: UTC+9 (Japan Standard Time)
- Tree: Pinus densiflora
- Flower: Cymbidium goeringii
- Phone number: 0248-42-2111
- Address: 101 Ippongi Fujinuma, Yabuki-machi, Nishishirakawa-gun, Fukushima-ken 969-0236
- Website: Official website

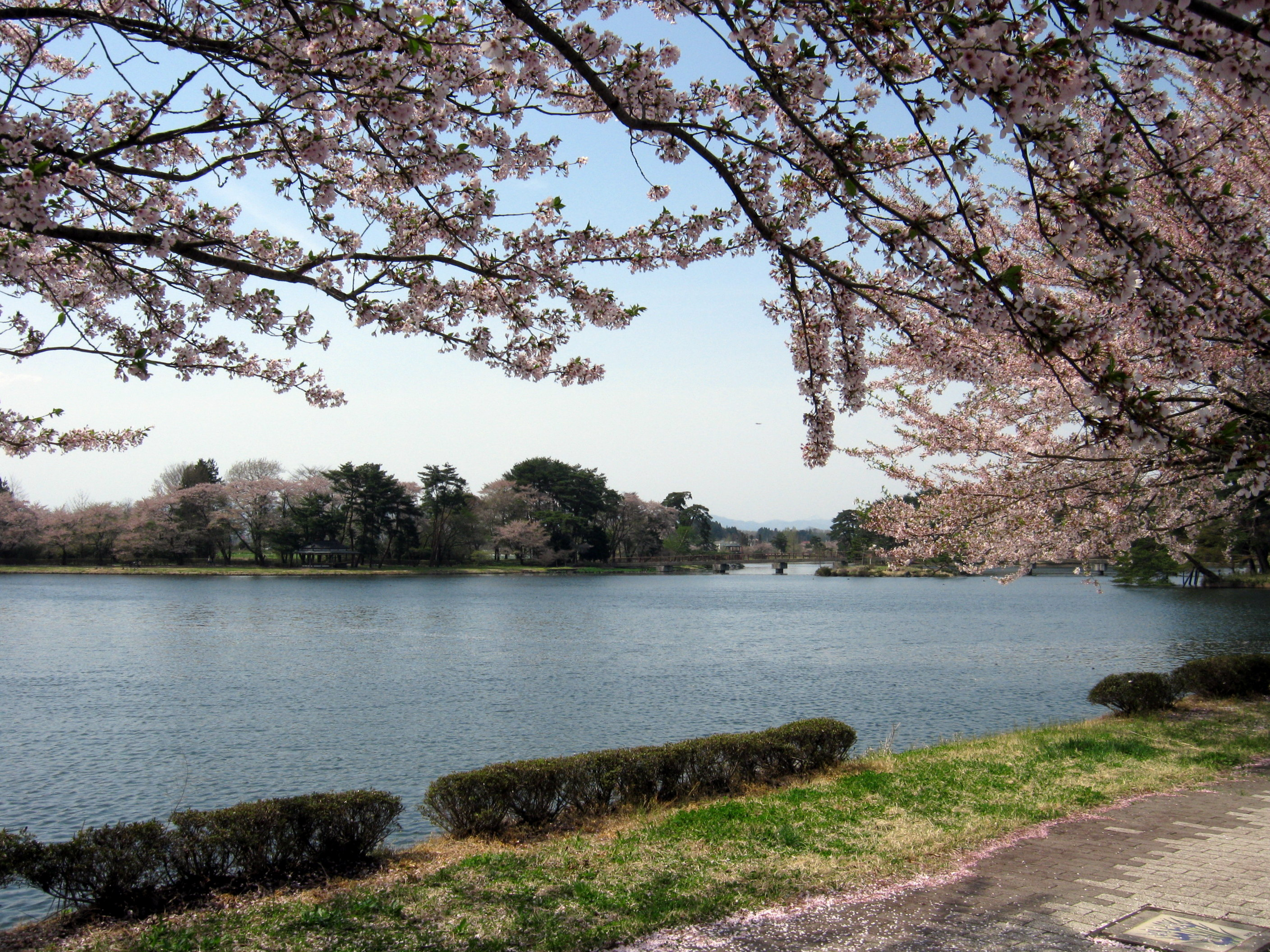
Oike Park in Yabuki

Yabuki (矢吹町, Yabuki-machi) is a town located in Fukushima Prefecture, Japan. As of 1 February 2020, the town had an estimated population of 16,955 in 6051 households, and a population density of 280 persons per km^{2}. The total area of the town was 60.4 square kilometres (23.3 sq mi).

== Geography ==
Yabuki is located in the flatlands of south-central Fukushima prefecture, approximately 212 kilometers north of Tokyo.

- Rivers: Abukuma River

=== Neighboring municipalities ===
- Fukushima Prefecture
  - Ishikawa
  - Izumizaki
  - Kagamiishi
  - Nakajima
  - Shirakawa
  - Tamakawa
  - Ten-ei

== Demographics ==
Per Japanese census data, the population of Yabuki has remained relatively stable over the past 40 years.

Historical population
Year	Pop.	±%
1950	15,531	—
1960	16,199	+4.3%
1970	15,666	−3.3%
1980	17,578	+12.2%
1990	18,642	+6.1%
2000	18,892	+1.3%
2010	18,407	−2.6%
2020	17,287	−6.1%

== Climate ==
Yabuki has a humid subtropical climate (Köppen climate classification Cfa). The average annual temperature in Yabuki is 11.7 °C (53.1 °F). The average annual rainfall is 1,312 mm (51.7 in) with September as the wettest month. The temperatures are highest on average in August, at around 24.2 °C (75.6 °F), and lowest in January, at around 0.32 °C (32.58 °F).

== History ==
The area of present-day Yabuki was part of ancient Mutsu Province and the area has many burial mounds from the Kofun period. The area formed part of the holdings of Shirakawa Domain during the Edo period, and had a number of post stations on the Mito Kaidō and the Ōshū Kaidō. After the Meiji Restoration, it was organized as part of Nishishirakawa District in the Nakadōri region of Iwaki Province.

Yabuki Village was formed on April 1, 1889, with the creation of the modern municipalities system. It was elevated to town status on December 1, 1903. The Imperial Japanese Army established an airfield in Yabuki in 1928, which became a major pilot training base in 1937. It was bombed by American forces in August 1945 during World War II.

During the 2011 Tohoku earthquake, over 1800 structures were severely damaged or destroyed, corresponding to approximately 30 percent of the town, the largest percentage of any municipality not affected by a tsunami.

== Economy ==
The economy of Yabuki is primarily agricultural.

== Education ==
Yabuki has four public elementary schools and one public junior high school operated by the town government. There is one public high school operated by the Fukushima Prefectural Board of Education.

- Yabuki Middle School
- Fukushima Prefectural Konan-Minami High School

== Transportation ==
=== Railway ===
JR East – Tōhoku Main Line

- Yabuki

=== Highway ===
- Tōhoku Expressway
- Abukuma Kōgen Road
- National Route 4

== Local attractions ==
- Ayuri Hot Springs

== Noted people from Yabuki ==
- Asami Chiba, runner
- Kiyoshi Nakahata, baseball player
