= Kagamiishi Station =

Railway station in Kagamiishi, Fukushima Prefecture, Japan

Kagamiishi Station 鏡石駅
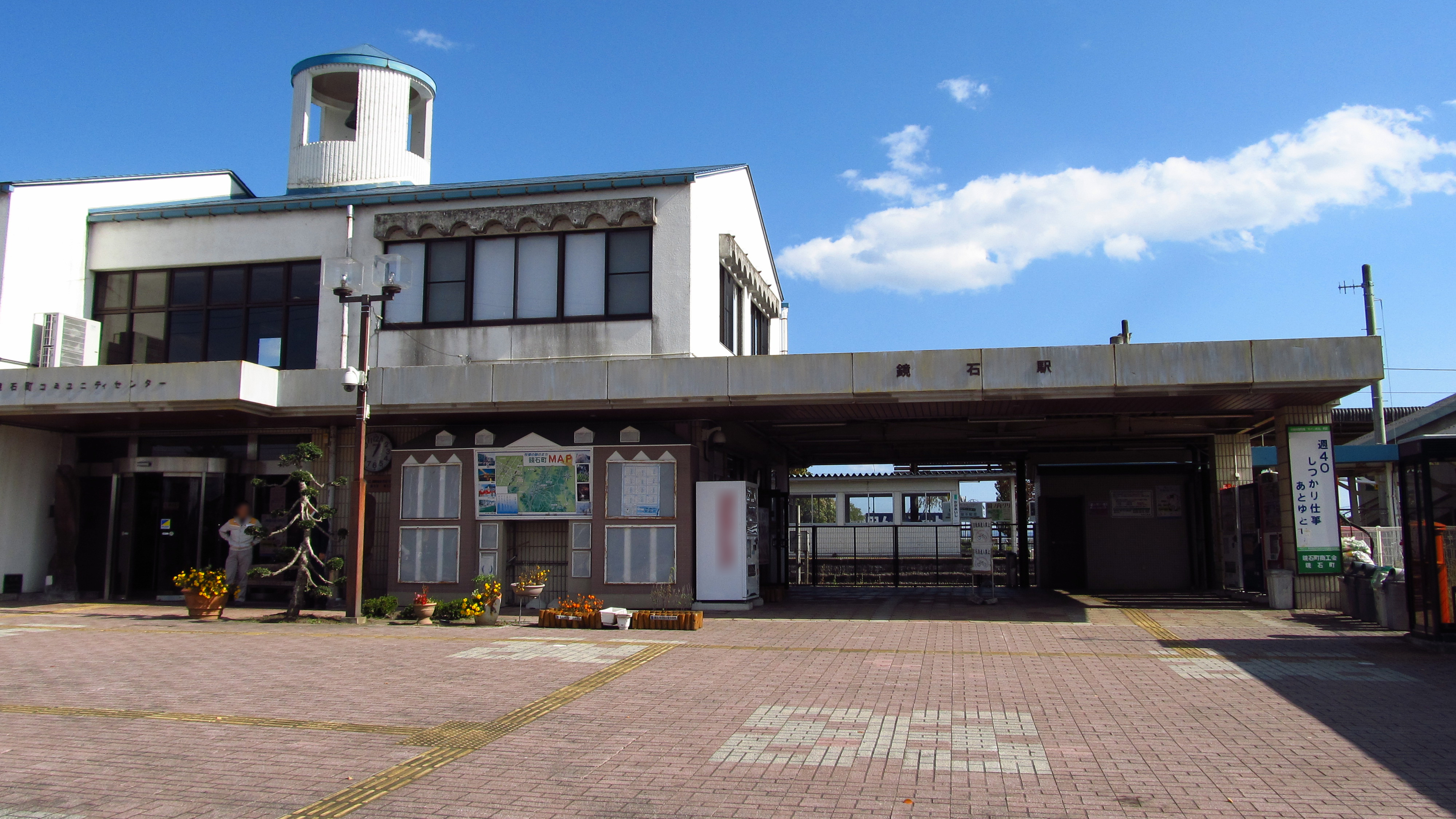
- Kagamiishi Station in October 2015

General information
- Location: Chuo-245, Kagamiishi-machi, Iwase-gun, Fukushima-ken 969-0404; Japan
- Coordinates: 37.2505°N 140.3469°E
- Operator: JR East
- Line: ■ Tōhoku Main Line
- Distance: 208.8 km from Tokyo
- Platforms: 1 island platform
- Tracks: 2
- Connections: Bus stop

Other information
- Status: Staffed
- Website: Official website

History
- Opened: June 25, 1911

Passengers
- FY2018: 874 daily

Services
Preceding station	JR East	Following station
Yabuki towards Kuroiso	Tōhoku Main Line Local	Sukagawa towards Morioka
Location
- Location within Fukushima Prefecture Location within Japan

Kagamiishi Station (鏡石駅, Kagamiishi-eki) is a railway station in the town of Kagamiishi, Fukushima Prefecture, Japan operated by East Japan Railway Company (JR East).

== Lines ==
Kagamiishi Station is served by the Tōhoku Main Line, and is located 208.8 rail kilometers from the official starting point of the line at Tokyo Station.

== Station layout ==
The station has one island platform. The station is staffed.

=== Platforms ===
1	■ Tōhoku Main Line	for Kōriyama and Fukushima
2	■ Tōhoku Main Line	for Shin-Shirakawa, and Kuroiso

== History ==
Kagamiishi Station opened on June 25, 1911. The station was absorbed into the JR East network upon the privatization of the Japanese National Railways (JNR) on April 1, 1987.

== Passenger statistics ==
In fiscal 2018, the station was used by an average of 874 passengers daily (boarding passengers only).

== Surrounding area ==
- Kagamiishi Town Hall
- National Route 4
- Kagamiishi Post Office
- Kagamiishi Industrial Park

== See also ==
- List of railway stations in Japan
