= Yabuki Station =

Railway station in Yabuki, Fukushima Prefecture, Japan

Yabuki Station 矢吹駅
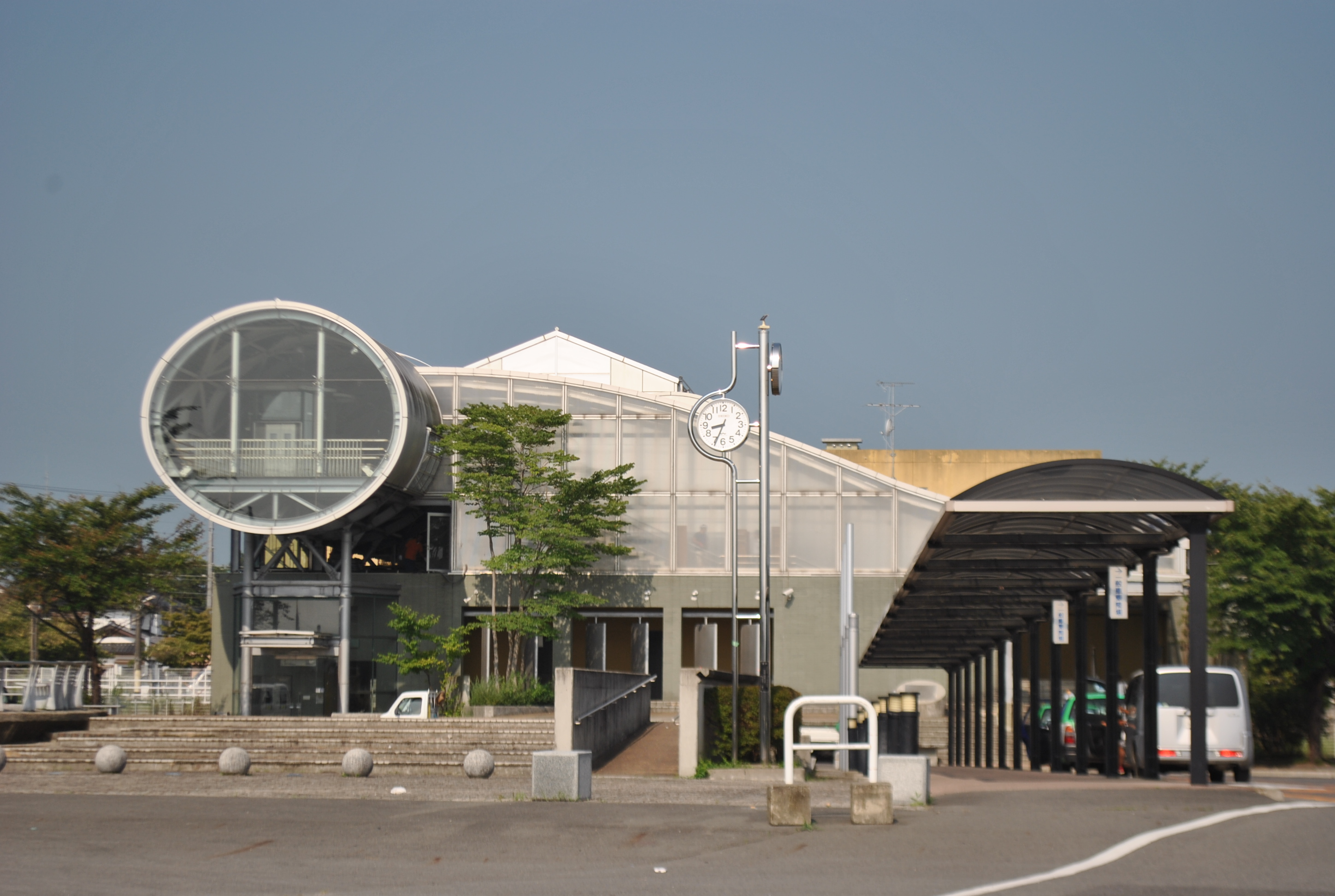
- Yabuki Station in August 2013

General information
- Location: Nakamachi 235-4, Yabuki-machi, Nishishirakawa-gun, Fukushima-ken 969-0221; Japan
- Coordinates: 37.2054°N 140.3277°E
- Operator: JR East
- Line: ■ Tōhoku Main Line
- Distance: 203.4 km from Tokyo
- Platforms: 1 island platform
- Tracks: 2
- Connections: Bus stop

Other information
- Status: Staffed (Midori no Madoguchi)
- Website: Official website

History
- Opened: July 16, 1887

Passengers
- FY2018: 1066 daily

Services
Preceding station	JR East	Following station
Izumizaki towards Kuroiso	Tōhoku Main Line Local	Kagamiishi towards Morioka
Location
- Location within Fukushima Prefecture Location within Japan

Yabuki Station (矢吹駅, Yabuki-eki) is a railway station in the town of Yabuki, Fukushima Prefecture, Japan operated by East Japan Railway Company (JR East).

== Lines ==
Yabuki Station is served by the Tōhoku Main Line, and is located 203.4 rail kilometers from the official starting point of the line at Tokyo Station.

== Station layout ==
The station has one island platform and two opposed side platforms connected to the station building by a footbridge. The station has a Midori no Madoguchi staffed ticket office.

=== Platforms ===
1	■ Tōhoku Main Line	for Kōriyama and Fukushima
2	■ Tōhoku Main Line	for Kōriyama and Fukushima (starting trains) for Shirakawa, and Kuroiso
3	■ Tōhoku Main Line	for Shirakawa and Kuroiso

== History ==
Yabuki Station opened on July 16, 1887. The station was absorbed into the JR East network upon the privatization of the Japanese National Railways (JNR) on April 1, 1987. A new station building was completed in October 1995.

== Passenger statistics ==
In fiscal 2018, the station was used by an average of 1066 passengers daily (boarding passengers only).

== Surrounding area ==
- Yabuki Town Hall
- National Route 4
- Yabuki Post Office
- Yabuki Culture Center

== See also ==
- List of railway stations in Japan
