= Kagamiishi, Fukushima =

Kagamiishi 鏡石町
- Town
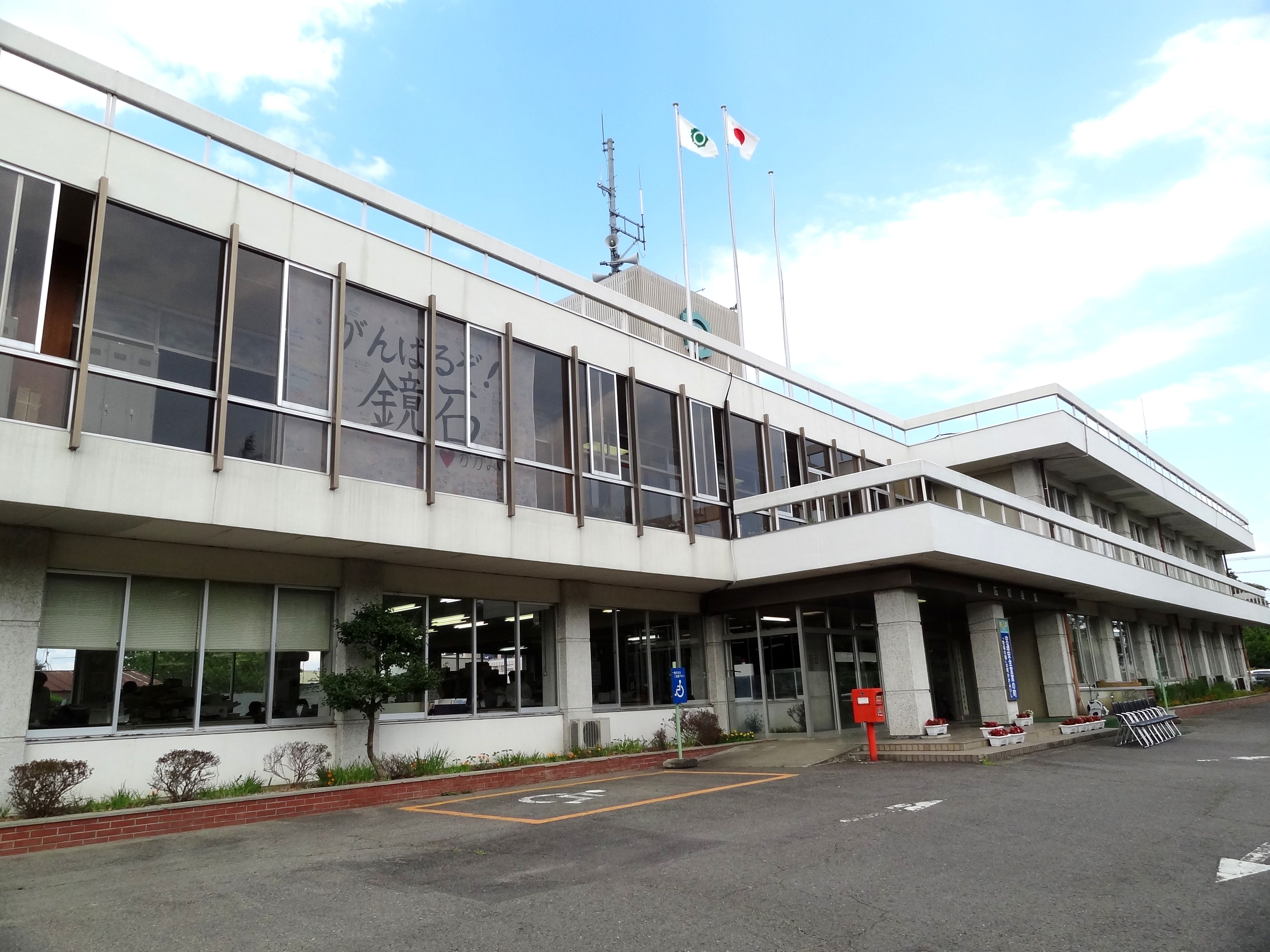
- Kagamiishi Town Hall

- Flag Seal

- Location of Kagamiishi in Fukushima Prefecture

- Coordinates: 37°15′10.2″N 140°20′36.1″E
- Country: Japan
- Region: Tōhoku
- Prefecture: Fukushima
- District: Iwase

Area
  - Total: 31.30 km^{2} (12.08 sq mi)

Population (March 2020)
  - Total: 12,272
  - Density: 392.1/km^{2} (1,015/sq mi)
- Time zone: UTC+9 (Japan Standard Time)
- Tree: Sakura
- Flower: Iris sibirica
- Phone number: 0248-62-2111
- Address: 345 Fujinuma, Kagamiishi-machi, Iwase-gun, Fukushima-ken 969-0492
- Website: Official website

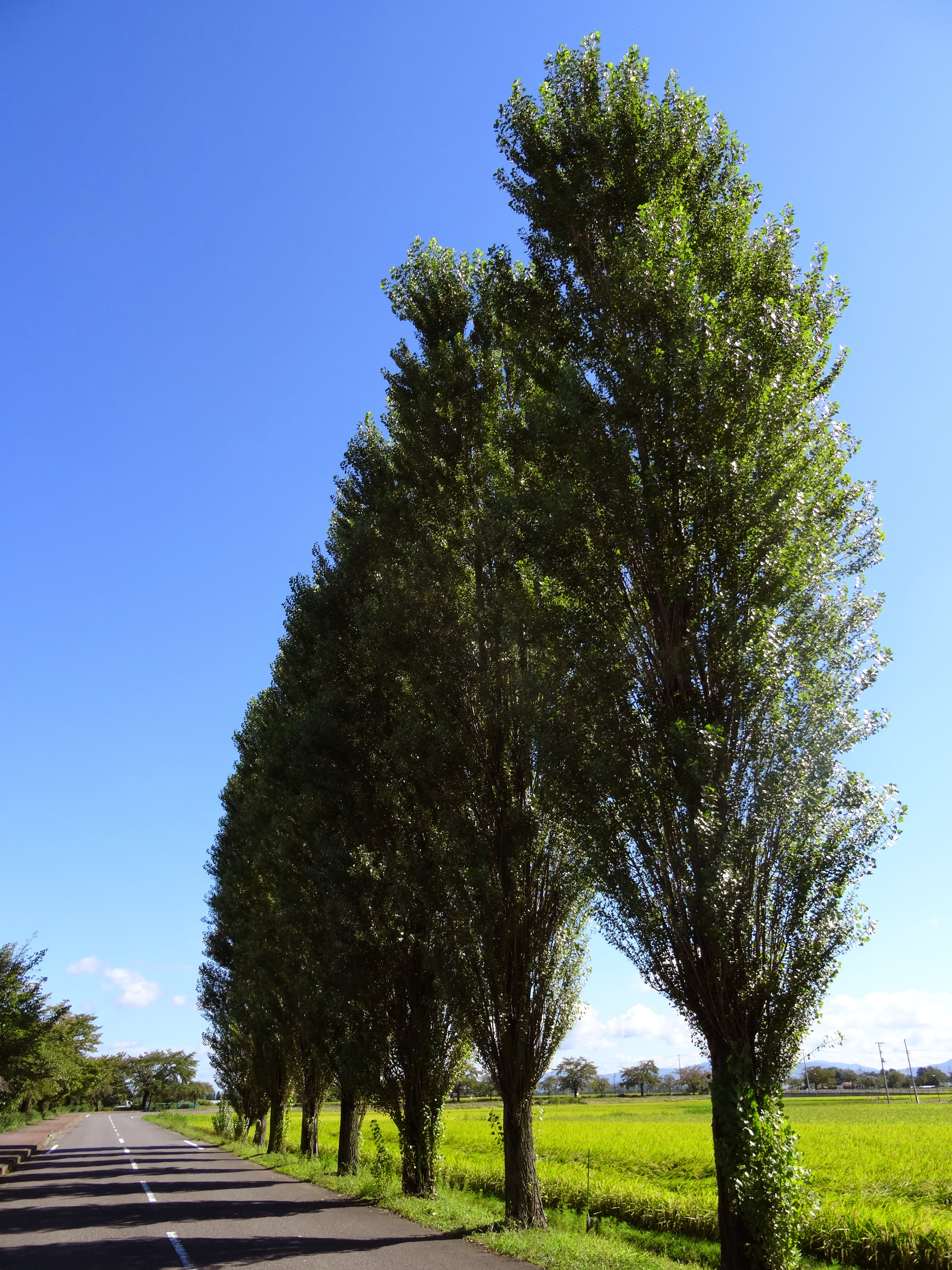
Midorimachi in Kagamiishi

Kagamiishi (鏡石町, Kagamiishi-machi) is a town located in Fukushima Prefecture, Japan. As of 1 March 2020, the town had an estimated population of 12,272 in 4434 households, and a population density of 390 persons per km^{2}. The total area of the town was 31.30 square kilometres (12.08 sq mi).

== Geography ==
Kagamiishi is located on a plateau with an average elevation of 280 meters in south-central Fukushima prefecture, bordered by the Shakado River to the west and the Abukuma River to the east.

=== Neighboring municipalities ===
- Fukushima Prefecture
  - Sukagawa
  - Tamakawa
  - Ten'ei
  - Yabuki

=== Climate ===
Kagamiishi has a humid subtropical climate (Köppen climate classification Cfa). The average annual temperature in Kagamiishi is 11.8 °C (53.2 °F). The average annual rainfall is 1,286 mm (50.6 in) with September as the wettest month. The temperatures are highest on average in August, at around 24.5 °C (76.1 °F), and lowest in January, at around 0.2 °C (32.4 °F).

== Demographics ==
Per Japanese census data, the population of Kagamiishi has plateaued after a long period of growth.

Historical population
Year	Pop.	±%
1920	3,970	—
1930	4,611	+16.1%
1940	5,019	+8.8%
1950	8,246	+64.3%
1960	8,694	+5.4%
1970	9,278	+6.7%
1980	11,437	+23.3%
1990	12,130	+6.1%
2000	12,743	+5.1%
2010	12,815	+0.6%
2020	12,318	−3.9%

== History ==
The area of present-day Kagamiishi was part of ancient Mutsu Province and formed part of the holdings of Shirakawa Domain during the Edo period. After the Meiji Restoration, it was organized as part of Iwase District in the Nakadōri region of Iwashiro Province. Kagamiishi Village was formed on April 1, 1889, with the creation of the modern municipalities system. It was elevated to town status on August 1, 1962. During the 2011 Tohoku earthquake, over 1000 structures were severely damaged or destroyed, corresponding to approximately 23 percent of the town.

== Economy ==
The economy of Kagamiishi is primarily agricultural.

== Education ==
Kagamiishi has two public elementary schools and one public junior high school operated by the town government. The town has one public high school operated by the Fukushima Prefectural Board of Education.

- Kagamiishi Middle School
- Fukushima Prefectural Iwase Agricultural High School

== Transportation ==
=== Railway ===
JR East – Tōhoku Main Line

- Kagamiishi

=== Highway ===
- Tōhoku Expressway
- National Route 4
- National Route 118

== Local attractions ==
- Iwase Farm
