= Nukada Station =

Railway station in Naka, Ibaraki prefecture, Japan

Nukada Station 額田駅
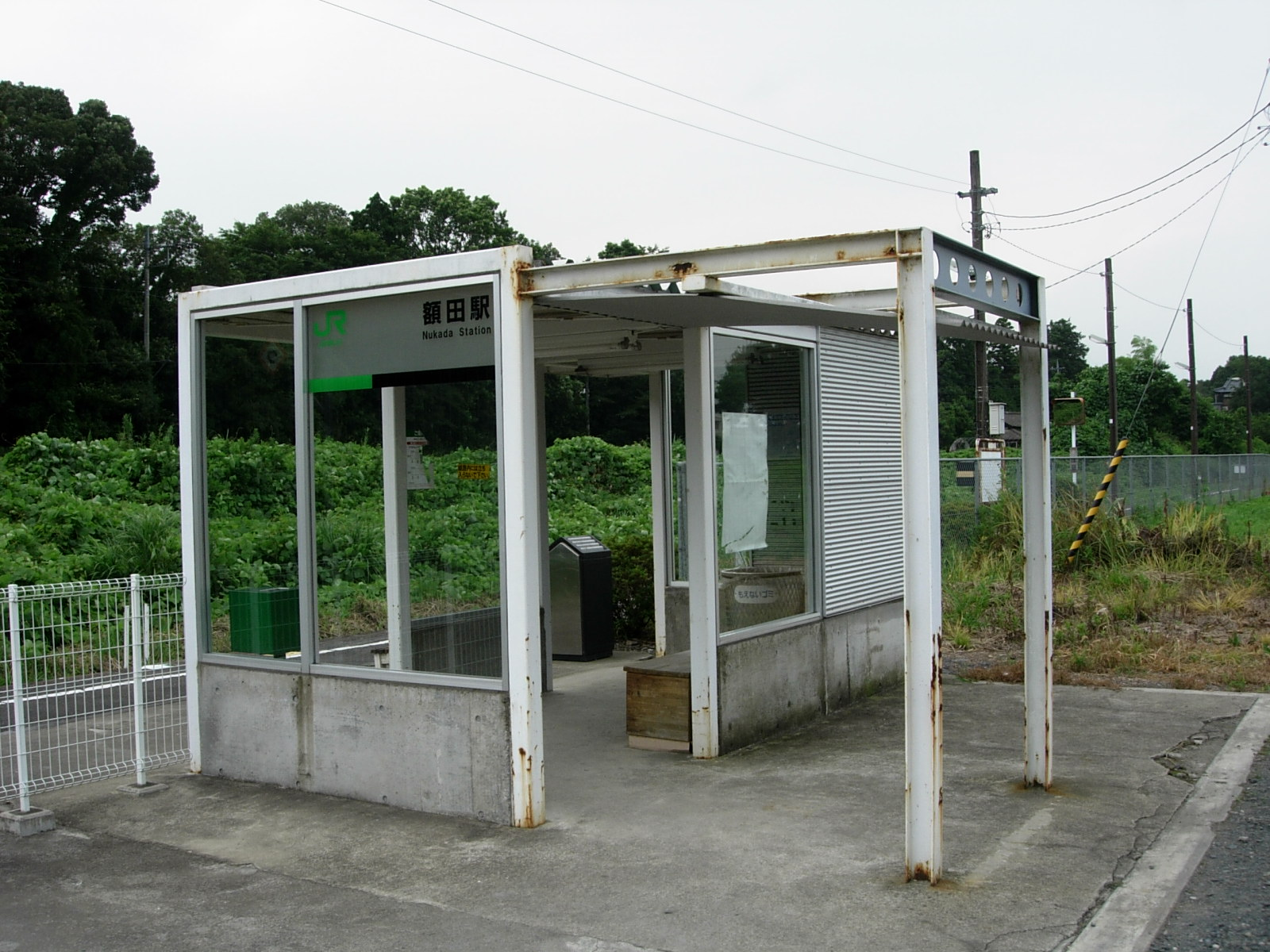
- Nukada Station in August 2004

General information
- Location: Nukada Minami-go Tenjin Koya 1205-2, Naka-shi, Ibaraki-ken 311-0107; Japan
- Coordinates: 36°29′09″N 140°30′12″E
- Operator: JR East
- Line: ■ Suigun Line
- Distance: 3.6 km from Kami-Sugaya
- Platforms: 1 side platform

Other information
- Status: Unstaffed
- Website: Official website

History
- Opened: November 16, 1897

Services
Preceding station	JR East	Following station
Minami-Sakaide towards Mito	Suigun Line Hitachi-Ōta Branch	Kawai towards Hitachi-Ōta
Location
- Location within Ibaraki Prefecture Location within Japan

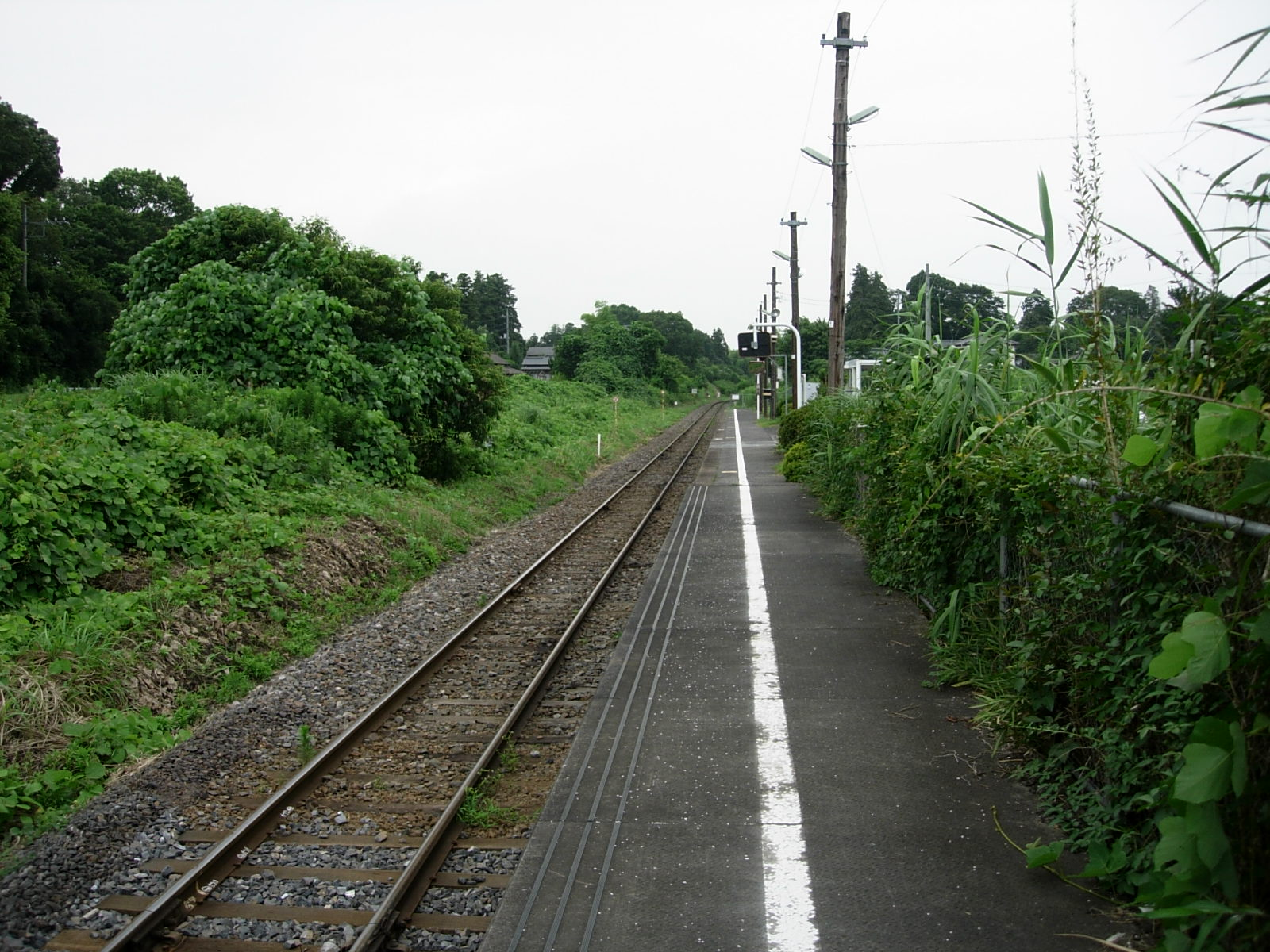
Platform

Nukada Station (額田駅, Nukada-eki) is a passenger railway station in the city of Naka, Ibaraki, Japan operated by East Japan Railway Company (JR East).

== Lines ==
Nukada Station is served by the Hitachi-Ōta Spur Line of the Suigun Line, and is located 3.6 rail kilometers from the official starting point of the spur line at Kami-Sugaya Station.

== Station layout ==
The station consists of a single side platform serving traffic in both directions. The station is unattended.

== History ==
Nukata Station opened on November 16, 1897 as a station on the Ota Railway. The Ota Railway merged with the Mito Railway on October 21, 1901 and was nationalized on December 1, 1927. The station was absorbed into the JR East network upon the privatization of the Japanese National Railways (JNR) on April 1, 1987.

== Surrounding area ==
- National Route 348
- Nukada Post Office
- Kuji River

== See also ==
- List of railway stations in Japan
