= Godai Station =

Railway station in Naka, Ibaraki Prefecture, Japan

Godai Station 後台駅
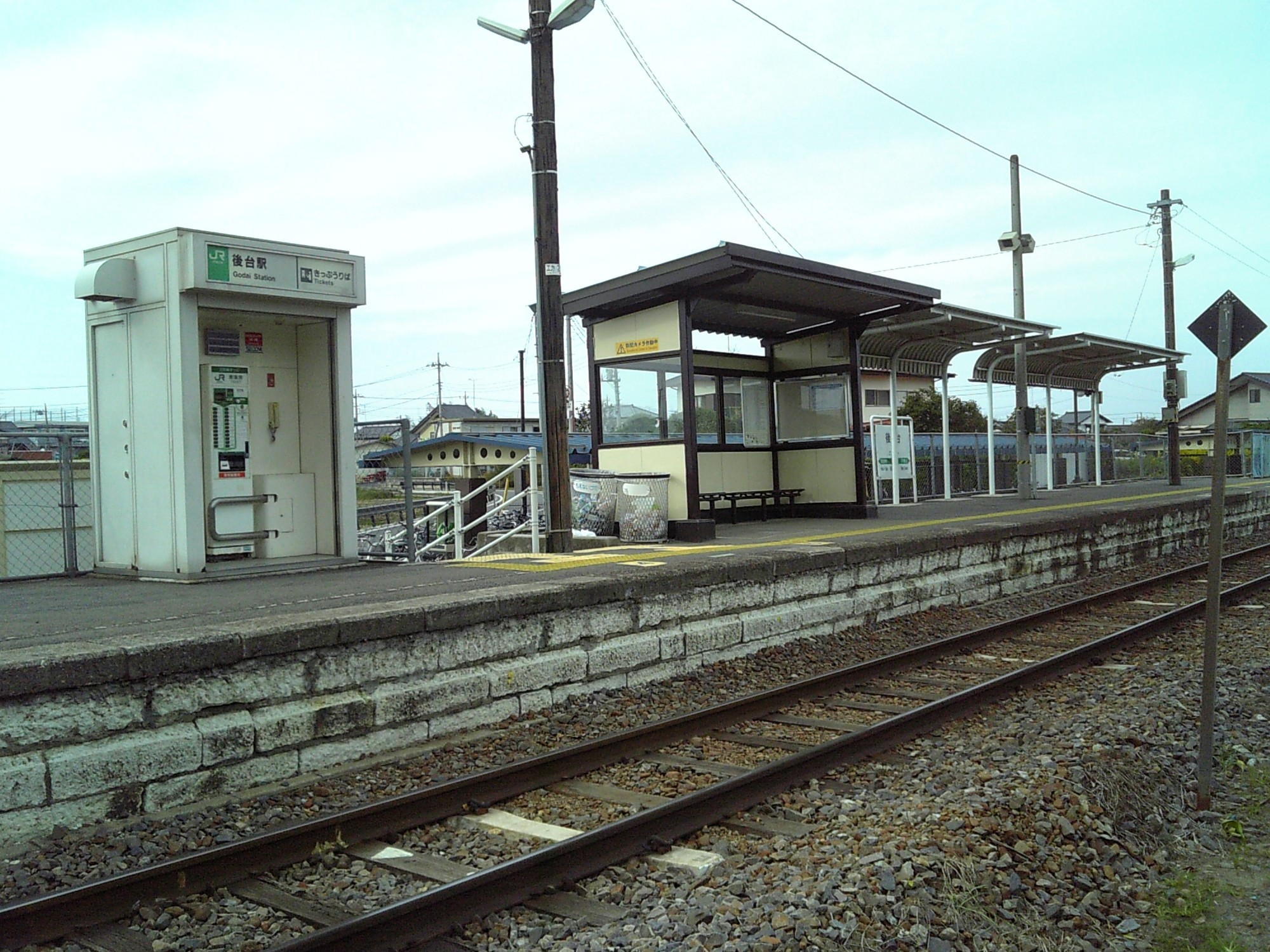
- Godai Station in October 2008

General information
- Location: Godai Shukunishi 695, Naka-shi, Ibaraki-ken 311-0111; Japan
- Coordinates: 36.4236°N 140.4897°E
- Operator: JR East
- Line: ■ Suigun Line
- Distance: 6.5 km from Mito
- Platforms: 1 side platform

Other information
- Status: Unstaffed
- Website: Official website

History
- Opened: September 1, 1935

Services
Preceding station	JR East	Following station
Hitachi-Tsuda towards Mito	Suigun Line	Shimo-Sugaya towards Kōriyama or Hitachi-Ōta
Location
- Location within Ibaraki Prefecture Location within Japan

Godai Station (後台駅, Godai-eki) is a passenger railway station in the city of Naka, Ibaraki, Japan operated by East Japan Railway Company (JR East).

== Lines ==
Godai Station is served by the Suigun Line, and is located 6.5 rail kilometers from the official starting point of the line at Mito Station.

== Station layout ==
The station consists of a single side platform serving traffic in both directions. There is no station building and the station is unattended.

== History ==
Godai Station opened on September 1, 1935. The station was absorbed into the JR East network upon the privatization of the Japanese National Railways (JNR) on April 1, 1987.

== Surrounding area ==
- Ibaraki Women's Junior college
- National Route 349
- Naka-Godai Post Office

== See also ==
- List of railway stations in Japan
