= Yagawara Station =

Railway station in Hitachiota, Ibaraki prefecture, Japan

Yagawara Station 谷河原駅
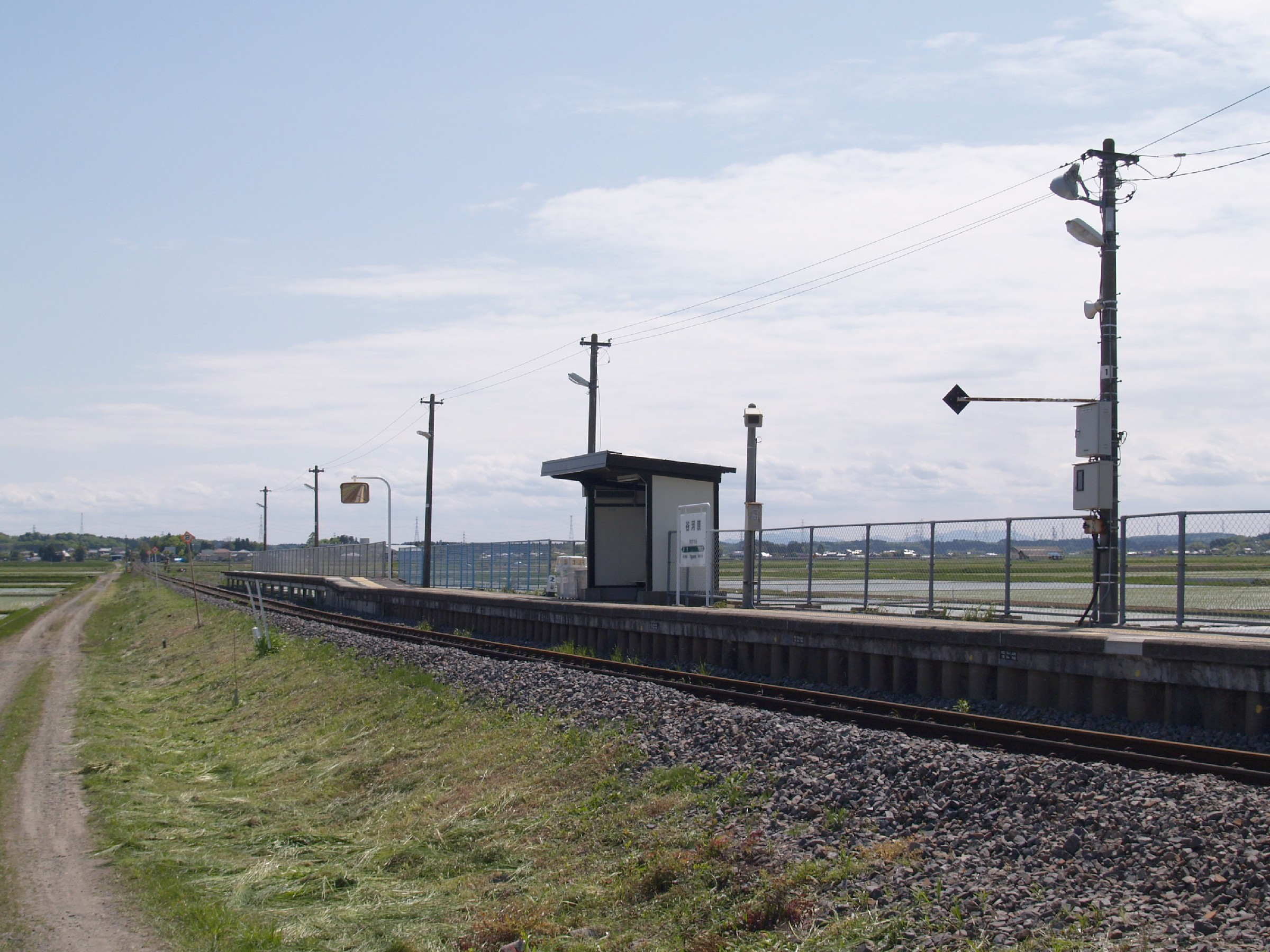
- Yagawara Station in May 2010

General information
- Location: Isobe-cho, Hitachiōta-shi, Ibaraki-ken 313-0042; Japan
- Coordinates: 36.5200°N 140.5248°E
- Operator: JR East
- Line: ■ Suigun Line
- Distance: 8.2 km from Kami-Sugaya
- Platforms: 1 side platform

Other information
- Status: Unstaffed
- Website: Official website

History
- Opened: September 1, 1935
- Closed: 1941-1954
- Former names: Satake (until 1954)

Services
Preceding station	JR East	Following station
Kawai towards Mito	Suigun Line Hitachi-Ōta Branch	Hitachi-Ōta Terminus
Location
- Location within Ibaraki Prefecture Location within Japan

Yagawara Station (谷河原駅, Yagawara-eki) is a passenger railway station in the city of Hitachiōta, Ibaraki Prefecture, operated by East Japan Railway Company (JR East).

== Lines ==
Yagawara Station is served by the Hitachi-Ōta Spur Line of the Suigun Line, and is located 8.2 rail kilometers from the official starting point of the spur line at Kami-Sugaya Station.

== Station layout ==
The station consists of a single side platform serving traffic in both directions. There is no station building, and station is unattended.

== History ==
Yagawara Station opened on September 1, 1935 as Satake Station (佐竹駅). The station was closed from August 10, 1941 until October 21, 1954, when it reopened under its present name. The station was absorbed into the JR East network upon the privatization of the Japanese National Railways (JNR) on April 1, 1987.

== Surrounding area ==
- National Route 349
- Satake Post Office

== See also ==
- List of railway stations in Japan
