= Mito Tokugawa clan cemetery =

Cemetery in Ibaraki Prefecture, Japan

- 水戸德川家墓所
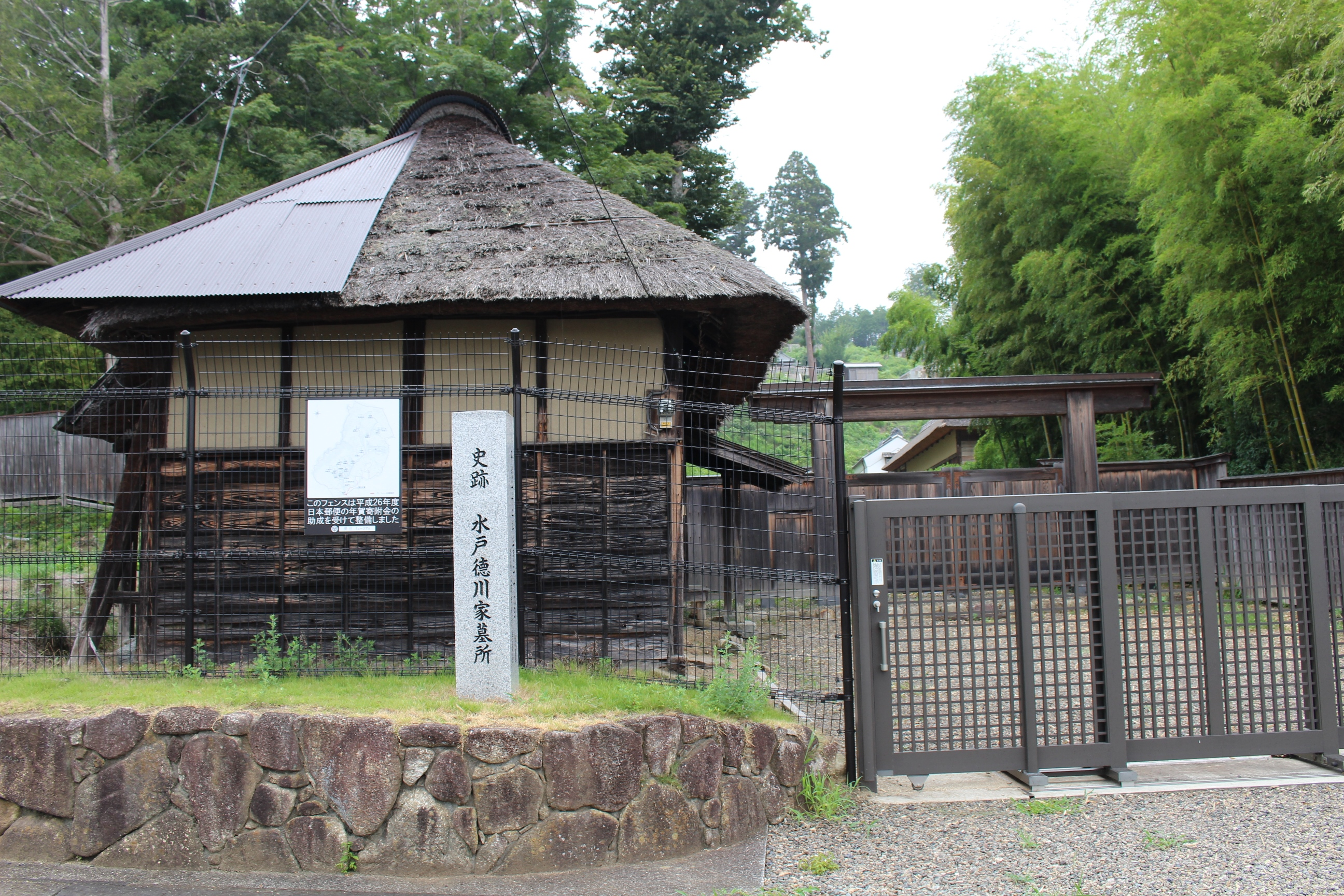
- Entrance to Mito Tokugawa clan cemetery

Details
- Established: 1661
- Location: Hitachiōta, Ibaraki
- Country: Japan
- Type: daimyō cemetery
- Owned by: Tokugawa foundation
- Website: Official website
- Footnotes: National Historic Site of Japan
- Mito Tokugawa clan cemetery (Ibaraki Prefecture) Mito Tokugawa clan cemetery (Japan)

The Mito Tokugawa clan cemetery (水戸德川家墓所, Mito Tokugawa-ke bosho) is located in the city of Hitachiōta, Ibaraki. The cemetery contains the graves of the Mito Tokugawa clan and three of its four cadet houses. This includes the successive daimyō of Mito Domain (250,000 koku), Matsudaira clan of Moriyama Domain (20,000 koku), Matsudaira clan of Hitachi-Fuchū Domain (20,000 koku) and the Matsudaira clan of Shishido Domain, 10,0000 koku. The only cadet branch whose graves are not at the cemetery is the Matsudaira clan of Takamatsu Domain, 120,000 koku). The cemetery was designated a National Historic Site in 2007.

== Overview ==
The Mito-Tokugawa clan descended from Tokugawa Yorifusa, the 11th son of Tokugawa Ieyasu and was one of the Gosanke branches of the Tokugawa clan, who were maintained to provide a shōgun should the main line of the clan die out. The cemetery is called Zuiryusan (瑞龍山), and is located on the southern hillside of Kunimiyama, which is an extension from the Abukuma Mountains in the northern part of Hitachiōta city in the northern part of Ibaraki Prefecture. It covers an area 360 meters east-to-west by 500 meters north-to-south, at an elevation of 134 to 165 meters. It is a scenic spot and was surrounded by Japanese red pine forests until the 1940s. The form of the gravestones is that of a stone monument with a bixi base in the shape of a dragon with the shell of a tortoise, and decorated with a Chi dragon, but with no religious symbolism or imagery. Funeral rites were conducted per Confucian rituals at outlined by the second daimyō of Mito Domain, Tokugawa Mitsukuni; there is no Buddhist temple at the cemetery, and Tokugawa Mitsukuni gave specific orders that no Buddhist priests would be allowed to even enter the cemetery precincts. The graveyard was established in 1661 with the burial of Tokugawa Yorifusa and the construction of the tombs for Yorifusa's concubine Hisako (Tokugawa Mitsukuni's mother) and Takeda Nobuyoshi in 1677. In total, 119 graves built in the Edo Period, including 29 graves for wives and consorts, 86 graves for cadet clansmen, and four tombs for non-related retainers. One of the non-related persons honored with a burial in this cemetery is the Chinese Confucian scholar Zhu Zhiyu, a Ming political refugee in Japan and close advisor to Tokugawa Mitsukuni.

The cemetery is located 15 minutes by car from Hitachi-Ōta Station on the JR East Suigun Line; however, it remains in private hands and is open to the public only at irregular intervals.

== See also ==
- List of Historic Sites of Japan (Ibaraki)
