= Shimo-Sugaya Station =

Railway station in Naka, Ibaraki Prefecture, Japan

Shimo-Sugaya Station 下菅谷駅
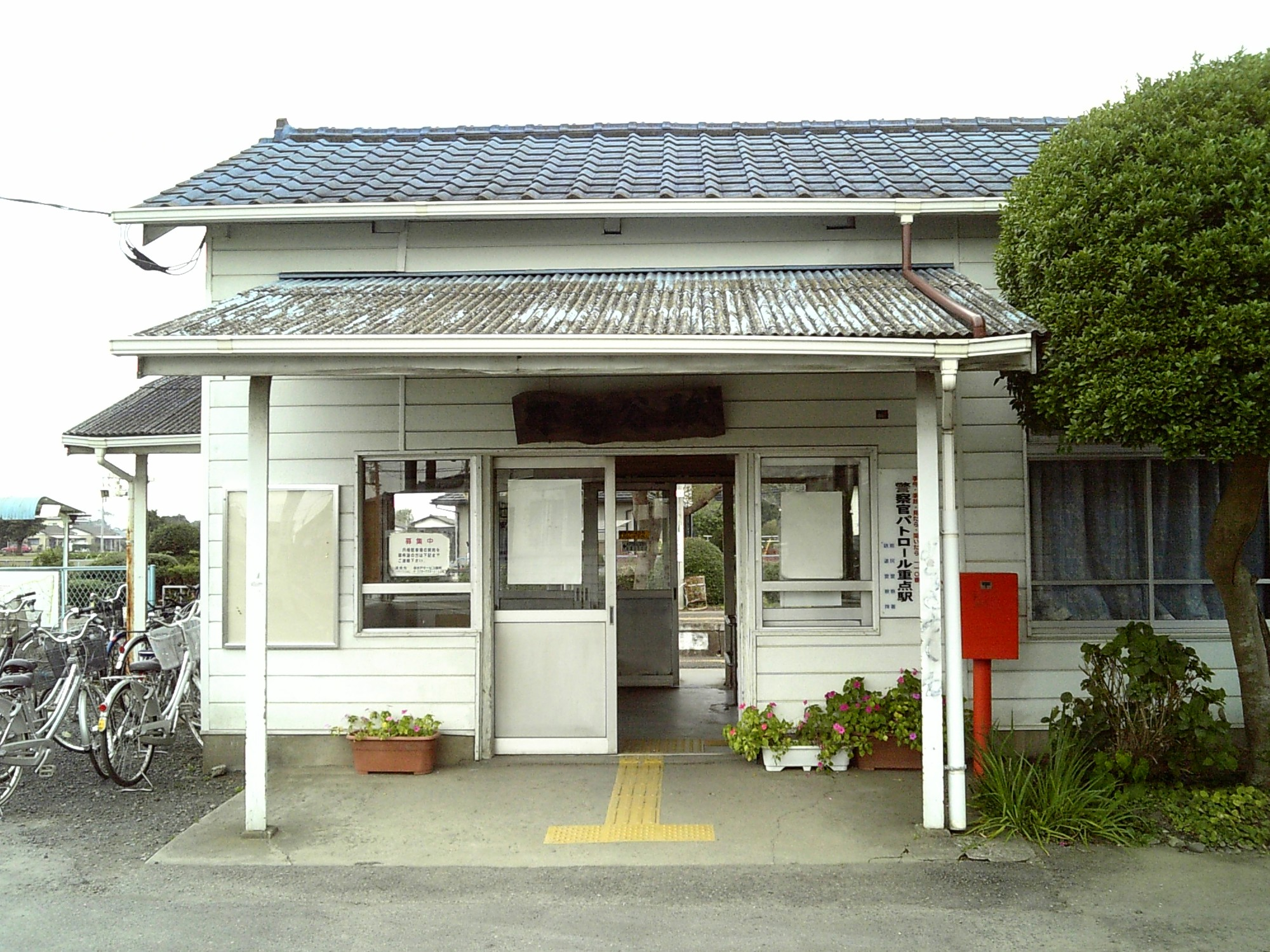
- Shimo-Sugaya Station in October 2008

General information
- Location: Sugaya 4106, Naka-shi, Ibaraki-ken 311-0105; Japan
- Coordinates: 36.4354°N 140.4939°E
- Operator: JR East
- Line: ■ Suigun Line
- Distance: 7.8 km from Mito
- Platforms: 2 side platforms

Other information
- Status: Unstaffed
- Website: Official website

History
- Opened: November 16, 1896

Passengers
- FY2008: 172 daily

Services
Preceding station	JR East	Following station
Godai towards Mito	Suigun Line	Naka-Sugaya towards Kōriyama or Hitachi-Ōta
Location
- Location within Ibaraki Prefecture Location within Japan

Shimo-Sugaya Station (下菅谷駅, Shimo-Sugaya-eki) is a passenger railway station in the city of Naka, Ibaraki, Japan operated by East Japan Railway Company (JR East).

== Lines ==
Shimo-Sugaya Station is served by the Suigun Line, and is located 7.8 rail kilometers from the official starting point of the line at Mito Station.

== Station layout ==
The station consists of two unnumbered opposed side platforms connected to the station building by a footbridge. The station is unattended.

=== Platforms ===
station side	■ Suigun Line	for Hitachi-Ōta and Kōriyama
opposite side	■ Suigun Line	for Mito

== History ==
Shimo-Sugaya Station opened on November 16, 1896 as a station on the Ota Railway. The Ota Railway merged with the Mito Railway on October 21, 1901 and was nationalized on December 1, 1927. The station was absorbed into the JR East network upon the privatization of the Japanese National Railways (JNR) on April 1, 1987.

== Surrounding area ==
- National Route 349

== See also ==
- List of railway stations in Japan
