= Kawai Station (Ibaraki) =

Railway station in Hitachiota, Ibaraki prefecture, Japan

Kawai Station 河合駅
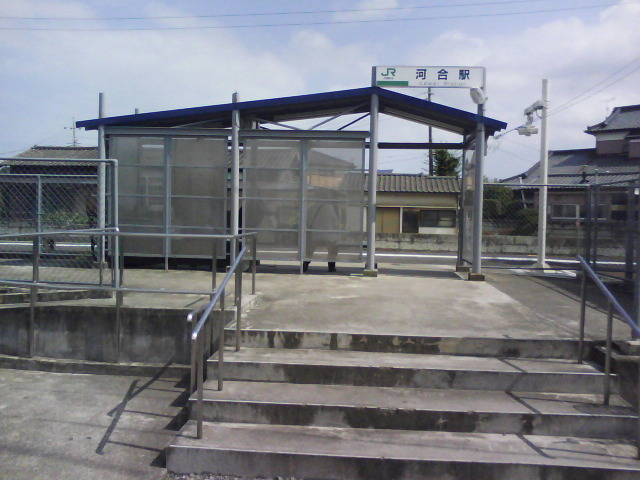
- Kawai Station in September 2009

General information
- Location: Kami-Kawai-cho, Hitachiōta-shi, Ibaraki-ken 313-0046; Japan
- Coordinates: 36.5080°N 140.5172°E
- Operator: JR East
- Line: ■ Suigun Line
- Distance: 6.7 km from Kami-Sugaya
- Platforms: 1 side platform

Other information
- Status: Unstaffed
- Website: Official website

History
- Opened: September 7, 1898

Services
Preceding station	JR East	Following station
Nukada towards Mito	Suigun Line Hitachi-Ōta Branch	Yagawara towards Hitachi-Ōta
Location
- Location within Ibaraki Prefecture Location within Japan

Kawai Station (河合駅, Kawai-eki) is a passenger railway station in the city of Hitachiōta, Ibaraki Prefecture, operated by East Japan Railway Company (JR East).

== Lines ==
Kawai Station is served by the Hitachi-Ōta Spur Line of the Suigun Line, and is located 6.7 rail kilometers from the official starting point of the spur line at Kami-Sugaya Station.

== Station layout ==
The station consists of a single side platform serving traffic in both directions. There is no station building, and the station is unattended.

== History ==
Kawai Station opened on September 7, 1898 as a station on the Ota Railway. The Ota Railway merged with the Mito Railway on October 21, 1901 and was nationalized on December 1, 1927. The station was absorbed into the JR East network upon the privatization of the Japanese National Railways (JNR) on April 1, 1987.

== Surrounding area ==
- National Route 349
- Kujigawa River

== See also ==
- List of railway stations in Japan
