= Hitachi-Tsuda Station =

Railway station in Hitachinaka, Ibaraki Prefecture, Japan

Hitachi-Tsuda Station 常陸津田駅
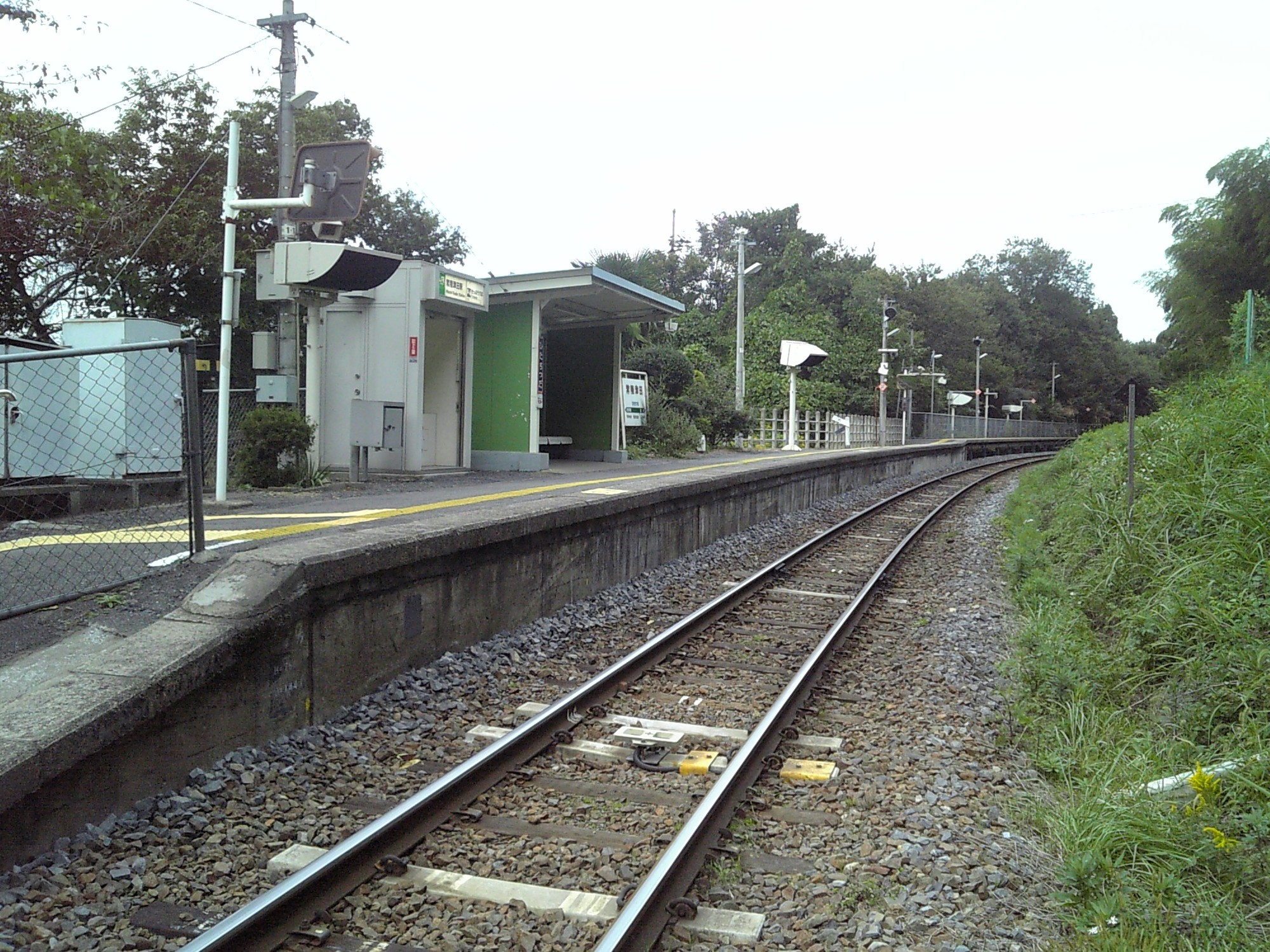
- Hitachi-Tsuda Station in October 2008

General information
- Location: Tsuda-Nishiyama 2171-1, Hitachinaka-shi, Ibaraki-ken 312-0032; Japan
- Coordinates: 36.4041°N 140.4829°E
- Operator: JR East
- Line: ■ Suigun Line
- Distance: 4.1 km from Mito
- Platforms: 1 side platform

Other information
- Status: Unstaffed
- Website: Official website

History
- Opened: September 1, 1935

Passengers
- FY2009: 268

Services
Preceding station	JR East	Following station
Hitachi-Aoyagi towards Mito	Suigun Line	Godai towards Kōriyama or Hitachi-Ōta
Location
- Location within Ibaraki Prefecture Location within Japan

Hitachi-Tsuda Station (常陸津田駅, Hitachi-Tsuda-eki) is a railway station in the city of Hitachinaka, Ibaraki, Japan operated by East Japan Railway Company (JR East).

== Lines ==
Hitachi-Tsuda Station is served by the Suigun Line, and is located 4.1 rail kilometers from the official starting point of the line at Mito Station.

== Station layout ==
The station consists of a single side platform serving traffic in both directions. There is no station building and the station is unattended.

== History ==
Hitachi-Tsuda Station opened on September 1, 1935. The station was absorbed into the JR East network upon the privatization of the Japanese National Railways (JNR) on April 1, 1987.

== Surrounding area ==
- National Route 348
- Hitachi-Tsuda Post Office

== See also ==
- List of railway stations in Japan
