= Hitachi-Aoyagi Station =

Railway station in Hitachinaka, Ibaraki Prefecture, Japan

Hitachi-Aoyagi Station 常陸青柳駅
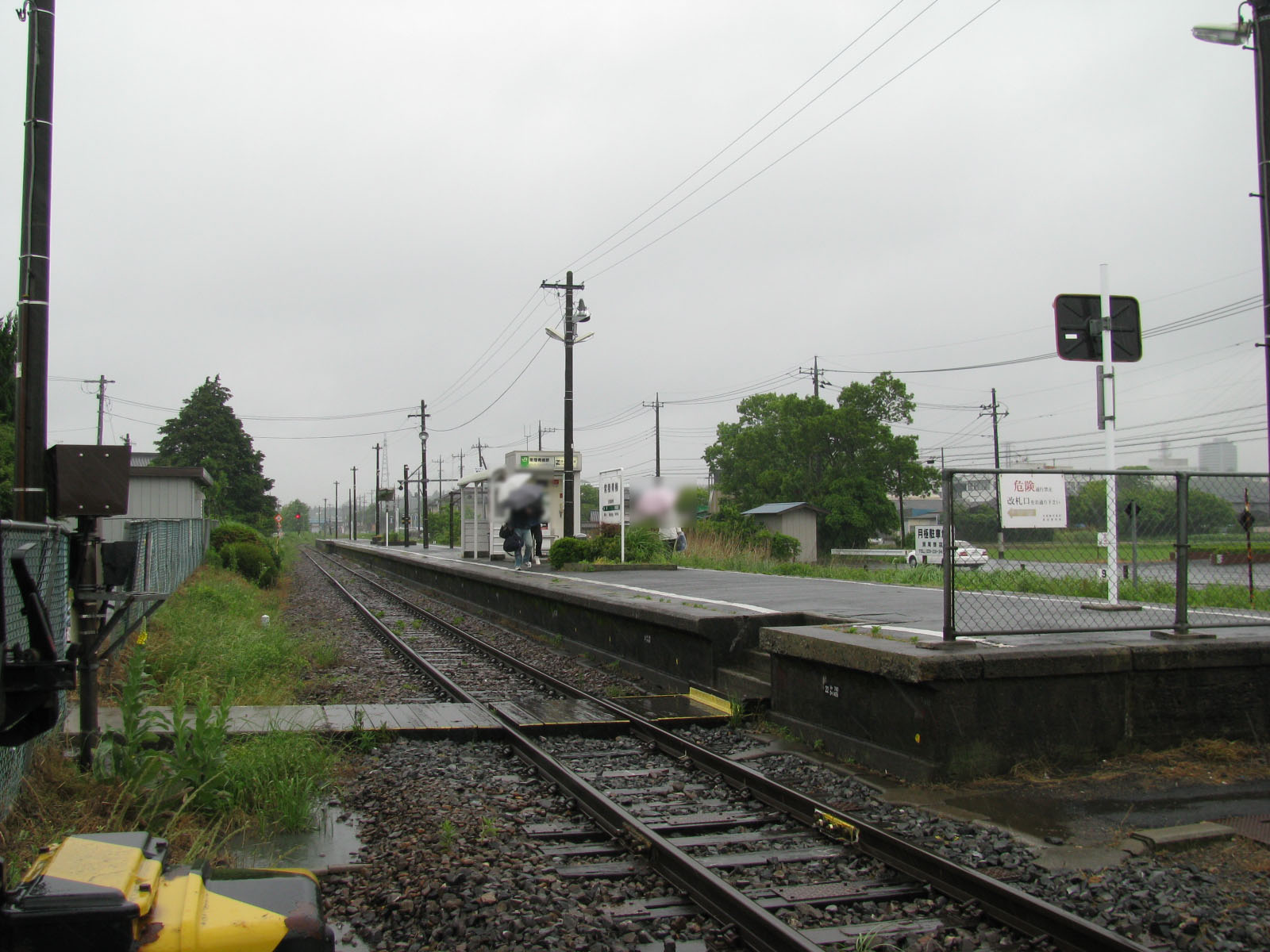
- Hitachi-Aoyagi Station in May 2008

General information
- Location: Edagawa 363, Hitachinaka-shi, Ibaraki-ken 310-0004; Japan
- Coordinates: 36.3838°N 140.4843°E
- Operator: JR East
- Line: ■ Suigun Line
- Distance: 1.9 km from Mito
- Platforms: 1 island platform

Other information
- Status: Unstaffed
- Website: Official website

History
- Opened: November 16, 1896
- Former names: Aoyagi (until 1927)

Passengers
- FY2009: 144 daily

Services
| Preceding station | JR East | Following station |
|---|---|---|
| Mito Terminus | Suigun Line | Hitachi-Tsuda towards Kōriyama or Hitachi-Ōta |
Location
- Location within Ibaraki Prefecture Location within Japan

Hitachi-Aoyagi Station (常陸青柳駅, Hitachi-Aoyagi-eki) is a passenger railway station in the city of Hitachinaka, Ibaraki, Japan operated by East Japan Railway Company (JR East).

== Lines ==
Hitachi-Aoyagi Station is served by the Suigun Line, and is located 1.9 rail kilometers from the official starting point of the line at Mito Station.

== Station layout ==
The station consists of a single island platform with a level crossing. There is no station building and the station is unattended.

== History ==
Hitachi-Aoyagi Station opened on November 16, 1896 as Aoyagi Station (青柳駅) on the Ota Railway. The railway later merged with the Mito Railway on October 21, 1901. The station was renamed to its current name when the Ota Railway was nationalized into the Japanese National Railways (JNR) on December 1, 1927. The station became part of the JR East network following the privatization of JNR on April 1, 1987.

== Surrounding area ==
- National Route 349
- Mito Citizen's Athletic Stadium

== See also ==
- List of railway stations in Japan
