= Minami-Sakaide Station =

Railway station in Naka, Ibaraki prefecture, Japan

Minami-Sakaide Station 南酒出駅
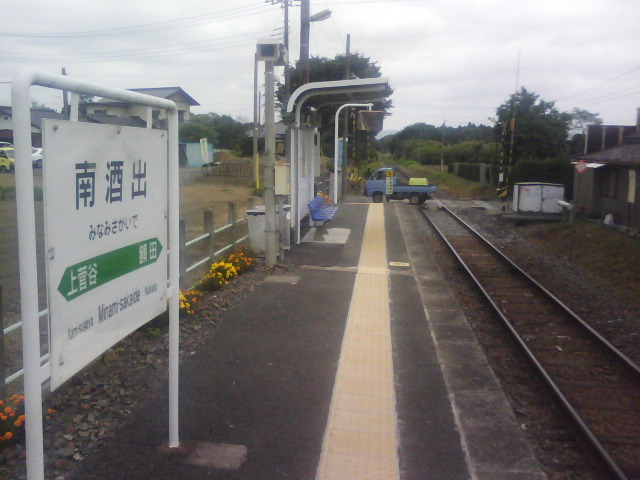
- Minami-Sakaide Station in February 2009

General information
- Location: Minami-Sakaide Funaoka Kubo 903-1, Naka-shi, Ibaraki-ken 311-0132; Japan
- Coordinates: 36.4774°N 140.4986°E
- Operator: JR East
- Line: ■ Suigun Line
- Distance: 2.5 km from Kami-Sugaya
- Platforms: 1 side platform

Other information
- Status: Unstaffed
- Website: Official website

History
- Opened: September 1, 1935
- Former names: Hitachi-Sakaide (until 1953)

Services
| Preceding station | JR East | Following station |
|---|---|---|
| Kami-Sugaya towards Mito | Suigun Line Hitachi-Ōta Branch | Nukada towards Hitachi-Ōta |
Location
- Location within Ibaraki Prefecture Location within Japan

Minami-Sakaide Station (南酒出駅, Minami-Sakaide-eki) is a passenger railway station in the city of Naka, Ibaraki Prefecture, operated by East Japan Railway Company (JR East).

== Lines ==
Minami-Sakaide Station is served by the Hitachi-Ōta Spur Line of the Suigun Line, and is located 2.5 rail kilometers from the official starting point of the spur line at Kami-Sugaya Station.

== Station layout ==
The station has a single side platform serving traffic in both directions. There is no station building, and the station is unattended.

== History ==
Minami-Sakaide Station opened on September 1, 1935 as Hitachi-Sakaide Station (常陸酒出駅). Operations were suspended from August 10, 1941 to February 1, 1953 when the station was renamed to its present name. The station was absorbed into the JR East network upon the privatization of the Japanese National Railways (JNR) on April 1, 1987.

== Surrounding area ==
- National Route 348

== See also ==
- List of railway stations in Japan
