= Urizura Station =

Railway station in Naka, Ibaraki Prefecture, Japan

Urizura Station 瓜連駅
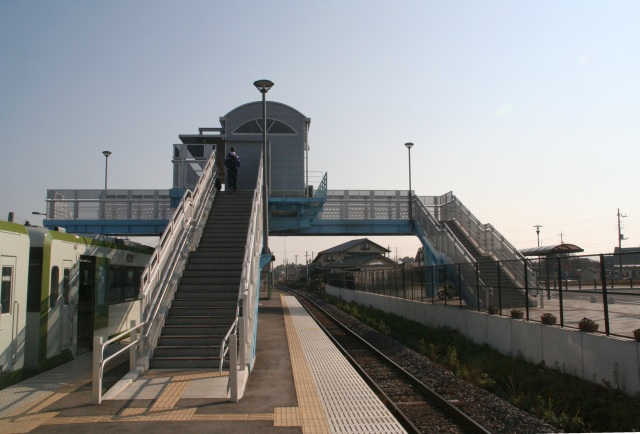
- Urizura Station in December 2007

General information
- Location: Urizura, Naka-shi, Ibaraki-ken 319-2102; Japan
- Coordinates: 36.4978°N 140.4506°E
- Operator: JR East
- Line: ■ Suigun Line
- Distance: 16.7 km from Mito
- Platforms: 1 island platform

Other information
- Status: Staffed
- Website: Official website

History
- Opened: June 12, 1918

Passengers
- FY2019: 261

Services
Preceding station	JR East	Following station
Hitachi-Kōnosu towards Mito	Suigun Line	Shizu towards Kōriyama
Location
- Location within Ibaraki Prefecture Location within Japan

Urizura Station (瓜連駅, Urizura-eki) is a passenger railway station in the city of Naka, Ibaraki, Japan operated by East Japan Railway Company (JR East).

== Lines ==
Urizura Station is served by the Suigun Line, and is located 16.7 rail kilometers from the official starting point of the line at Mito Station.

== Station layout ==
The station consists of a single island platform. The station building is elevated and located on a cantilever pedestrian overpass connecting the platform with the road. The station is staffed.

=== Platforms ===
1	■ Suigun Line	for Hitachi-Ōta and Kōriyama
2	■ Suigun Line	for Mito

== History ==
Urizura Station opened on June 12, 1918 as a station on the Mito Railway which was nationalized on December 1, 1927. The station was absorbed into the JR East network upon the privatization of the Japanese National Railways (JNR) on April 1, 1987.

== Passenger statistics ==
In fiscal 2019, the station was used by an average of 261 passengers daily (boarding passengers only).

== Surrounding area ==
- National Route 118
- former Urizura Town Hall
- Urizura Post Office

== See also ==
- List of railway stations in Japan
