= Naka-Sugaya Station =

Railway station in Naka, Ibaraki Prefecture, Japan

Naka-Sugaya Station 中菅谷駅
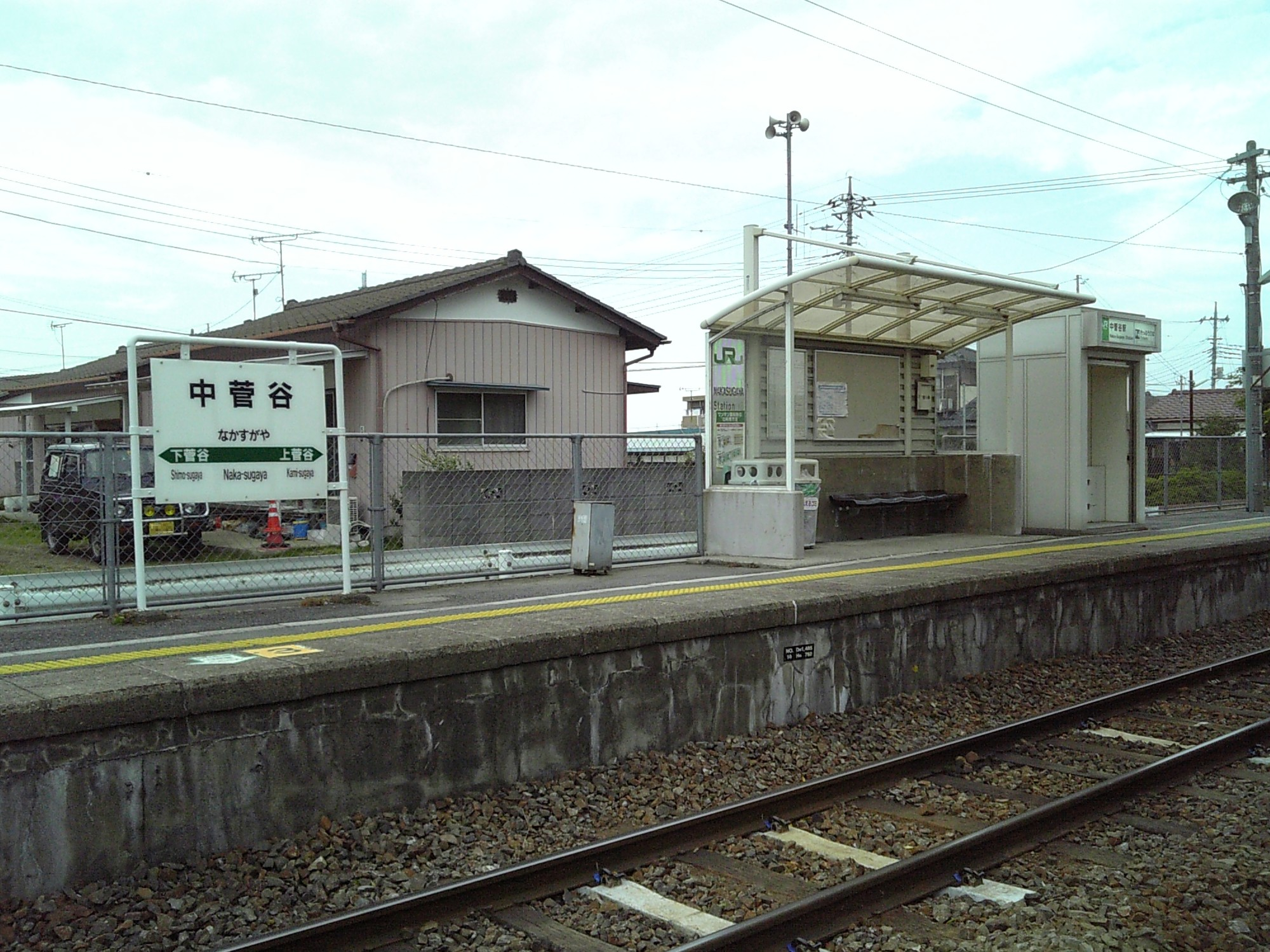
- Naka-Sugaya Station in October 2008

General information
- Location: Sugaya 4300-2, Naka-shi, Ibaraki-ken 311-0105; Japan
- Coordinates: 36.4456°N 140.4929°E
- Operator: JR East
- Line: ■ Suigun Line
- Distance: 9.0 km from Mito
- Platforms: 1 side platform

Other information
- Status: Unstaffed
- Website: Official website

History
- Opened: September 1, 1935

Services
Preceding station	JR East	Following station
Shimo-Sugaya towards Mito	Suigun Line	Kami-Sugaya towards Kōriyama or Hitachi-Ōta
Location
- Location within Ibaraki Prefecture Location within Japan

Naka-Sugaya Station (中菅谷駅, Naka-Sugaya-eki) is a passenger railway station in the city of Naka, Ibaraki, Japan operated by East Japan Railway Company (JR East).

== Lines ==
Naka-Sugaya Station is served by the Suigun Line, and is located 9.0 rail kilometers from the official starting point of the line at Mito Station.

== Station layout ==
The station consists of one side platform serving traffic in both directions. There is no station building and the station is unattended.

== History ==
Naka-Sugaya Station opened on September 1, 1935. The station was absorbed into the JR East network upon the privatization of the Japanese National Railways (JNR) on April 1, 1987.

== Surrounding area ==
- Naka-Sugaya Post Office

== See also ==
- List of railway stations in Japan
