= Sakaide (disambiguation) =

Sakaide is a city located in Kagawa Prefecture, Japan. It may also refer to:

- Sakaide Station, a junction railway station located in the city of Sakaide, Kagawa Prefecture, Japan
- The Sakaide Route, a section of the Takamatsu Expressway, an expressway in the Shikoku region of Japan
- Minami-Sakaide Station, a passenger railway station in the city of Naka, Ibaraki Prefecture, Japan
