= Iwaki-Moriyama Station =

Railway station in Kōriyama, Fukushima Prefecture, Japan

Iwaki-Moriyama Station 磐城守山駅
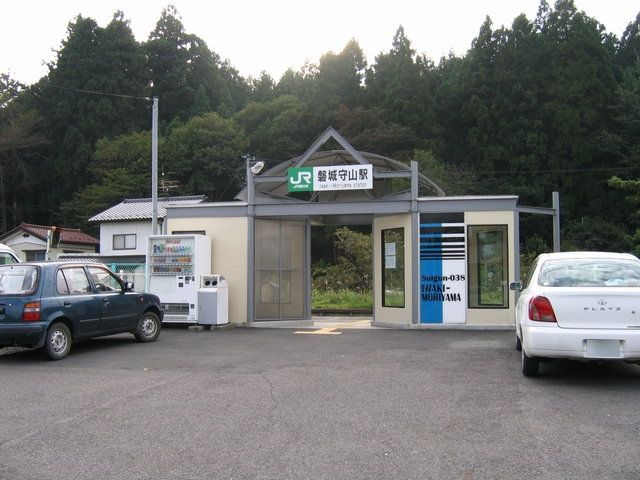
- Iwaki-Moriyama Station in October 2006

General information
- Location: Tamuramachi-Iwasaku Nishikawahara 181, Kōriyama-shi, Fukushima-ken 963-1154; Japan
- Coordinates: 37.3309°N 140.4063°E
- Operator: JR East
- Line: ■ Suigun Line
- Distance: 132.1 km from Mito
- Platforms: 1 side platform
- Tracks: 1

Other information
- Status: Unstaffed
- Website: Official website

History
- Opened: May 10, 1929

Passengers
- FY2013: 79 daily

Services
Preceding station	JR East	Following station
Yatagawa towards Mito	Suigun Line	Asaka-Nagamori towards Kōriyama
Location
- Location within Fukushima Prefecture Location within Japan

Iwaki-Moriyama Station (磐城守山駅, Iwaki-Moriyama-eki) is a railway station in the city of Kōriyama, Fukushima, Japan operated by East Japan Railway Company (JR East).

== Lines ==
Iwaki-Moriyama Station is served by the Suigun Line, and is located 132.1 rail kilometers from the official starting point of the line at Mito.

== Station layout ==
The station has a one side platform serving a single bi-directional track. The station formerly had two opposed side platforms, but one of the platforms is no longer in use.

== History ==
Iwaki-Moriyama Station opened on May 10, 1929. The station was absorbed into the JR East network upon the privatization of the Japanese National Railways (JNR) on April 1, 1987.

== Surrounding area ==
- National Route 49
- Moriyama Post Office
- Moriyama Onsen

== See also ==
- List of railway stations in Japan
