= Asaka-Nagamori Station =

Railway station in Kōriyama, Fukushima Prefecture, Japan

Asaka-Nagamori Station 安積永盛駅
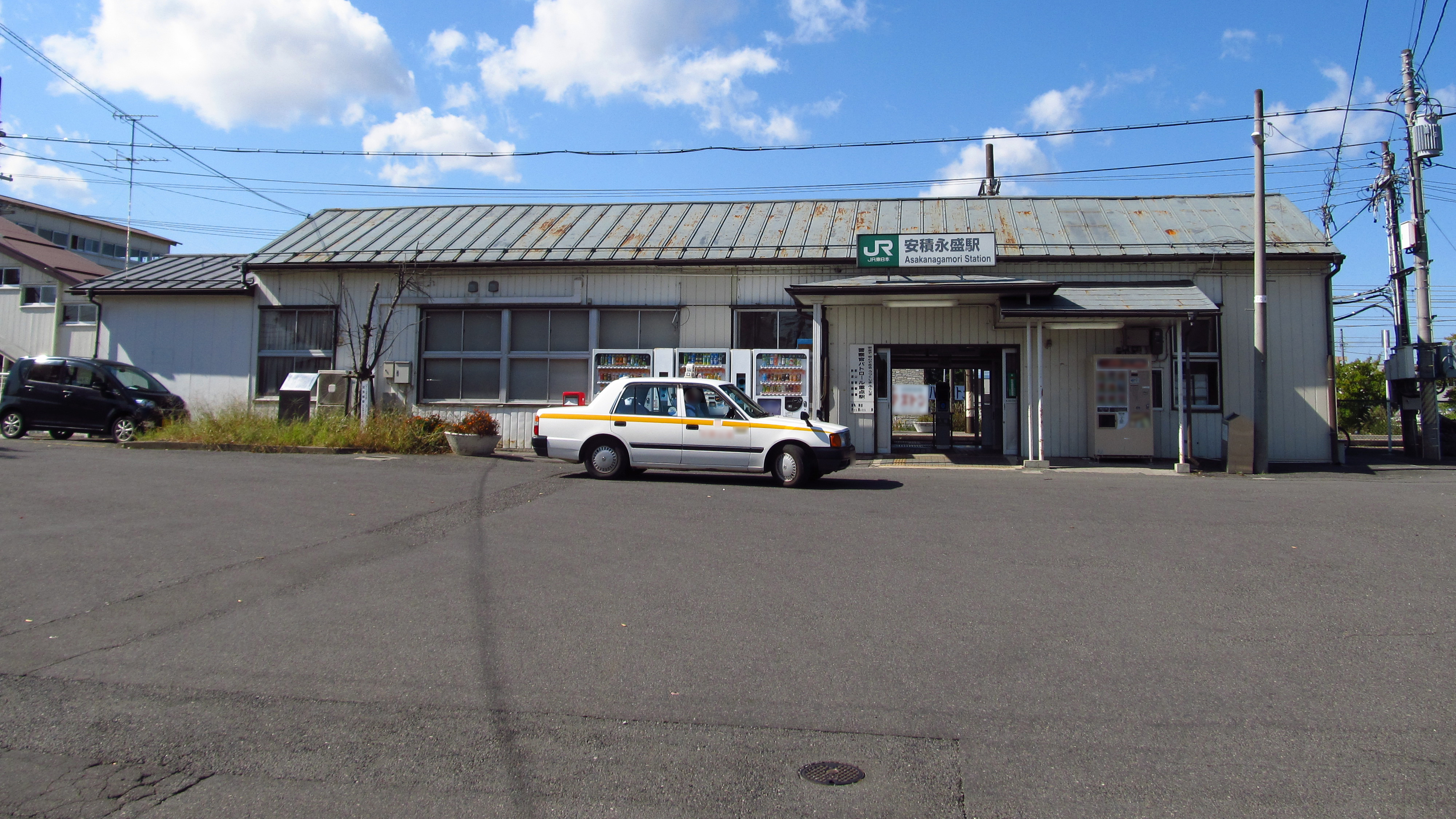
- Asaka-Nagamori Station in October 2015

General information
- Location: Sasagawa 3-267, Kōriyama-shi, Fukushima-ken 963-0108; Japan
- Coordinates: 37.3570252°N 140.3691173°E
- Operator: JR East
- Lines: ■ Tōhoku Main Line; ■ Suigun Line
- Connections: Bus stop

Other information
- Status: Staffed ( Midori no Madoguchi )
- Website: Official website

History
- Opened: October 18, 1909
- Former names: Sasagawa (until 1931)

Passengers
- FY2018: 2476 daily

Services
Preceding station	JR East	Following station
Sukagawa towards Kuroiso	Tōhoku Main Line Local	Kōriyama towards Morioka
Iwaki-Moriyama towards Mito	Suigun Line	Kōriyama Terminus
Location
- Location within Fukushima Prefecture Location within Japan

Asaka-Nagamori Station (安積永盛駅, Asaka-Nagamori-eki) is a junction railway station in the city of Kōriyama, Fukushima Prefecture, Japan operated by East Japan Railway Company (JR East).

== Lines ==
Asaka-Nagamori Station is served by the Tōhoku Main Line, and is located 221.8 rail kilometers from the official starting point of the line at Tokyo It is also served by the Suigun Line and is 137.5 rail kilometers from the starting point of that line at Mito.

== Station layout ==
The station has a side platform and a single island platform connected to the station building by a footbridge. The station has a Midori no Madoguchi staffed ticket office.

=== Platforms ===
1	■ Suigun Line	for Mito and Kōriyama
1	■ Tōhoku Main Line	for Kuroiso, and Utsunomiya
2	■ Tōhoku Main Line	for Kuroiso and Utsunomiya
2	■ Suigun Line	for Mito
3	■ Tōhoku Main Line	for Kōriyama, Fukushima and Sendai

== History ==
Asaka-Nagamori Station opened on October 18, 1909, as Sasagawa Station (笹川駅, Sasagawa-eki). The Suigun Line began operations from May 10, 1929. The station was renamed to its present name on October 30, 1931. The station was absorbed into the JR East network upon the privatization of the Japanese National Railways (JNR) on April 1, 1987.

== Passenger statistics ==
In fiscal 2018, the station was used by an average of 2476 passengers daily (boarding passengers only).

== Surrounding area ==
- National Route 4
- Abukuma River
- Kōriyama Minami Post Office
- Kōriyama Sasagawa Post Office

== See also ==
- List of railway stations in Japan
