= Kawai Station =

Kawai Station is the name of two train stations in Japan:

- Kawai Station (Ibaraki) (河合駅)
- Kawai Station (Tokyo) (川井駅)
