= Iwaki-Asakawa Station =

Railway station in Asakawa, Fukushima Prefecture, Japan

Iwaki-Asakawa Station 磐城浅川駅
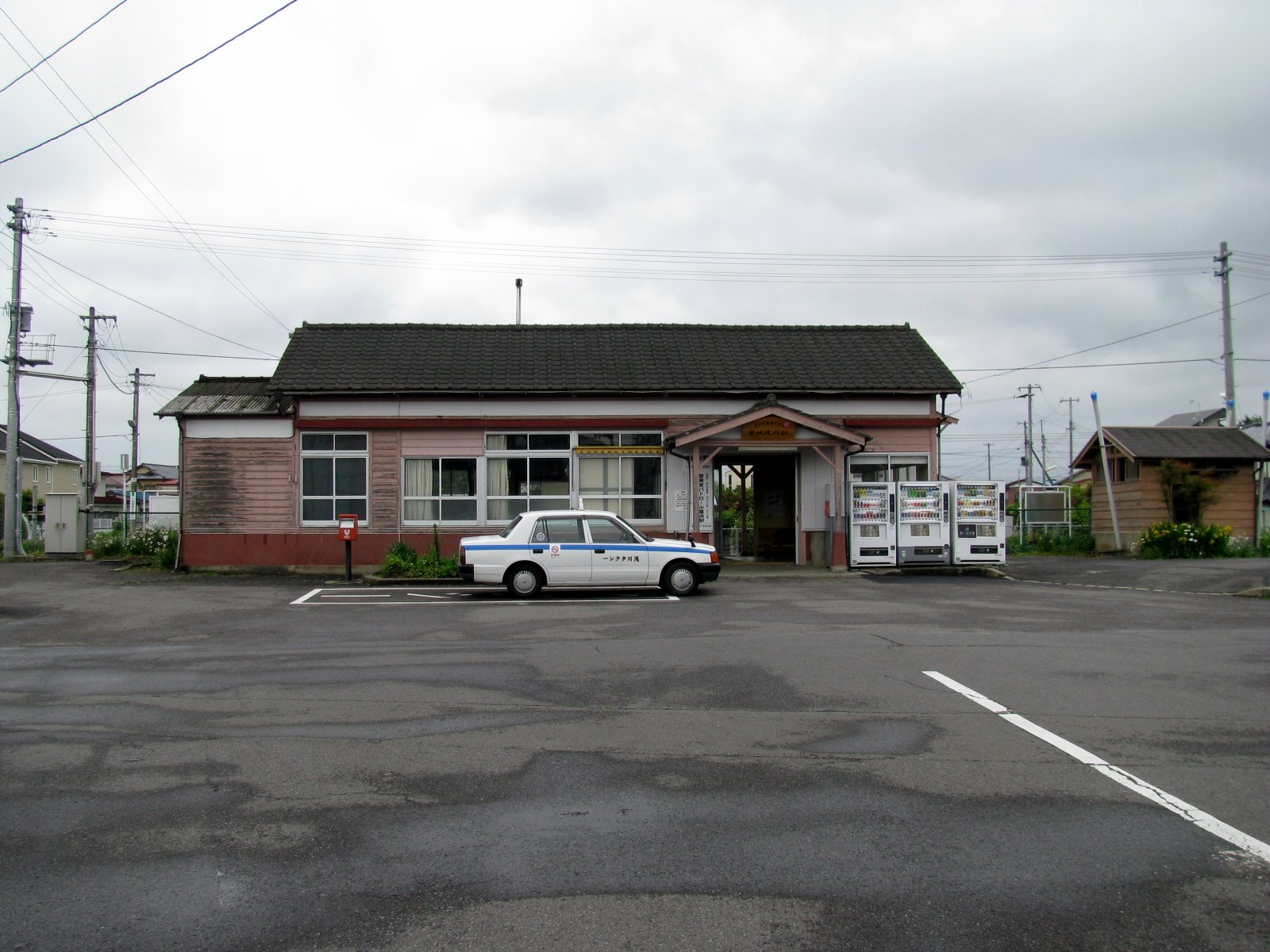
- Iwaki-Asakawa Station in May 2008

General information
- Location: Asakawa Honcho Nishiura 58, Asakawa-machi, Ishikawa-gun, Fukushima-ken 963-6204; Japan
- Coordinates: 37.0800°N 140.4143°E
- Operator: JR East
- Line: ■ Suigun Line
- Distance: 97.0 km from Mito
- Platforms: 2 side platforms
- Tracks: 2

Other information
- Status: Staffed
- Website: Official website

History
- Opened: December 4, 1934

Passengers
- FY2018: 174 daily

Services
Preceding station	JR East	Following station
Iwaki-Tanakura towards Mito	Suigun Line	Satoshiraishi towards Kōriyama
Location
- Location within Fukushima Prefecture Location within Japan

Iwaki-Asakawa Station (磐城浅川駅, Iwaki-Asakawa-eki) is a railway station in the town of Asakawa, Fukushima, Japan operated by East Japan Railway Company (JR East).

== Lines ==
Iwaki-Asakawa Station is served by the Suigun Line, and is located 97.0 rail kilometers from the official starting point of the line at Mito.

== Station layout ==
The station has two opposed side platforms connected by a footbridge. However, only one of the platforms is currently in operation. The station is staffed.

=== Platforms ===
1	■ Suigun Line	for Mito for Kōriyama
2	■ Suigun Line	siding

== History ==
Iwaki-Asakawa Station opened on December 4, 1934. The station was absorbed into the JR East network upon the privatization of the Japanese National Railways (JNR) on April 1, 1987.

== Passenger statistics ==
In fiscal 2018, the station was used by an average of 174 passengers daily (boarding passengers only).

== Surrounding area ==
- Asakawa Town Hall
- Asakawa Post Office
- National Route 118

== See also ==
- List of railway stations in Japan
