= Shizu Station (Ibaraki) =

Railway station in Naka, Ibaraki Prefecture, Japan

Shizu Station 静駅
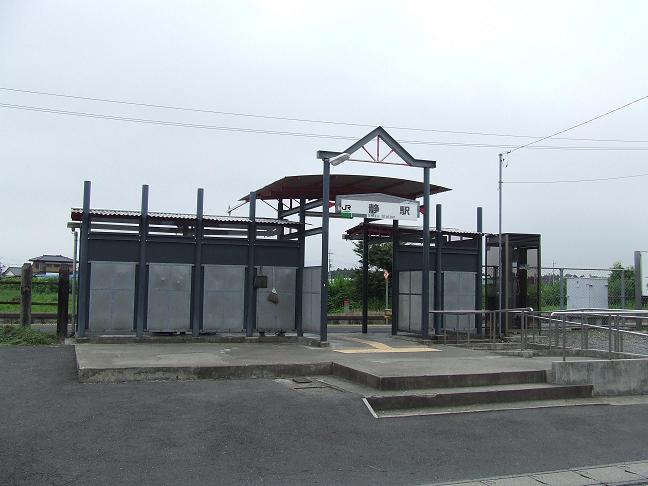
- Shizu Station in August 2008

General information
- Location: Shimo-Ōga, Naka-shi, Ibaraki-ken 319-2107; Japan
- Coordinates: 36.5062°N 140.4383°E
- Operator: JR East
- Line: ■ Suigun Line
- Distance: 18.1 km from Mito
- Platforms: 1 side platform

Other information
- Status: Unstaffed
- Website: Official website

History
- Opened: February 1, 1919

Services
Preceding station	JR East	Following station
Urizura towards Mito	Suigun Line	Hitachi-Ōmiya towards Kōriyama
Location
- Location within Ibaraki Prefecture Location within Japan

Shizu Station (静駅, Shizu-eki) is a passenger railway station in the city of Naka, Ibaraki, Japan operated by East Japan Railway Company (JR East).

== Lines ==
Shizu Station is served by the Suigun Line, and is located 18.1 rail kilometers from the official starting point of the line at Mito Station.

== Station layout ==
The station consists of a single side platform serving traffic in both directions. The station originally had two opposed side platforms, and the ruins of the second platform are still in situ. There is no station building. The station is unattended.

== History ==
Shizu Station opened on February 1, 1919 as a station on the Mito Railway which was nationalized on December 1, 1927. The station was absorbed into the JR East network upon the privatization of the Japanese National Railways (JNR) on April 1, 1987.

== Surrounding area ==
- National Route 118
- Shizu Jinja

== See also ==
- List of railway stations in Japan
