= Hitachi-Kōnosu Station =

Railway station in Naka, Ibaraki Prefecture, Japan

Hitachi-Kōnosu Station 常陸鴻巣駅
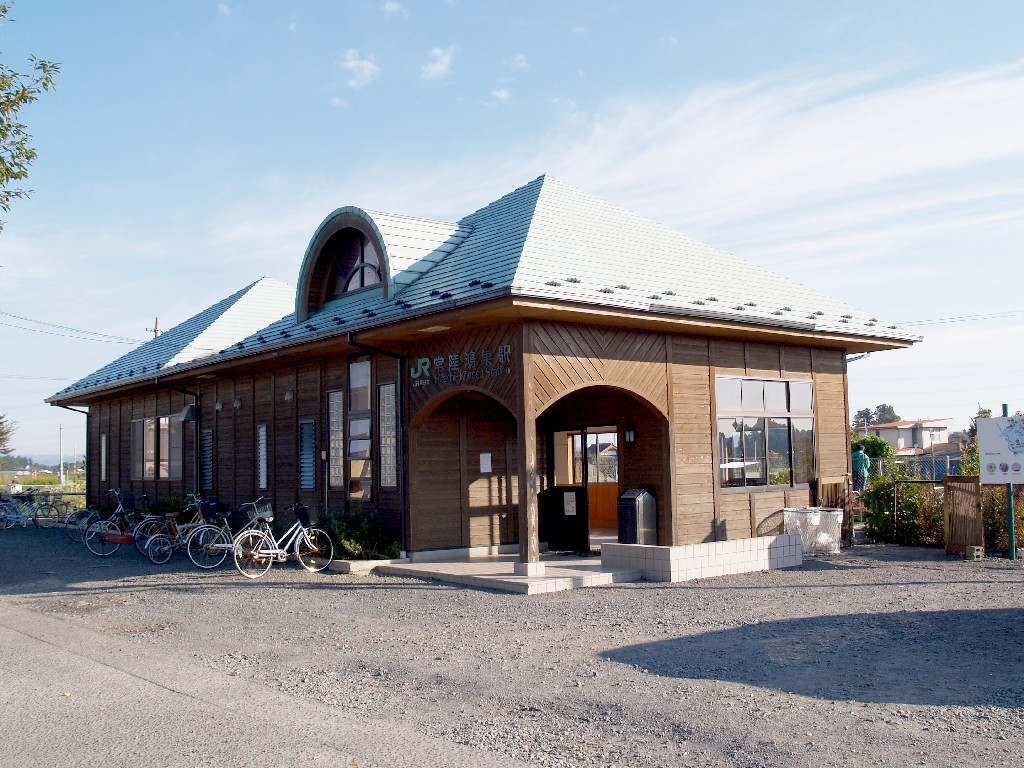
- Hitachi-Kōnosu Station in October 2007

General information
- Location: Kōnosu 1362, Naka-shi, Ibaraki-ken 311-0133; Japan
- Coordinates: 36.4726°N 140.4676°E
- Operator: JR East
- Line: ■ Suigun Line
- Distance: 13.4 km from Mito
- Platforms: 1 side platform

Other information
- Status: Unstaffed
- Website: Official website

History
- Opened: June 12, 1918

Services
Preceding station	JR East	Following station
Kami-Sugaya towards Mito	Suigun Line	Urizura towards Kōriyama
Location
- Location within Ibaraki Prefecture Location within Japan

Hitachi-Kōnosu Station (常陸鴻巣駅, Hitachi-Kōnosu-eki) is a passenger railway station in the city of Naka, Ibaraki, Japan operated by East Japan Railway Company (JR East).

== Lines ==
Hitachi-Kōnosu Station is served by the Suigun Line, and is located 13.4 rail kilometers from the official starting point of the line at Mito Station.

== Station layout ==
The station consists of a single side platform serving traffic in both directions. The station is unattended.

== History ==
Hitachi-Kōnosu Station opened on June 12, 1918 as a station on the Mito Railway which was nationalized on December 1, 1927. The station was absorbed into the JR East network upon the privatization of the Japanese National Railways (JNR) on April 1, 1987.

== Surrounding area ==
- Kiuchi Brewing Company

== See also ==
- List of railway stations in Japan
