= Naka, Ibaraki =

Naka 那珂市
- City
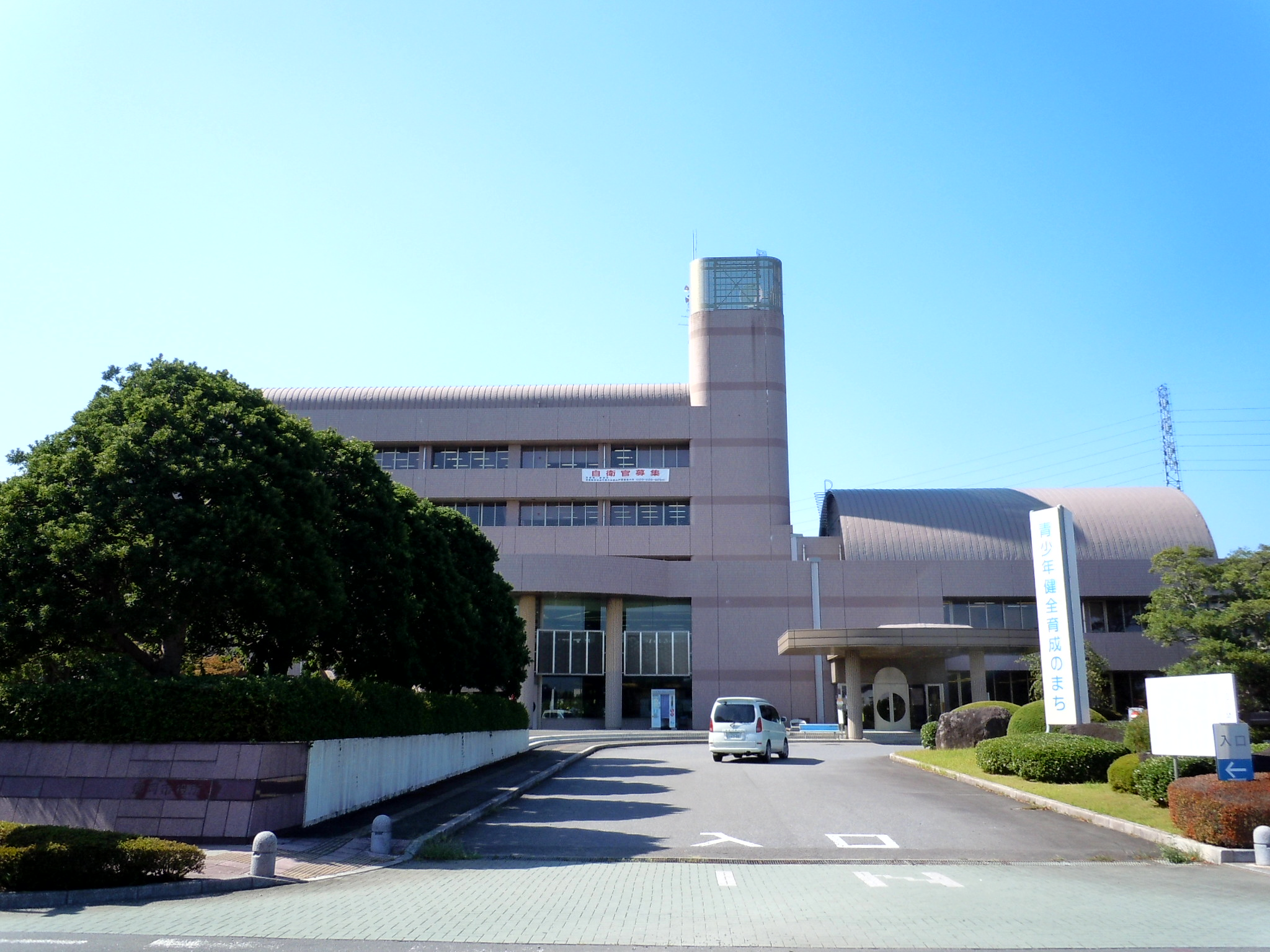
- Naka city hall

- Flag Emblem

- Location of Naka in Ibaraki Prefecture

- Coordinates: 36°27′26.6″N 140°29′12.3″E
- Country: Japan
- Region: Kantō
- Prefecture: Ibaraki

Area
  - Total: 97.82 km^{2} (37.77 sq mi)

Population (September 1, 2020)
  - Total: 53,137
  - Density: 543.2/km^{2} (1,407/sq mi)
- Time zone: UTC+9 (Japan Standard Time)
- Tree: Sakura
- Flower: Sunflower
- Bird: Swan
- Phone number: 029-298-1111
- Address: Fukuda 1819-5, Naka-shi, Ibaraki 311-0192
- Website: Official website

Naka (那珂市, Naka-shi) is a city located in Ibaraki Prefecture, Japan. As of 1 July 2020, the city had an estimated population of 53,153 in 20,953 households and a population density of 543.4 persons per km^{2}. The percentage of the population aged over 65 was 32.4%. The total area of the city is 97.82 square kilometres (37.77 sq mi).

== Geography ==
Naka is located in north-central Ibaraki Prefecture, with the Naka River and Kuji River flowing through the city.

=== Surrounding municipalities ===
Ibaraki Prefecture

- Hitachi
- Hitachinaka
- Hitachiōmiya
- Hitachiōta
- Mito
- Shirosato
- Tōkai

== Demographics ==
Per Japanese census data, the population of Naka peaked around the year 2000 and has declined slightly since.

Historical population
Year	Pop.	±%
1920	38,559	—
1930	37,829	−1.9%
1940	37,718	−0.3%
1950	38,427	+1.9%
1960	37,544	−2.3%
1970	38,256	+1.9%
1980	44,768	+17.0%
1990	51,078	+14.1%
2000	55,069	+7.8%
2010	54,240	−1.5%
2020	53,502	−1.4%

== History ==
On March 31, 1955 the town of Sugaya and villages of Godai, Nakata, Kanzaki, Toda, Yoshino and Kizaki were merged to become the town of Naka (within Naka District). The town was the 4th largest population within the prefecture, following the town of Kamisu (from Kashima District), the town of Sōwa (from Sashima District), and the town of Ami (from Inashiki District).

On January 21, 2005 Naka absorbed the town of Urizura (from Naka District) to become the city of Naka.

== Government ==
Naka has a mayor-council form of government with a directly elected mayor and a unicameral city council of 18 members. Naka contributes one member to the Ibaraki Prefectural Assembly. In terms of national politics, the city is part of Ibaraki 4th district of the lower house of the Diet of Japan.

== Economy ==
Kiuchi Brewery (木内酒造) is a brewery in Naka. It was established in 1823 as a sake and Shōchū producer.

Renesas Electronics has a 300mm fab in Naka, Ibaraki prefecture. This semiconductor factory makes chips for the automotive manufacturing industry.

== Education ==
Naka has nine public elementary schools and five public middle schools operated by the city government, and two public high schools operated by the Ibaraki Prefectural Board of Education. The Ibaraki Women's Junior College is also located in Naka.

== Transportation ==
=== Railway ===
JR East – Suigun Line

- Godai - Shimo-Sugaya - Naka-Sugaya - Kami-Sugaya - Hitachi-Kōnosu - Urizura - Shizu

JR East – Suigun Line - Hitachi-Ōta Branch

- Kami-Sugaya - Minami-Sakaide - Nukada

=== Highway ===
- Jōban Expressway – Naka Interchange
- National Route 6
- National Route 118
- National Route 249

== Sister and friendly cities ==
- Oak Ridge, Tennessee, United States
- Tainan, Taiwan

== Local attractions ==
- Ibaraki Botanical Garden
- The Japan Atomic Energy Agency operates a fusion power research facility in the town, which houses the JT-60, one of the premiere tokamak fusion reactors in the world.
- Kasamatsu Park and Stadium
- Kiuchi Brewery
- Shizu Jinja
- Shizumine Furusato Park
