= Suigun Line =

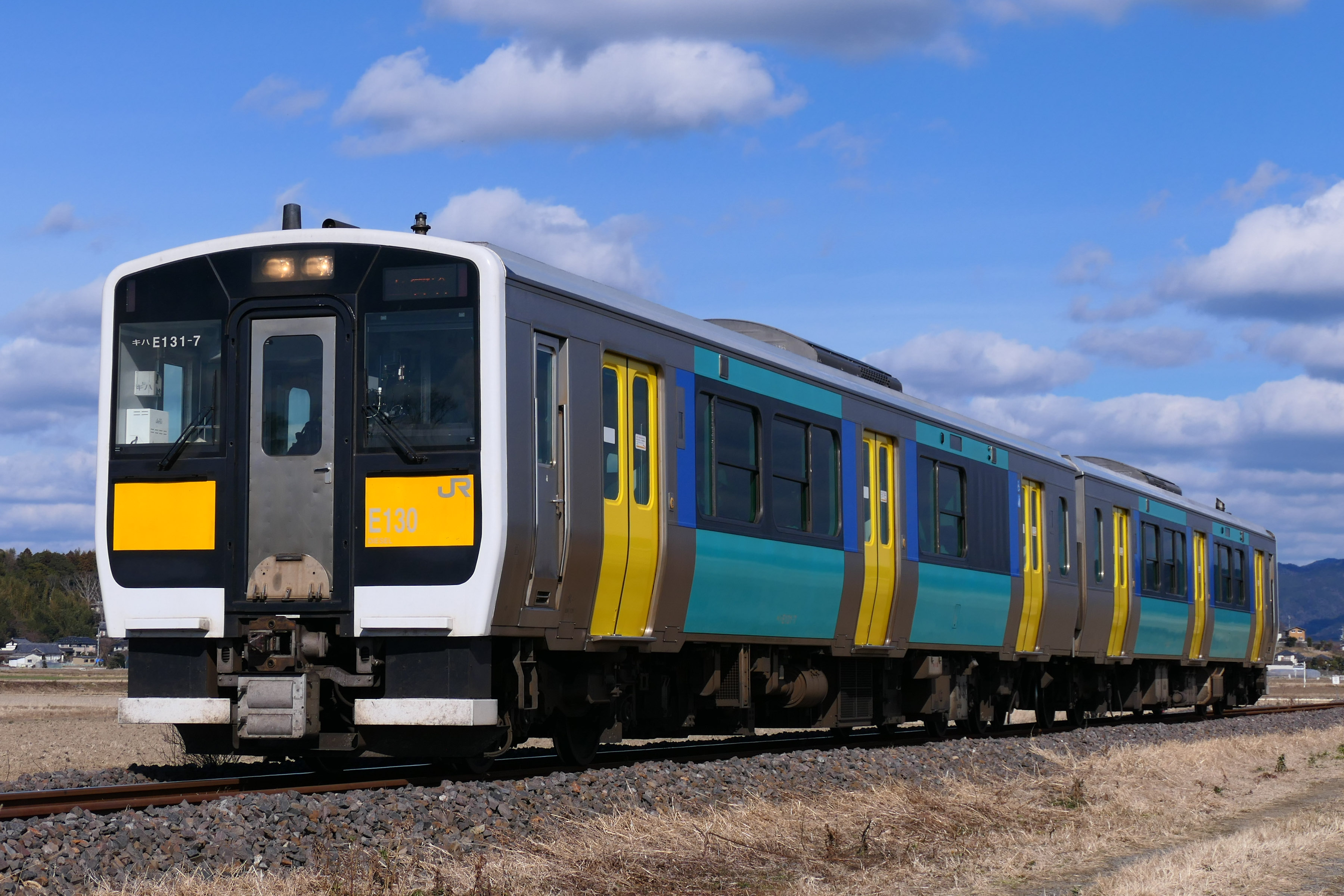
- KiHa E130 series DMU on the Suigun Line

Overview
- Native name: 水郡線
- Status: In operation
- Owner: JR East
- Locale: Ibaraki, Fukushima prefectures
- Termini: Mito; Asaka-Nagamori
- Stations: 45

Service
- Type: Heavy rail
- Services: 2
- Operator(s): JR East
- Rolling stock: KiHa E130 series DMU

History
- Opened: November 16, 1897; 128 years ago

Technical
- Line length: 137.5 km (85.4 mi) (main line), 9.5 km (5.9 mi) (Hitachi-Ōta branch)
- Track length: 147.0 km (91.3 mi)
- Number of tracks: Entire line single tracked
- Character: Rural
- Track gauge: 1,067 mm (3 ft 6 in)
- Electrification: None
- Operating speed: 95 km/h (59 mph)
Route map

The Suigun Line (水郡線, Suigun-sen) is a Japanese railway line operated by East Japan Railway Company (JR East), which connects Mito Station in Ibaraki Prefecture and Asaka-Nagamori Station in Fukushima Prefecture, Japan. All trains on the line continue onto the Tōhoku Main Line to Kōriyama Station. The name of the line includes one kanji from each of the terminals, Mito (水戸) and Kōriyama (郡山).

A branch line runs from Kami-Sugaya Station to Hitachi-Ōta Station in Ibaraki Prefecture.

== History ==
The Ota Railway Co. opened the Mito - Kami-Sugaya - Hitachi-Ota line between 1897 and 1899, but was declared bankrupt in 1901. The 15 banks owed money formed the Mito Railway Co. to acquire the line and continue its operation. That company opened the Kami-Sugaya - Hitachi-Omiya section in 1918, resulting in the Kami-Sugaya - Hitachi-Ota line becoming the branch. The mainline was extended to Hitachi-Daigo in sections between 1922 and 1927, the year the company was nationalised.

In 1929 JGR opened the Asaka-Nagamori - Yatagawa section, extending it to Kawahighashi in 1931. The Hitachi-Daigo - Iwaki-Tanakura section was opened in stages between 1930 and 1932, and the Kawahigashi - Iwaki-Tanakura section opened in 1934, completing the line.

Freight services ceased between 1982 and 1987. CTC signalling was commissioned on the entire line in 1983.

On 13 October 2019 as a result of heavy rainfall from Typhoon Hagibis, a bridge over the Kuji River was destroyed. A substitute bus service operated between Saigane and Hitachi-Daigo station. JR East announced that the bridge repairs would take until November 2020 at the earliest, but the section did not reopen until 27 March 2021.

=== Former connecting lines ===
- Iwaki-Tanakura station - A 23 km line to Shirakawa (on the Tohoku Main Line) was opened by the Shirotana Railway Co. in 1916. The line was nationalised in 1941, and closed in 1944. Plans to reopen the line in 1953 resulted in a decision to convert the line to a dedicated busway, which opened in 1957.
- Hitachi-Ota station - An 11 km line to Omika (on the Joban Line) was opened by the Johoku Electric Railway in 1928/29. In 1944 the company merged with the Hitachi Electric Railway, and a 7 km line to Akukawa was opened in 1947. Both lines were electrified at 600 VDC from opening. CTC signalling was commissioned in 1969, and in 1971 the lines became the first electric railway in Japan converted to one-person operation. Both lines closed in 2005.

== Basic data ==
- Track: Single track
- Electrification: None
- Signalling: Automatic Train Control (ATS-Sn)
- CTC: Mito Operations Center

== Services ==
There is generally one train every one to two hours, but between Mito and Kami-Sugaya this increases to one to two trains per hour. Only 13 trains per day run the entire length of the line; most services are from Mito to Hitachi-Ōmiya, to Hitachi-Daigo, and to Hitachi-Ōta. Between Hitachi-Daigo and Kōriyama there are few trains, with a period of 2–3 hours during midday having no services whatsoever.

There are three additional trains between Hitachi-Daigo and Kōriyama (two to Kōriyama, one to Hitachi-Daigo), a single round-trip to Kōriyama from Iwaki-Ishikawa and back, and a single evening trip from Kōriyama to Iwaki-Tanakura that proceeds to Mito the following morning.

Other seasonal trains are added on certain days throughout the year.

== Stations ==
- All stations on the main line and branch line are served by local trains only.

=== Main Line ===
| Station | Japanese | Distance (km) | | Transfers | | Location | |
| Station | Japanese | Between stations | Total | Transfers | | Location | |
|---|---|---|---|---|---|---|---|
| Mito | 水戸 | - | 0.0 | ■ Jōban Line ■ Ōarai Kashima Line | ∨ | Mito | Ibaraki |
| Hitachi-Aoyagi | 常陸青柳 | 1.9 | 1.9 | | ◇ | Hitachinaka | Ibaraki |
| Hitachi-Tsuda | 常陸津田 | 2.2 | 4.1 | | ｜ | Hitachinaka | Ibaraki |
| Godai | 後台 | 2.4 | 6.5 | | ｜ | Naka | Ibaraki |
| Shimo-Sugaya | 下菅谷 | 1.3 | 7.8 | | ◇ | Naka | Ibaraki |
| Naka-Sugaya | 中菅谷 | 1.2 | 9.0 | | ｜ | Naka | Ibaraki |
| Kami-Sugaya | 上菅谷 | 1.1 | 10.1 | ■ Hitachi-Ōta Branch Line | ◇ | Naka | Ibaraki |
| Hitachi-Kōnosu | 常陸鴻巣 | 3.3 | 13.4 | | ｜ | Naka | Ibaraki |
| Urizura | 瓜連 | 3.3 | 16.7 | | ◇ | Naka | Ibaraki |
| Shizu | 静 | 1.4 | 18.1 | | ｜ | Naka | Ibaraki |
| Hitachi-Ōmiya | 常陸大宮 | 5.3 | 23.4 | | ◇ | Hitachiōmiya | Ibaraki |
| Tamagawamura | 玉川村 | 5.4 | 28.8 | | ◇ | Hitachiōmiya | Ibaraki |
| Nogamihara | 野上原 | 3.7 | 32.5 | | ｜ | Hitachiōmiya | Ibaraki |
| Yamagatajuku | 山方宿 | 2.7 | 35.2 | | ◇ | Hitachiōmiya | Ibaraki |
| Naka-Funyū | 中舟生 | 2.7 | 37.9 | | ｜ | Hitachiōmiya | Ibaraki |
| Shimo-Ogawa | 下小川 | 2.8 | 40.7 | | ◇ | Hitachiōmiya | Ibaraki |
| Saigane | 西金 | 3.4 | 44.1 | | ｜ | Daigo, Kuji District | Ibaraki |
| Kami-Ogawa | 上小川 | 3.2 | 47.3 | | ◇ | Daigo, Kuji District | Ibaraki |
| Fukuroda | 袋田 | 4.5 | 51.8 | | ｜ | Daigo, Kuji District | Ibaraki |
| Hitachi-Daigo | 常陸大子 | 3.8 | 55.6 | | ◇ | Daigo, Kuji District | Ibaraki |
| Shimonomiya | 下野宮 | 6.4 | 62.0 | | ｜ | Daigo, Kuji District | Ibaraki |
| Yamatsuriyama | 矢祭山 | 4.9 | 66.9 | | ｜ | Yamatsuri, Higashishirakawa District | Fukushima |
| Higashidate | 東館 | 4.1 | 71.0 | | ◇ | Yamatsuri, Higashishirakawa District | Fukushima |
| Minami-Ishii | 南石井 | 2.8 | 73.8 | | ｜ | Yamatsuri, Higashishirakawa District | Fukushima |
| Iwaki-Ishii | 磐城石井 | 1.1 | 74.9 | | ｜ | Yamatsuri, Higashishirakawa District | Fukushima |
| Iwaki-Hanawa | 磐城塙 | 6.4 | 81.3 | | ◇ | Hanawa, Higashishirakawa District | Fukushima |
| Chikatsu | 近津 | 5.1 | 86.4 | | ｜ | Tanagura, Higashishirakawa District | Fukushima |
| Nakatoyo | 中豊 | 2.4 | 88.8 | | ｜ | Tanagura, Higashishirakawa District | Fukushima |
| Iwaki-Tanakura | 磐城棚倉 | 1.7 | 90.5 | ■ Hakuhō Line (busstitution) | ◇ | Tanagura, Higashishirakawa District | Fukushima |
| Iwaki-Asakawa | 磐城浅川 | 6.5 | 97.0 | | ◇ | Asakawa, Ishikawa District | Fukushima |
| Satoshiraishi | 里白石 | 3.0 | 100.0 | | ｜ | Asakawa, Ishikawa District | Fukushima |
| Iwaki-Ishikawa | 磐城石川 | 5.3 | 105.3 | | ◇ | Ishikawa, Ishikawa District | Fukushima |
| Nogisawa | 野木沢 | 4.8 | 110.1 | | ｜ | Ishikawa, Ishikawa District | Fukushima |
| Kawabeoki | 川辺沖 | 2.5 | 112.6 | | ｜ | Tamakawa, Ishikawa District | Fukushima |
| Izumigō | 泉郷 | 2.7 | 115.3 | | ｜ | Tamakawa, Ishikawa District | Fukushima |
| Kawahigashi | 川東 | 6.9 | 122.2 | | ◇ | Sukagawa | Fukushima |
| Oshioe | 小塩江 | 3.8 | 126.0 | | ｜ | Sukagawa | Fukushima |
| Yatagawa | 谷田川 | 2.9 | 128.9 | | ◇ | Kōriyama | Fukushima |
| Iwaki-Moriyama | 磐城守山 | 3.2 | 132.1 | | ｜ | Kōriyama | Fukushima |
| Asaka-Nagamori | 安積永盛 | 5.4 | 137.5 | ■ Tōhoku Main Line (for Kuroiso) | ∧ | Kōriyama | Fukushima |
Although the Suigun Line officially ends at Asaka-Nagamori Station, all trains arriving at this station continue to Kōriyama Station, traveling a short stretch within the Tōhoku Main Line.
| Kōriyama | 郡山 | 4.9 | - | Tōhoku Shinkansen ■ Tōhoku Main Line (for Fukushima) ■ Ban'etsu East Line ■ Ban'etsu West Line); Yamagata Shinkansen | ∥ | Kōriyama | Fukushima |

=== Hitachi-Ōta Branch ===
| Station | Japanese | Distance from Kami-Sugaya (km) | | Transfers | Location | |
| Station | Japanese | Between stations | Total | Transfers | Location | |
|---|---|---|---|---|---|---|
| Kami-Sugaya | 上菅谷 | - | 0.0 | ■ Suigun Line (Main Line) | Naka | Ibaraki |
| Minami-Sakaide | 南酒出 | 2.5 | 2.5 | | Naka | Ibaraki |
| Nukada | 額田 | 1.1 | 3.6 | | Naka | Ibaraki |
| Kawai | 河合 | 3.1 | 6.7 | | Hitachiōta | Ibaraki |
| Yagawara | 谷河原 | 1.5 | 8.2 | | Hitachiōta | Ibaraki |
| Hitachi-Ōta | 常陸太田 | 1.3 | 9.5 | | Hitachiōta | Ibaraki |

Passing information

- Double-tracked section: "∥"
- Passing loops: "◇", "∨", "^"
- No passing loops: "｜"

== Rolling stock ==
- KiHa E130 series DMUs (since January 2007)

=== Past ===
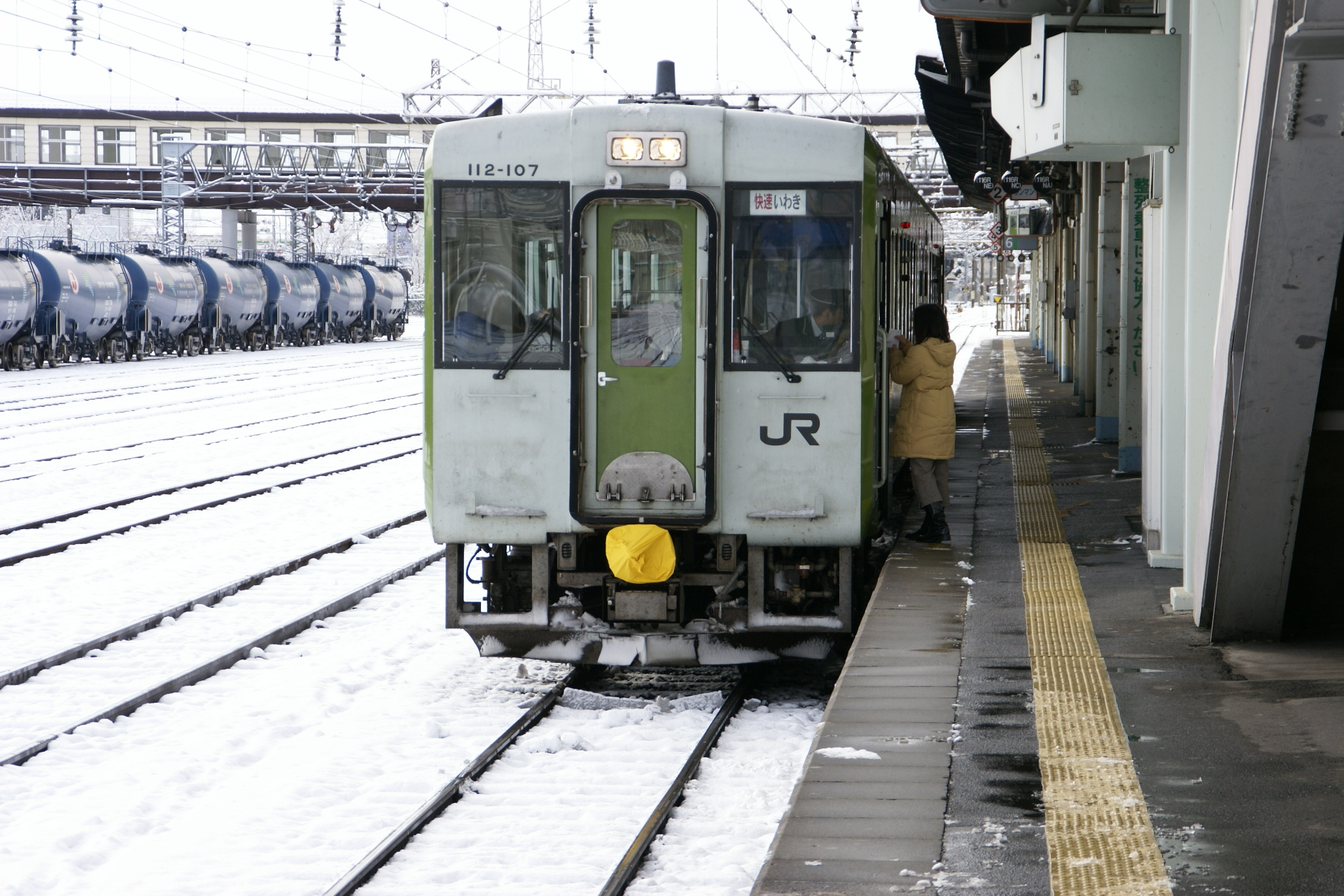
KiHa 110 series DMU at Kōriyama Station, January 2008

- KiHa 110 series DMUs (from March 1992 until September 2007)
- KiHa 58 DMUs
- KiHa 40 DMUs
- KiHa 28 DMUs
- KiHa 20 DMUs
- JNR Class DE10 diesel-hauled trains
