= Ibaraki Women's Junior College =

Private women's junior college in Naka, Ibaraki, Japan

Coordinates: 36°25′24.3″N 140°28′25″E

- 茨城女子短期大学
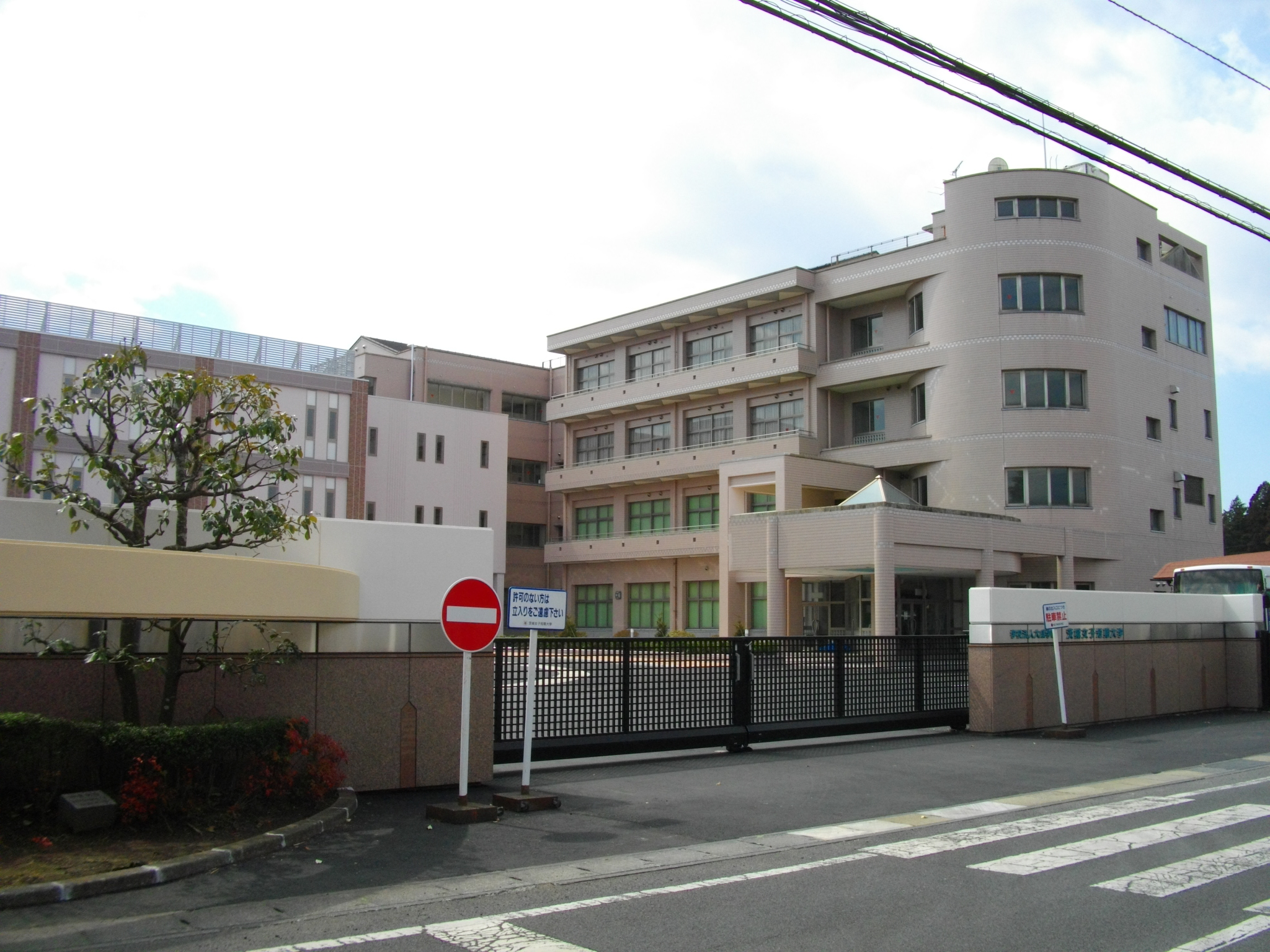
- Type: Private
- Established: 1967
- Location: Naka, Ibaraki, Japan
- Website: Official website

Ibaraki Women's Junior College (茨城女子短期大学, Ibaraki joshi tanki daigaku) is a private women's junior college in Naka, Ibaraki, Japan, established in 1967. The predecessor of the school was founded in 1907.
