= Hitachiōta =

Hitachiōta 常陸太田市
- City
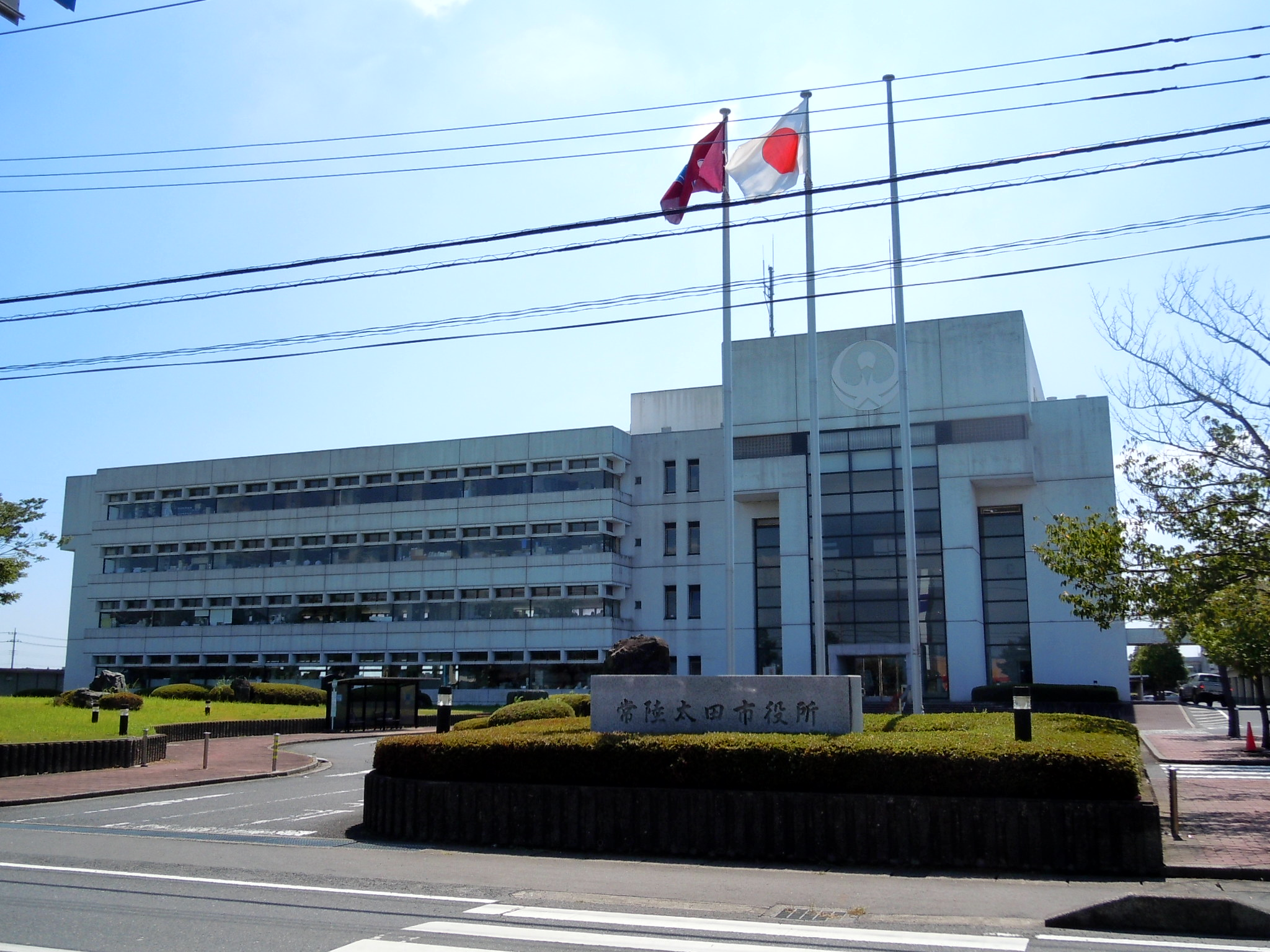
- Hitachiōta city hall

- Flag Seal

- Location of Hitachiōta in Ibaraki Prefecture

- Coordinates: 36°32′17.8″N 140°31′51.3″E
- Country: Japan
- Region: Kantō
- Prefecture: Ibaraki

Government
  - Mayor: Kenji Fujita (from May 2025) )

Area
  - Total: 371.99 km^{2} (143.63 sq mi)

Population (September 2020)
  - Total: 47,922
  - Density: 128.83/km^{2} (333.66/sq mi)
- Time zone: UTC+9 (Japan Standard Time)
- Tree: Zelkova serrata
- Flower: Kerria japonica
- Bird: Alcedo atthis
- Phone number: 0294-72-3111
- Address: 3690 Kanai-chō, Hitachiōta-shi, Ibaraki-ken 313-8611
- Website: Official website

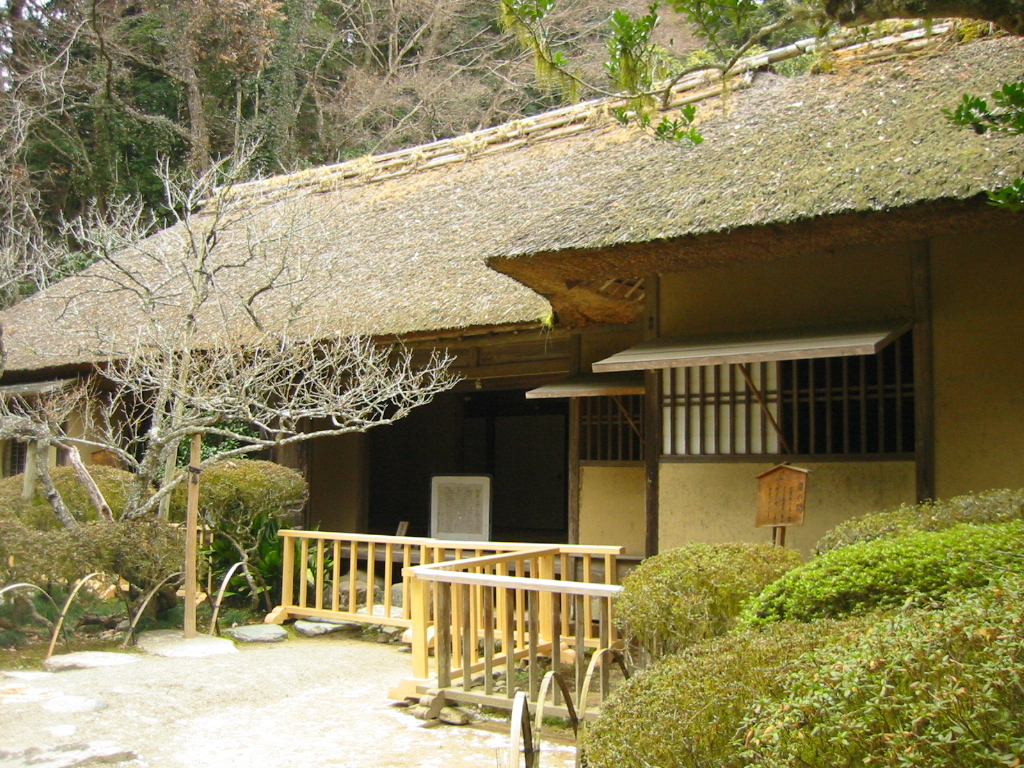
Seizan-so

Hitachiōta (常陸太田市, Hitachiōta-shi) is a city located in Ibaraki Prefecture, Japan. As of 1 July 2020, the city had an estimated population of 48,074 in 19,327 households and a population density of 129.2 persons per km^{2}. The percentage of the population aged over 65 was 36.2%. The total area of the city is 371.99 square kilometres (143.63 sq mi).

== Geography ==
Hitachiōta is located in northeastern Ibaraki Prefecture, bordered by Fukushima Prefecture to the north. The city is long from north to south, and has the largest area of any municipality in Ibaraki prefecture. From the west, the Asakawa, Yamada, and Sato rivers flow in parallel to the south, and the villages and cultivated lands are spread in the valleys along each river. The rivers all join the Kuji River, which runs through the southern border of the city.

=== Surrounding municipalities ===
Fukushima Prefecture

- Hanawa
- Yamatsuri

Ibaraki Prefecture

- Daigo
- Hitachi
- Hitachiōmiya
- Naka
- Takahagi

=== Climate ===
Hitachiōta has a humid subtropical climate (Köppen Cfa) characterized by warm summers and cold winters with heavy snowfall. The average annual temperature in Hitachiōta is 13.9 °C. The average annual rainfall is 1426 mm with September as the wettest month. The temperatures are highest on average in August, at around 25.2 °C, and lowest in January, at around 3.6 °C.

== Demographics ==
Per Japanese census data, the population of Hitachiōta peaked in the 1950s and has declined since.

Historical population
Year	Pop.	±%
1920	60,513	—
1930	63,439	+4.8%
1940	63,066	−0.6%
1950	77,767	+23.3%
1960	72,593	−6.7%
1970	63,141	−13.0%
1980	59,503	−5.8%
1990	59,758	+0.4%
2000	61,869	+3.5%
2010	56,250	−9.1%
2020	48,602	−13.6%

== History ==
The town of Ōta was established with the creation of the modern municipalities system on April 1, 1889. It was raised to city status on July 15, 1954. On December 1, 2004, the town of Kanasagō, and the villages of Satomi and Suifu (all from Kuji District) were merged into Hitachiōta, more than tripling its size and increasing its population by about 20,000.

== Government ==
Hitachiōta has a mayor-council form of government with a directly elected mayor and a unicameral city council of 18 members. Hitachiōta contributes two members to the Ibaraki Prefectural Assembly. In terms of national politics, the city is part of Ibaraki 4th district of the lower house of the Diet of Japan.

== Economy ==
The economy of Hitachiōta is primarily agricultural.

== Education ==
Hitachiōta has 12 public elementary schools and five public middle schools operated by the city government, and three public high schools operated by the Ibaraki Prefectural Board of Education.

== Transportation ==
=== Railway ===
JR East – Suigun Line

- Kawai - Yagawara - Hitachi-Ōta

=== Highway ===
- Jōban Expressway – Hitachi-minamiōta Interchange
- National Route 293
- National Route 349
- National Route 461

== Sister cities ==
- Hunchun, Yanbian Korean Autonomous Prefecture, Jilin, China, friendship city
- La Trinidad, Benguet, Philippines, sister city
- Yuyao, Zhejiang, China, friendship city

== Local attractions ==
- Bontenyama Kofun cluster
- site of Ota Castle
- Satake-dera
- Seizan-so, National Historic Monument

== Notable people from Hitachiōta ==
- Miyuki Akiyama, professional volleyball player
- Hiroshi Kajiyama, politician
