= Kami-Sugaya Station =

Railway station in Naka, Ibaraki Prefecture, Japan

Kami-Sugaya Station 上菅谷駅
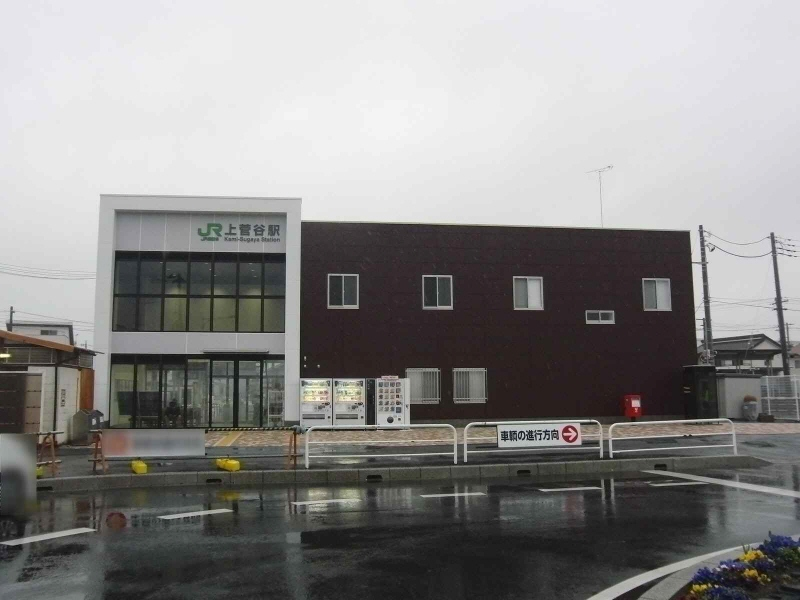
- Kami-Sugaya Station in March 2014

General information
- Location: Sugaya 4496, Naka-shi, Ibaraki-ken 311-0105; Japan
- Coordinates: 36.4556°N 140.4928°E
- Operator: JR East
- Line: ■ Suigun Line
- Distance: 10.1 km from Mito
- Platforms: 1 side + 1 island platform

Other information
- Status: Staffed (Midori no Madoguchi)
- Website: Official website

History
- Opened: November 16, 1896

Passengers
- FY2019: 734

Services
Preceding station	JR East	Following station
Naka-Sugaya towards Mito	Suigun Line	Hitachi-Kōnosu towards Kōriyama
Naka-Sugaya towards Mito	Suigun Line Hitachi-Ōta Branch	Minami-Sakaide towards Hitachi-Ōta
Location
- Location within Ibaraki Prefecture Location within Japan

Kami-Sugaya Station (上菅谷駅, Kami-Sugaya-eki) is a junction passenger railway station in the city of Naka, Ibaraki, Japan operated by East Japan Railway Company (JR East).

== Lines ==
Kami-Sugaya Station is served by the Suigun Line, and is located 10.1 rail kilometers from the official starting point of the line at Mito Station. It is also the terminus for the Hitachi-Ōta spur line on the Suigun Line, connecting Mito with Hitachiōta.

== Station layout ==
The station consists of one side platform and one island platform connected to the station building by a level crossing. The station has a Midori no Madoguchi staffed ticket office.

=== Platforms ===
1	■ Suigun Line	for Mito; Hitachi-Ōta (starting trains)
2	■ Suigun Line	for Hitachi-Ōmiya, Hitachi-Daigo and Kōriyama; Hitachi-Ōta (trains originating at Mito)
3	■ Suigun Line	for Mito; Hitachi-Ōta

== History ==
Kami-Sugaya Station opened on November 16, 1896 as a station on the Ota Railway. The Ota Railway merged with the Mito Railway on October 21, 1901 and was nationalized on December 1, 1927. The station was absorbed into the JR East network upon the privatization of the Japanese National Railways (JNR) on April 1, 1987. A new station building was completed in January 2014.

== Passenger statistics ==
In fiscal 2019, the station was used by an average of 734 passengers daily (boarding passengers only).

== See also ==
- List of railway stations in Japan
