= Japan National Route 348 =

Road in Yamagata prefecture, Japan

National Route 348
- 国道348号

Route information
- Length: 45.3 km (28.1 mi)

Location
- Country: Japan

Highway system
- National highways of Japan; Expressways of Japan
← National Route 347	→ National Route 349

National Route 348 (国道348号, Kokudō Sanbyaku-yonjūhachi-gō) is a highway in Japan on the island of Honshū which runs from Nagai City in Yamagata Prefecture to Yamagata City, in the same prefecture.

== Route description ==
- Length: 45.3 km (28 mi)
- Origin: Nagai City
- Terminus: Yamagata City
- Major cities: Yamagata

=== Municipalities passed through ===
- Yamagata Prefecture
  - Nagai - Shirataka - Nan'yō - Kaminoyama - Yamagata
