= Japan National Route 349 =

Road in Japan

National Route 349
- 国道349号
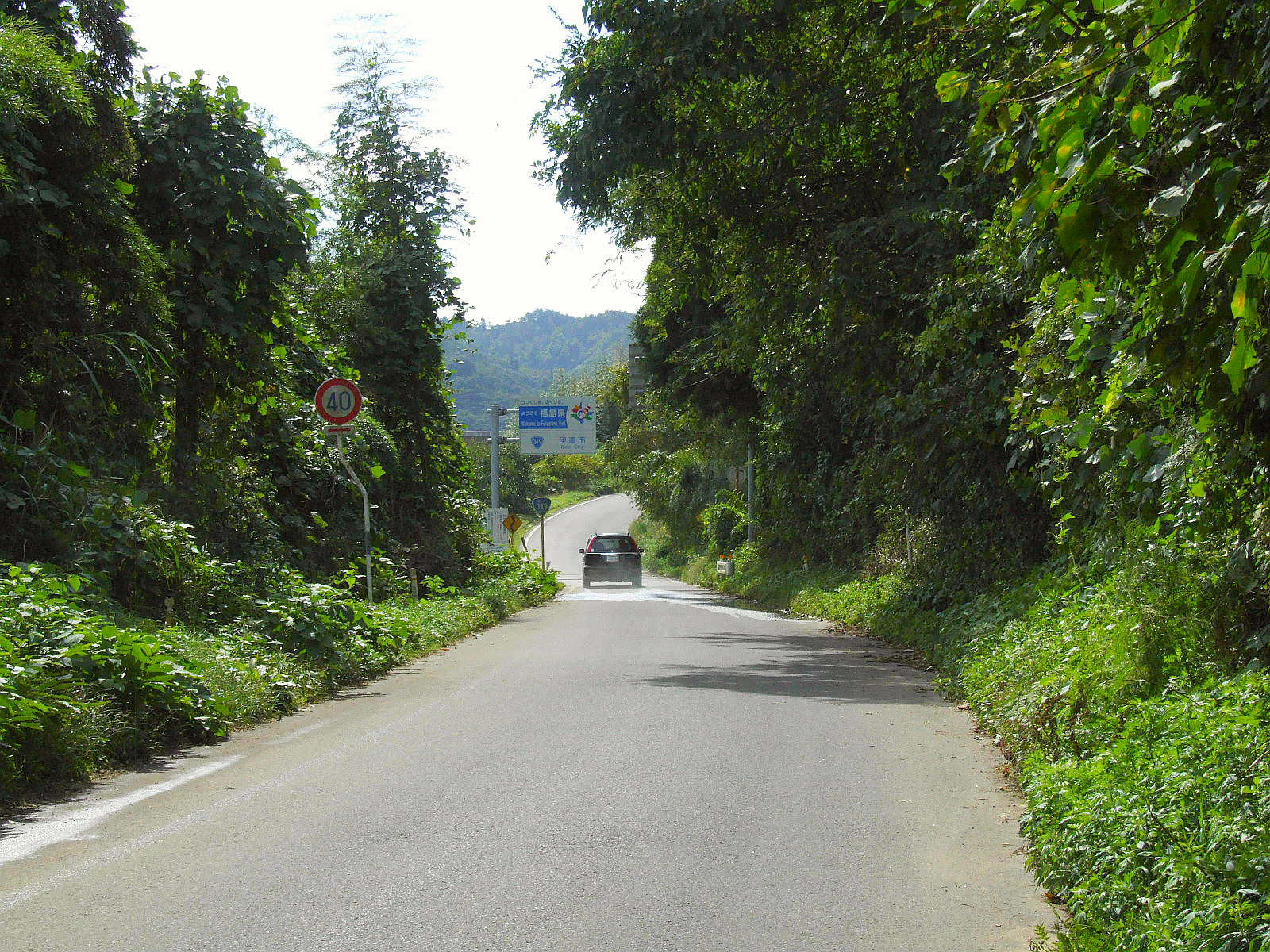

Route information
- Length: 256.3 km (159.3 mi)

Location
- Country: Japan

Highway system
- National highways of Japan; Expressways of Japan
← National Route 348	→ National Route 350

National Route 349 is a national highway of Japan connecting Mito, Ibaraki and Shibata, Miyagi, with a total length of 256.3 km (159.26 mi).
