= Hitachi-Ōta Station =

Railway station in Hitachiota, Ibaraki prefecture, Japan

Hitachi-Ōta Station 常陸太田駅
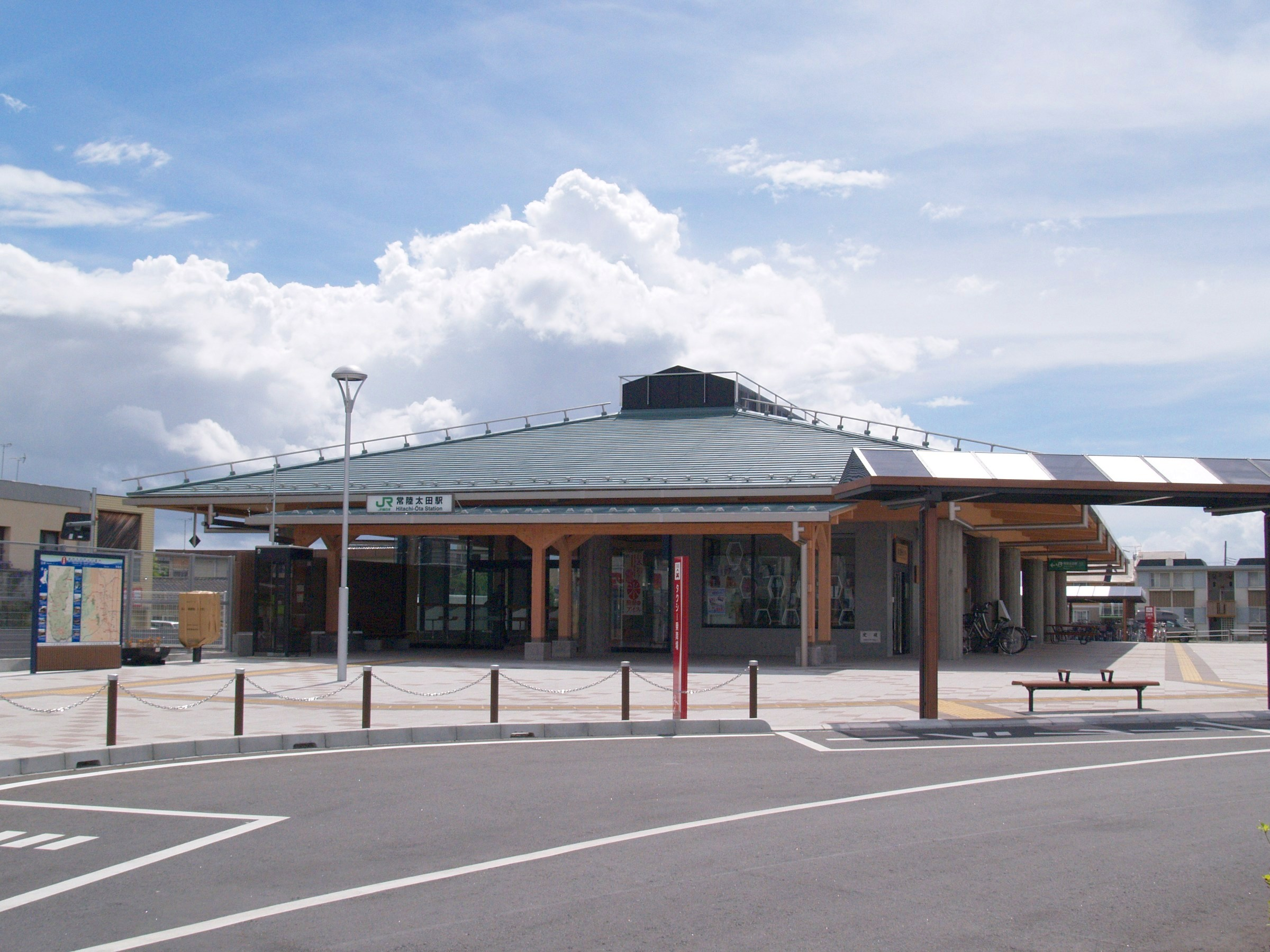
- Hitachi-Ōta Station in September 2011

General information
- Location: Yamashita-cho 1043, Hitachiōta-shi, Ibaraki-ken 313-0013; Japan
- Coordinates: 36.5318°N 140.5270°E
- Operator: JR East
- Line: ■ Suigun Line
- Distance: 9.5 km from Kami-Sugaya
- Platforms: 1 side platform

Other information
- Status: Staffed (Midori no Madoguchi)
- Website: Official website

History
- Opened: April 1, 1899
- Former names: Ōta (until 1927)

Passengers
- FY2019: 1153 daily

Services
Preceding station	JR East	Following station
Yagawara towards Mito	Suigun Line Hitachi-Ōta Branch	Terminus
Location
- Location within Ibaraki Prefecture Location within Japan

Hitachi-Ōta Station (常陸太田駅, Hitachi-Ōta-eki) is a passenger railway station in the city of Hitachiōta, Ibaraki Prefecture, operated by East Japan Railway Company (JR East).

== Lines ==
Hitachi-Ōta Station is a terminus of the Hitachi-Ōta Branch Line of the Suigun Line, and is 9.5 kilometres from the start of the branch line at Kami-Sugaya Station.

== Station layout ==
The station consists of a single dead-headed side platform. The station has a Midori no Madoguchi ticket office.

== History ==
Hitachi-Ōta Station opened on April 1, 1899 as Ōta Station (太田駅) on the Ota Railway. The Ota Railway merged with the Mito Railway on October 21, 1901 and was nationalized on December 1, 1927, and the station was renamed to its present name at that time. The station was absorbed into the JR East network upon the privatization of the Japanese National Railways (JNR) on April 1, 1987. A new station building was completed in April 2011.

== Passenger statistics ==
In fiscal 2019, the station was used by an average of 1153 passengers daily (boarding passengers only).

== Bus routes ==
- Ibaraki Kotsu
  - For Satokawa-iriguchi

== Surrounding area ==
- National Route 293
- National Route 349
- Hitachiōta Post Office

== See also ==
- List of railway stations in Japan
