= Mito Station (Ibaraki) =

Railway station in Mito, Ibaraki Prefecture, Japan

Mito Station 水戸駅
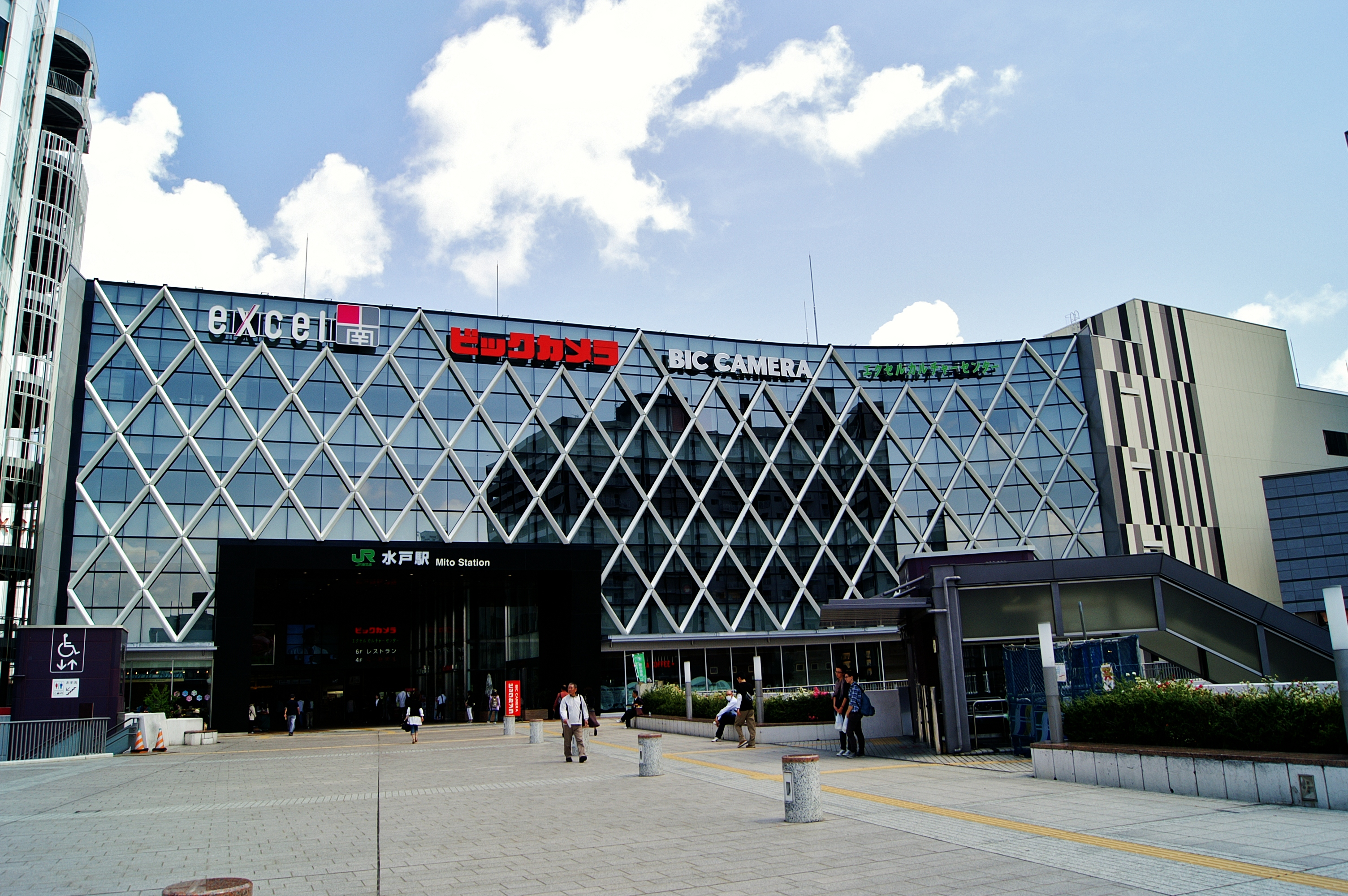
- Mito Station South entrance, May 2012

General information
- Location: 1-1-1 Miyamachi, Mito-shi, Ibaraki-ken 310-0015; Japan
- Coordinates: 36.3711°N 140.4780°E
- Operator: JR East (manager); Kashima Rinkai Tetsudo; JR Freight
- Lines: ■ Jōban Line; ■ Suigun Line; ■ Ōarai-Kashima Line
- Platforms: 8 (4 island platforms)
- Connections: Bus terminal

Construction
- Structure type: At-grade

Other information
- Status: Staffed (Midori no Madoguchi)
- Website: Official website

History
- Opened: 16 January 1889; 137 years ago

Passengers
- FY2019: 29,172 (JR Lines) daily

Services
Preceding station	JR East	Following station
Tsuchiura (limited service) towards Shinagawa	Hitachi	Katsuta towards Sendai
Akatsuka (limited service) towards Shinagawa	Tokiwa	Katsuta towards Takahagi
Akatsuka towards Shinagawa	Jōban Line Local-Futsuu	Katsuta towards Sendai
Akatsuka towards Oyama	Mito Line	Terminus
Terminus	Suigun Line	Hitachi-Aoyagi towards Kōriyama or Hitachi-Ōta
Preceding station	Kashima Rinkai Railway	Following station
Terminus	Ōarai Kashima Line	Higashi-Mito towards Kashimajingū
Seasonal services
Preceding station	JR East	Following station
Kairakuen (limited service, seasonal) One-way operation	Hitachi	Katsuta towards Sendai
Kairakuen (limited service, seasonal) One-way operation	Tokiwa	Katsuta towards Takahagi
Kairakuen (seasonal) One-way operation	Jōban Line Local-Futsuu	Katsuta towards Sendai
Kairakuen (seasonal) One-way operation	Mito Line	Terminus
Location
- Location within Ibaraki Prefecture Location within Japan

Mito Station (水戸駅, Mito-eki) is a joint-use passenger railway station in the city of Mito, Ibaraki, Japan, operated by the East Japan Railway Company (JR East) and the third sector Kashima Rinkai Railway. The station premises are managed by JR East.

== Lines ==
Mito Station is served by the JR East Jōban Line and Suigun Line, and also by the Kashima Rinkai Railway's Ōarai-Kashima Line. It is located 115.3 km from the official starting point of the Jōban Line at Nippori Station and is a terminus of the Suigun Line and of the Ōarai-Kashima Line.

== Station layout ==
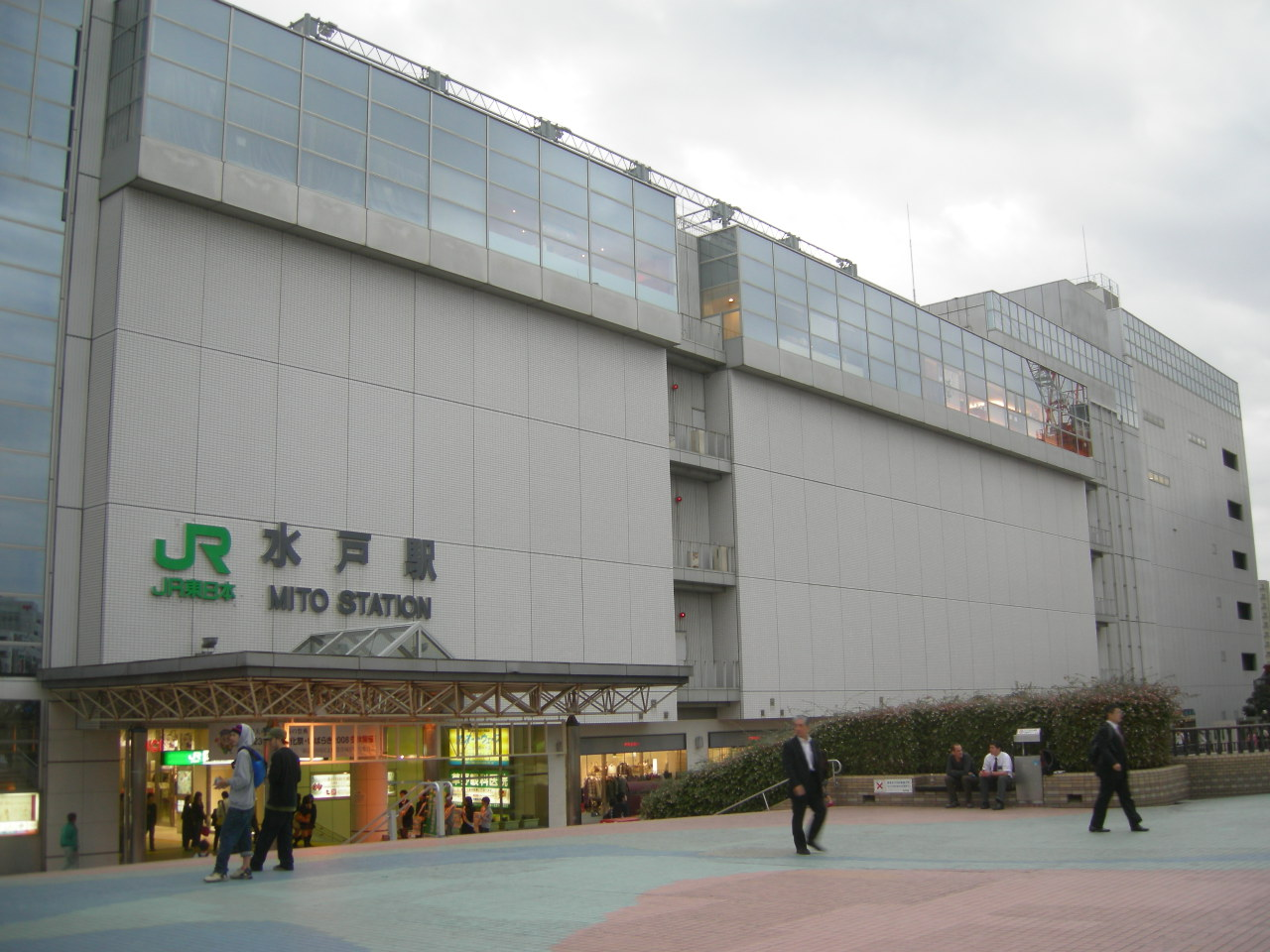
Mito Station north entrance, October 2008

The station consists of four island platforms serving eight tracks. The station has a Midori no Madoguchi staffed ticket office and a "View Plaza" travel agency.

=== Platforms ===
1/2	■ Suigun Line	for Kami-Sugaya, Hitachi-Ōta, Hitachi-Daigo, and Kōriyama
3/4	■ Jōban Line	for Katsuta, Hitachi, Takahagi, Iwaki, Haranomachi and Sendai
5/6	■ Jōban Line ( Ueno-Tokyo Line)	for Tomobe, Ishioka, Tsuchiura, Toride, Ueno, Tokyo and Shinagawa
5/6	■ Mito Line	for Tomobe, Kasama, Shimodate, and Oyama
7	■ Jōban Line Limited Express ( Ueno-Tokyo Line)	for Tomobe, Ishioka, Tsuchiura, Ueno, Tokyo and Shinagawa
8	■ Kashima Rinkai Tetsudo Ōarai-Kashima Line	for Ōarai, Shin-Hokota, and Kashima-Jingu

== History ==
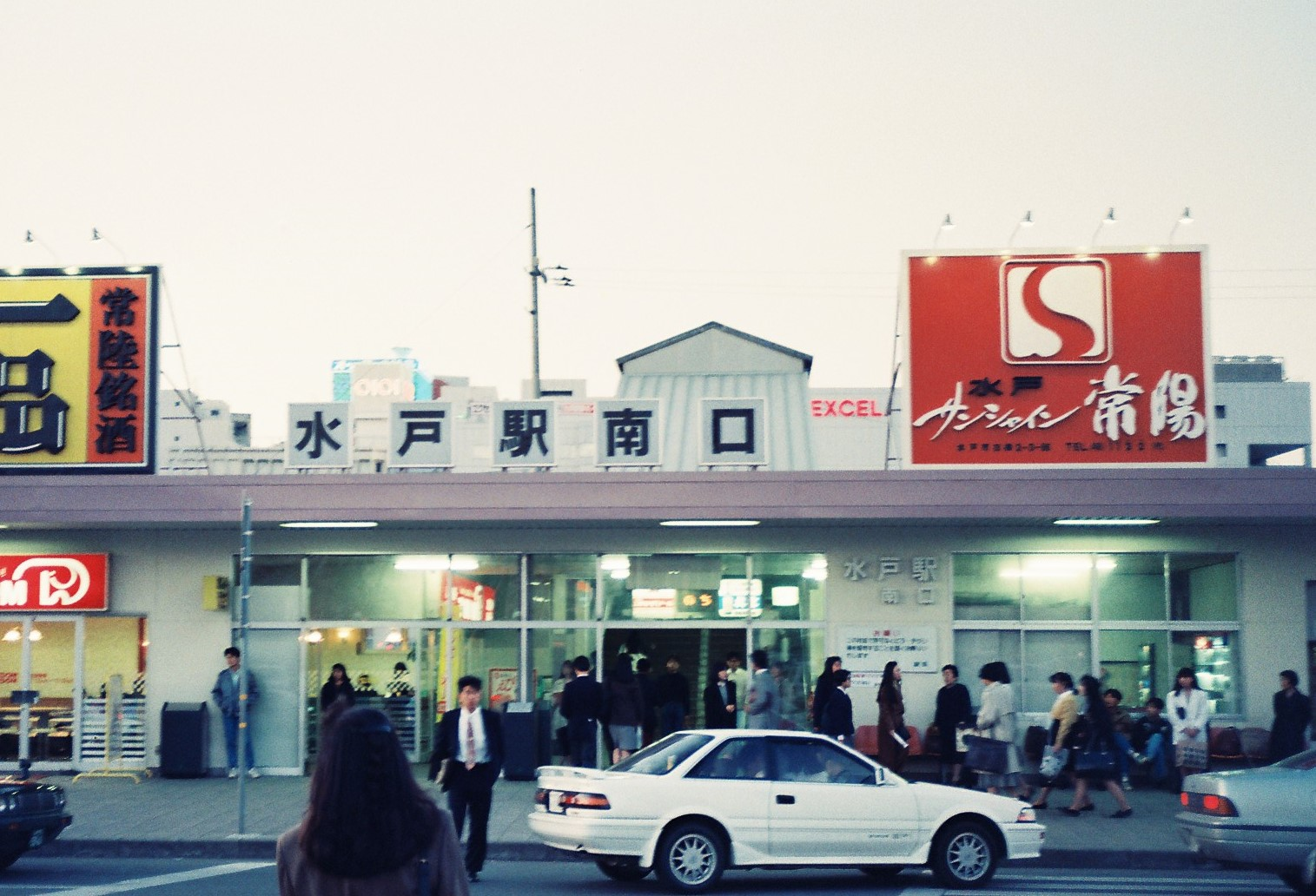
The south entrance in April 1990 before rebuilding

Mito station opened on the Mito Line on 16 January 1889. The Suigun Line opened on 16 November 1897. The station was absorbed into the JR East network upon the privatization of the Japanese National Railways (JNR) on 1 April 1987. A new station building was completed in July 1994.

The Kashima Rinkai Tetsudo Ōarai-Kashima Line opened on 14 March 1985.

== Passenger statistics ==
In fiscal 2019, the JR East portion of the station was used by an average of 29,172 passengers daily (boarding passengers only). In fiscal 2019, the Kashima Rinkai Railway portion of the station was used by an average of 2064 passengers daily.

The passenger figures (boarding passengers only) for previous years are as shown below.

Fiscal year	Daily average
1913	807
1960	27,589
1971	31,085
1984	31,976
2000	30,421
2005	29,216
2010	27,109
2015	29,767

== Surrounding area ==
- Kōdōkan
- Art Tower Mito

== See also ==
- List of railway stations in Japan
