= Kami-Ogawa Station =

Railway station in Daigo, Ibaraki Prefecture, Japan

Kami-Ogawa Station 上小川駅
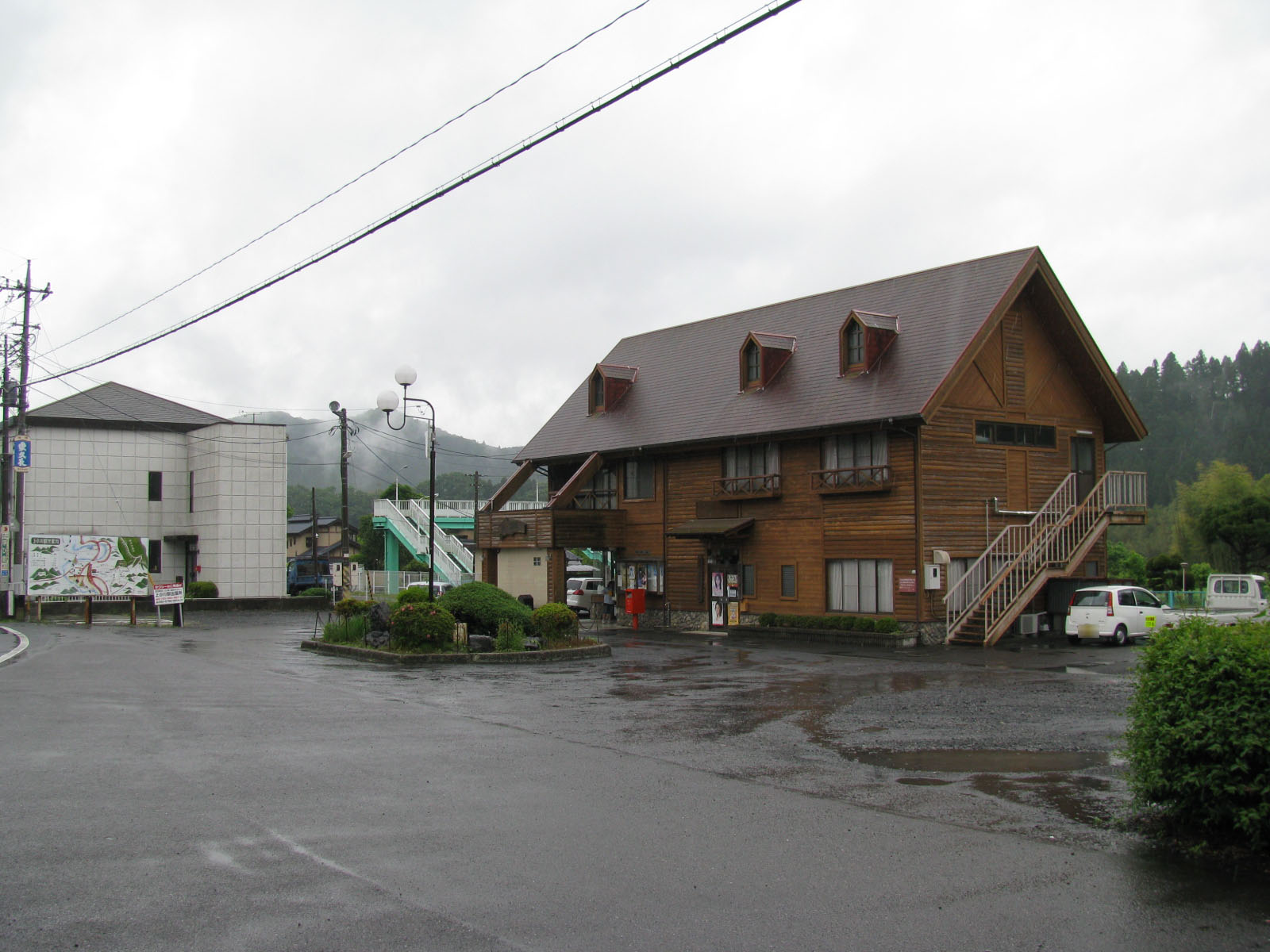
- Kami-Ogawa Station in May 2008

General information
- Location: Korofuji 3528-2, Daigo-machi, Kuji-gun, Ibaraki-ken 319-3361; Japan
- Coordinates: 36°43′10″N 140°22′43″E
- Operator: JR East
- Line: ■ Suigun Line
- Distance: 47.3 km from Mito
- Platforms: 2 side platforms

Other information
- Status: Staffed
- Website: Official website

History
- Opened: August 15, 1925

Passengers
- FY2019: 32 daily

Services
Preceding station	JR East	Following station
Saigane towards Mito	Suigun Line	Fukuroda towards Kōriyama
Location
- Location within Ibaraki Prefecture Location within Japan

Kami-Ogawa Station (上小川駅, Kami-Ogawa-eki) is a passenger railway station in the town of Daigo, Kuji District, Ibaraki Prefecture, operated by East Japan Railway Company (JR East).

== Lines ==
Kami-Ogawa Station is served by the Suigun Line, and is located 47.3 rail kilometers from the official starting point of the line at Mito Station.

== Station layout ==
The station consists of two opposed side platforms connected to the station building by a footbridge. The station is staffed.

=== Platforms ===
1	■ Suigun Line	for Hitachi-Ōmiya and Mito
2	■ Suigun Line	for Hitachi-Daigo and Kōriyama

== History ==
Kami-Ogawa Station opened on August 15, 1925. The station was absorbed into the JR East network upon the privatization of the Japanese National Railways (JNR) on April 1, 1987.

== Passenger statistics ==
In fiscal 2019, the station was used by an average of 32 passengers daily (boarding passengers only).

== Surrounding area ==
- National Route 118
- Kami-Ogawa Post Office
- Kujigawa River

== See also ==
- List of railway stations in Japan
