= Shimo-Ogawa Station =

Railway station in Hitachiōmiya, Ibaraki Prefecture, Japan

Shimo-Ogawa Station 下小川駅
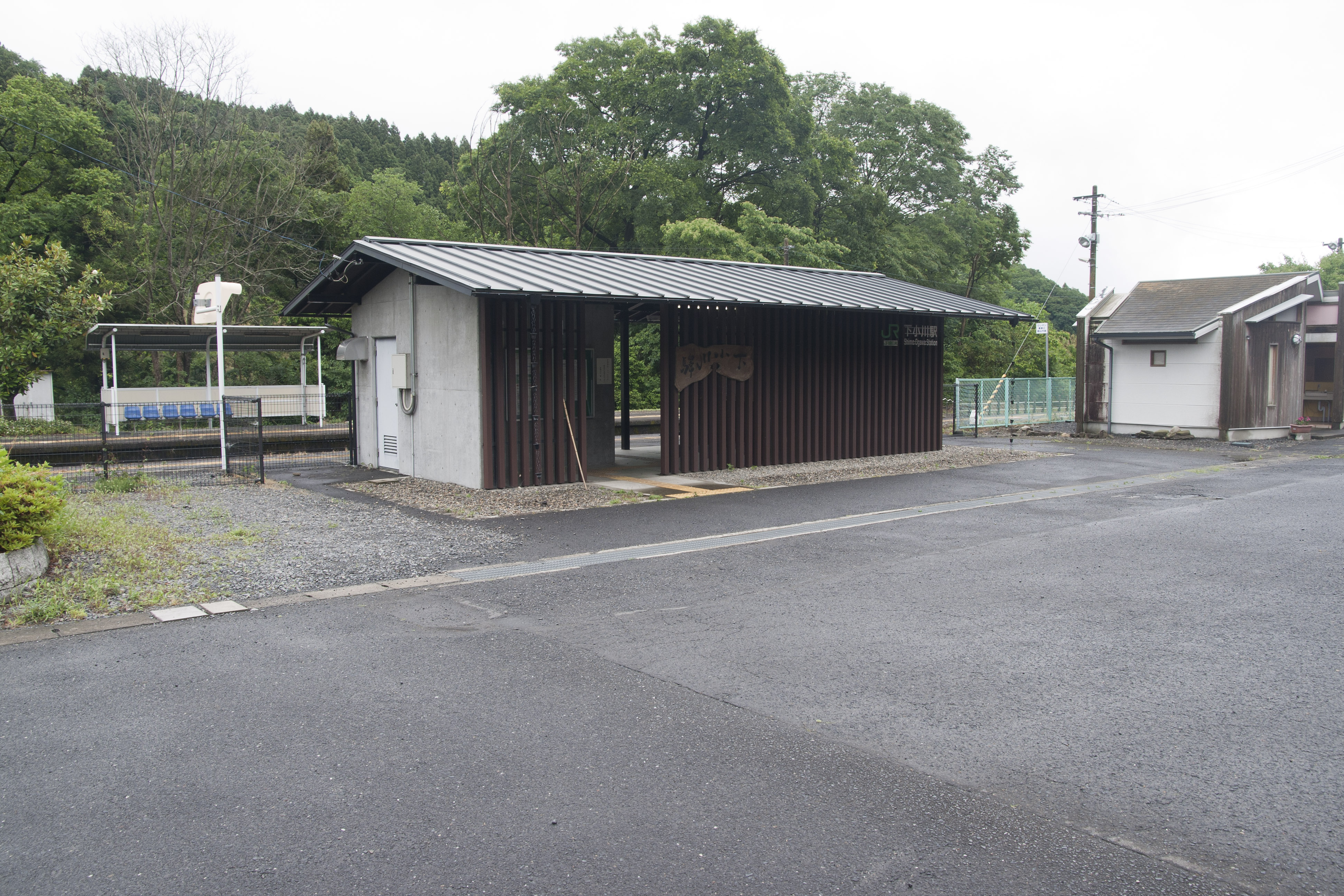
- Shimo-Ogawa Station in June 2016

General information
- Location: 2358 Morikane, Hitachiōmiya-shi, Ibaraki-ken 319-3102; Japan
- Coordinates: 36.6692°N 140.3871°E
- Operator: JR East
- Line: ■ Suigun Line
- Distance: 40.7 km from Mito
- Platforms: 2 side platforms
- Tracks: 2

Other information
- Status: Unstaffed
- Website: Official website

History
- Opened: 15 August 1925
- Rebuilt: 2004

Services
Preceding station	JR East	Following station
Naka-Funyū towards Mito	Suigun Line	Saigane towards Kōriyama
Location
- Location within Ibaraki Prefecture Location within Japan

Shimo-Ogawa Station (下小川駅, Shimo-Ogawa-eki) is a passenger railway station in the city of Hitachiōmiya, Ibaraki, Japan operated by East Japan Railway Company (JR East).

== Lines ==
Shimo-Ogawa Station is served by the Suigun Line, and is located 40.7 kilometers from the official starting point of the line at Mito Station.

== Station layout ==
The station consists of two opposed side platforms connected to the station building by a level crossing. The station is unattended.

=== Platforms ===
1	■ Suigun Line	for Hitachi-Daigo and Kōriyama
2	■ Suigun Line	for Hitachi-Ōmiya and Mito

== History ==
Shimo-Ogawa Station opened on August 15, 1925. The station was absorbed into the JR East network upon the privatization of the Japanese National Railways (JNR) on April 1, 1987. A new station building was completed in 2004.

== Surrounding area ==
- National Route 118
- Kuji River

== See also ==
- List of railway stations in Japan
