= Fukuroda Station =

Railway station in Daigo, Ibaraki Prefecture, Japan

Fukuroda Station 袋田駅
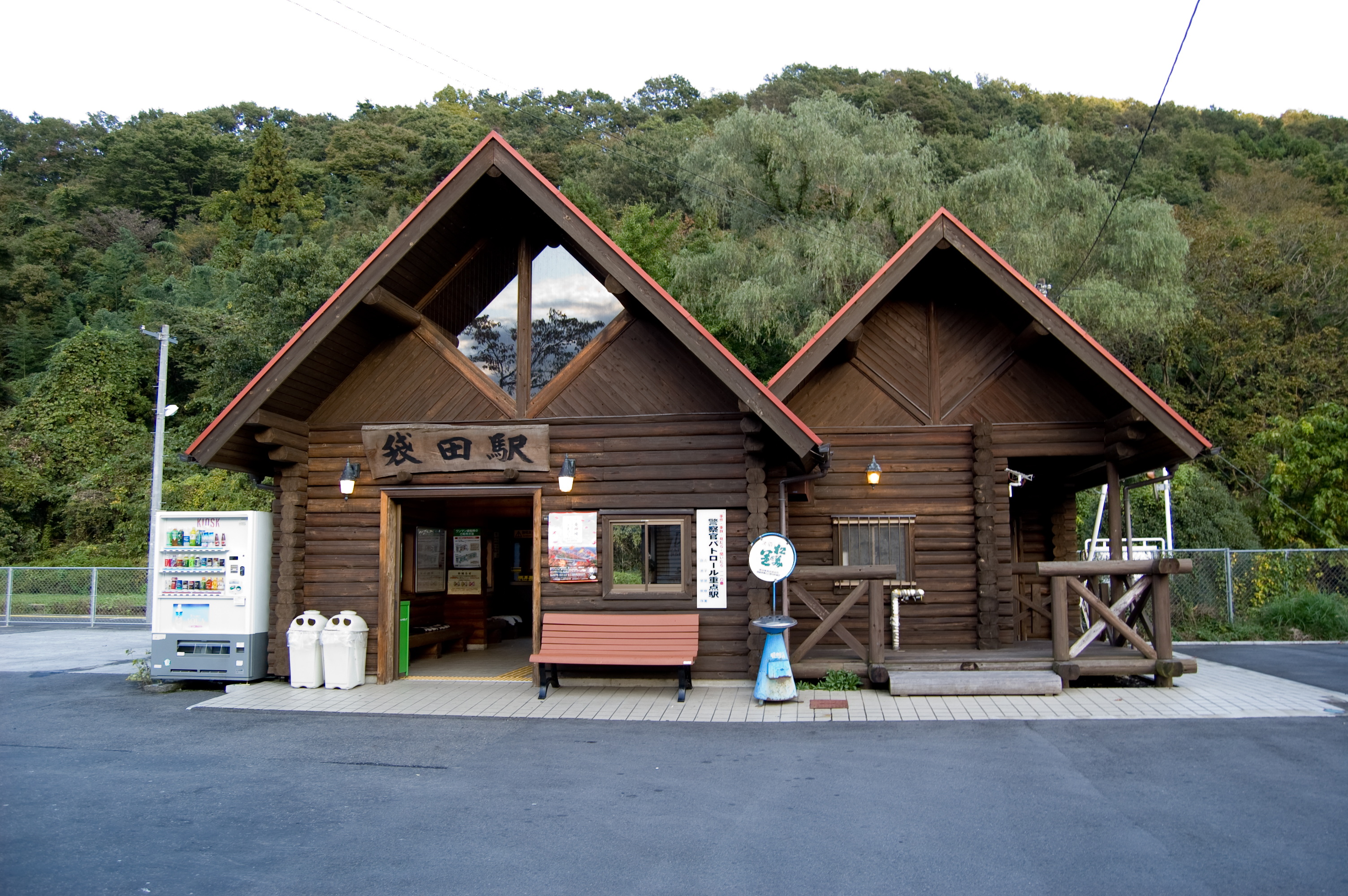
- Fukuroda Station in October 2007

General information
- Location: Fukuroda 1928, Daigo-machi, Kuji-gun, Ibaraki-ken 319-3523; Japan
- Coordinates: 36.7545°N 140.3796°E
- Operator: JR East
- Line: ■ Suigun Line
- Distance: 51.8 km from Mito
- Platforms: 1 side platform

Other information
- Status: Staffed
- Website: Official website

History
- Opened: March 3, 1927

Passengers
- FY2019: 59 daily

Services
Preceding station	JR East	Following station
Kami-Ogawa towards Mito	Suigun Line	Hitachi-Daigo towards Kōriyama
Location
- Location within Ibaraki Prefecture Location within Japan

Fukuroda Station (袋田駅, Fukuroda-eki) is a passenger railway station in the town of Daigo, Kuji District, Ibaraki Prefecture, operated by East Japan Railway Company (JR East).

== Lines ==
Fukuroda Station is served by the Suigun Line, and is located 51.8 rail kilometers from the official starting point of the line at Mito Station.

== Station layout ==
The station consists of a single side platform serving traffic in both directions. The station originally was built with two opposed side platforms, and the ruins of the unused platform are still in situ. The station is staffed.

== History ==
Fukuroda Station opened on March 3, 1927. The station was absorbed into the JR East network upon the privatization of the Japanese National Railways (JNR) on April 1, 1987.

== Passenger statistics ==
In fiscal 2019, the station was used by an average of 59 passengers daily (boarding passengers only).

== Surrounding area ==
- National Route 118
- National Route 461
- Fukuroda Falls
- Daigo-Fukuroda Post Office
- Kujigawa River

== See also ==
- List of railway stations in Japan
