= Daigo, Ibaraki =

Daigo 大子町
- Town
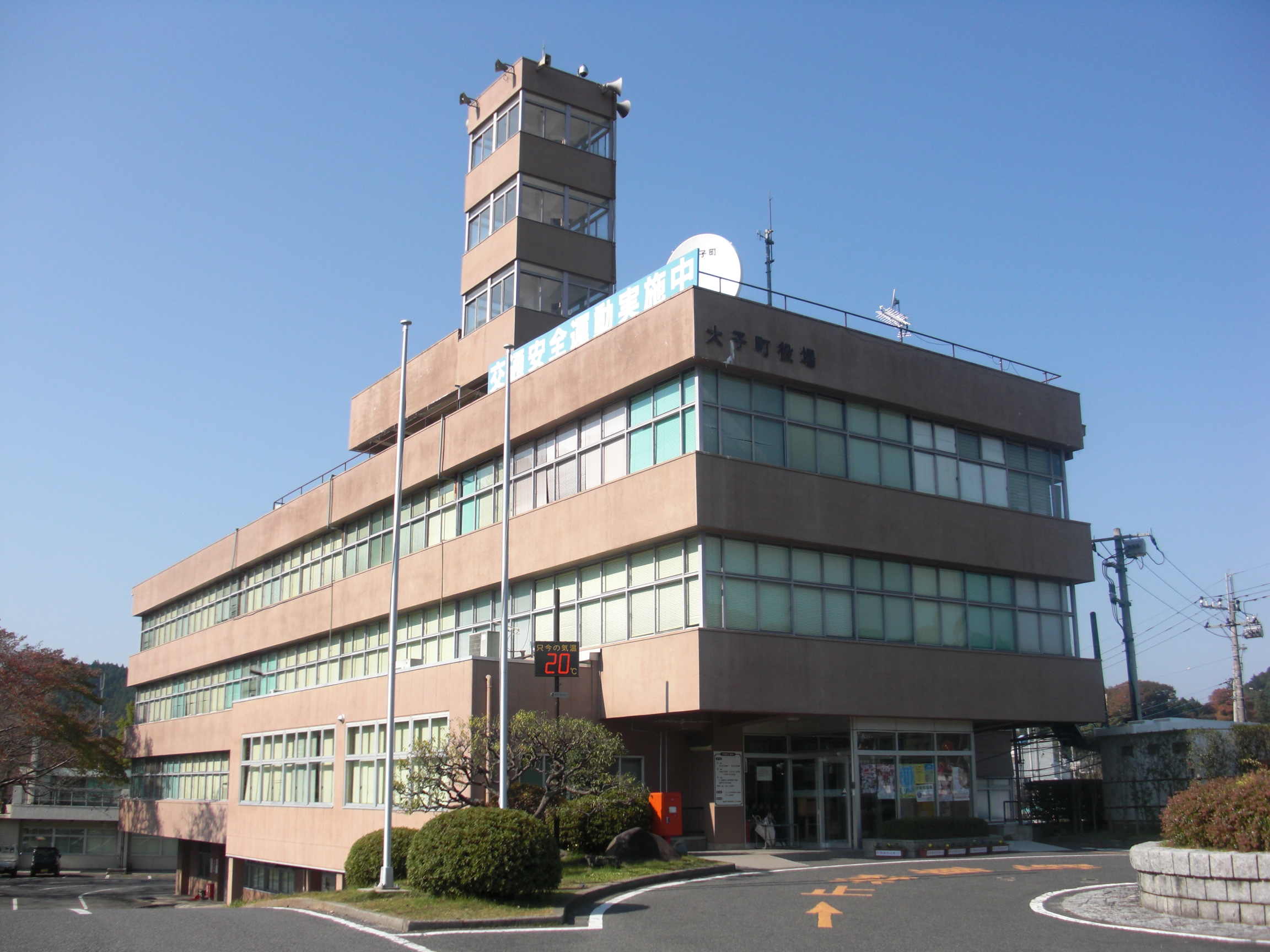
- Daigo town office

- Flag Seal

- Location of Daigo in Ibaraki Prefecture

- Coordinates: 36°46′5.2″N 140°21′18.8″E
- Country: Japan
- Region: Kantō
- Prefecture: Ibaraki
- District: Kuji

Area
  - Total: 325.76 km^{2} (125.78 sq mi)

Population (September 2020)
  - Total: 15,725
  - Density: 48.272/km^{2} (125.02/sq mi)
- Time zone: UTC+9 (Japan Standard Time)
- Phone number: 0295-72-1111
- Address: 866 Daigo, Daigo-machi, Kuji-gun, Ibaraki-ken 319-3526
- Climate: Cfa
- Website: Official website
- Symbols
- Bird: Aix galericulata
- Flower: Tea
- Tree: Fagus crenata

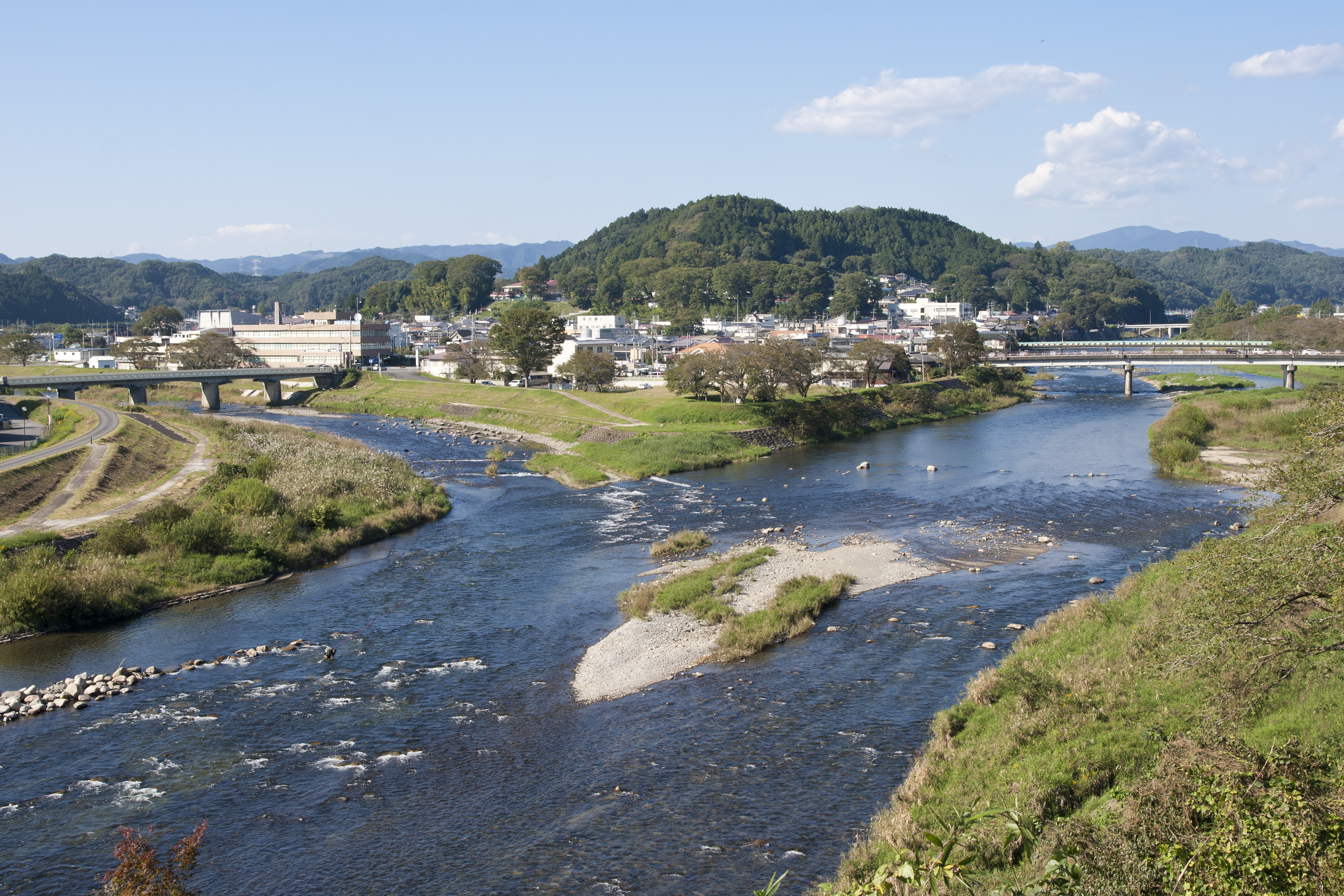
Kuji River in Daigo

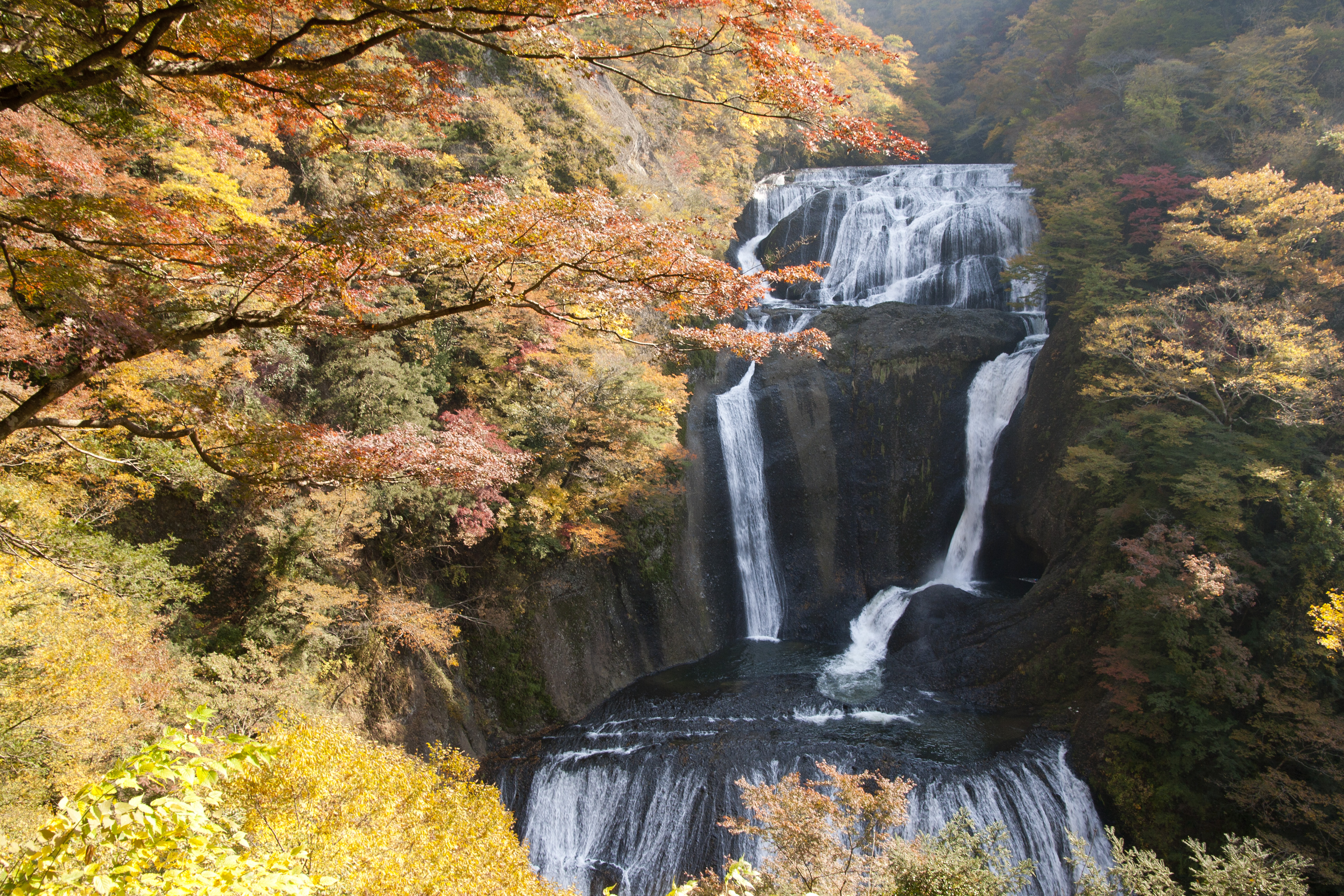
Fukuroda Falls

Daigo (大子町, Daigo-machi) is a town located in Ibaraki Prefecture, Japan. As of 1 July 2020, the town had an estimated population of 15,771 in 6431 households and a population density of 48.4 inhabitants per square kilometre (125/sq mi). The percentage of the population aged over 65 was 46.6%. The total area of the town is 325.76 square kilometres (125.78 sq mi).

== Geography ==
Located in northwestern Ibaraki Prefecture along the upper reaches of the Kuji River, Daigo is bordered to the north by Fukushima Prefecture and to the west by Tochigi Prefecture.

=== Surrounding municipalities ===
Fukushima Prefecture

- Tanagura
- Yamatsuri

Ibaraki Prefecture

- Hitachiōmiya
- Hitachiōta

Tochigi Prefecture

- Nakagawa
- Ōtawara

=== Climate ===
Although the altitude is relatively low at 120 meters, Daigo is very chilly in the morning and evening in winter because it is located in a basin. The average minimum temperature of minus 5.5 °C in January is almost the same as Morioka, Iwate, much further north, and Daigo is known for having some of the coldest winters in the Kantō region. However, during the daytime, the temperature rises to nearly 10 °C due to solar radiation. In addition, summers often record hot days.

Climate data for Daigo (1991−2020 normals, extremes 1978−present)
Month	Jan	Feb	Mar	Apr	May	Jun	Jul	Aug	Sep	Oct	Nov	Dec	Year
Record high °C (°F)	17.9 (64.2)	22.5 (72.5)	26.0 (78.8)	31.5 (88.7)	35.5 (95.9)	36.5 (97.7)	38.3 (100.9)	39.0 (102.2)	37.3 (99.1)	32.0 (89.6)	24.3 (75.7)	24.1 (75.4)	39.0 (102.2)
Mean daily maximum °C (°F)	8.2 (46.8)	9.3 (48.7)	12.9 (55.2)	18.5 (65.3)	23.5 (74.3)	26.2 (79.2)	29.9 (85.8)	31.3 (88.3)	27.1 (80.8)	21.3 (70.3)	15.7 (60.3)	10.5 (50.9)	19.5 (67.2)
Daily mean °C (°F)	0.6 (33.1)	1.8 (35.2)	5.4 (41.7)	10.9 (51.6)	16.2 (61.2)	20.1 (68.2)	23.9 (75.0)	24.9 (76.8)	21.0 (69.8)	14.8 (58.6)	8.3 (46.9)	2.8 (37.0)	12.6 (54.6)
Mean daily minimum °C (°F)	−5.1 (22.8)	−4.2 (24.4)	−1.0 (30.2)	4.2 (39.6)	10.2 (50.4)	15.6 (60.1)	20.0 (68.0)	20.9 (69.6)	16.9 (62.4)	10.2 (50.4)	2.9 (37.2)	−2.7 (27.1)	7.3 (45.2)
Record low °C (°F)	−15.6 (3.9)	−14.0 (6.8)	−11.0 (12.2)	−6.0 (21.2)	−0.6 (30.9)	5.6 (42.1)	10.3 (50.5)	11.3 (52.3)	4.6 (40.3)	−1.7 (28.9)	−6.2 (20.8)	−10.8 (12.6)	−15.6 (3.9)
Average precipitation mm (inches)	38.9 (1.53)	42.7 (1.68)	92.1 (3.63)	115.8 (4.56)	134.0 (5.28)	148.0 (5.83)	203.6 (8.02)	187.7 (7.39)	197.8 (7.79)	163.3 (6.43)	75.6 (2.98)	43.3 (1.70)	1,451.3 (57.14)
Average precipitation days (≥ 1.0 mm)	4.5	5.2	9.1	10.6	11.8	12.7	14.4	11.4	12.0	10.5	6.9	4.6	113.7
Mean monthly sunshine hours	201.7	187.3	198.6	196.0	186.9	133.7	133.8	157.6	128.4	144.3	160.6	184.2	2,011.8
Source: Japan Meteorological Agency

== Demographics ==
Per Japanese census data, the population of Daigo has decreased drastically and is now less than half of what it was 60 years ago.

Historical population
Year	Pop.	±%
1950	44,784	—
1960	40,178	−10.3%
1970	32,953	−18.0%
1980	29,524	−10.4%
1990	27,067	−8.3%
2000	23,892	−11.7%
2010	20,073	−16.0%
2020	15,736	−21.6%

== History ==
Daigo village was created with the establishment of the modern municipalities system on April 1, 1889. It was elevated to town status on July 20, 1891. On March 31, 1955, the villages of Yorigami, Fukuroda, Miyagawa, Kurosawa, Namase, Kamiogawa, Shimoogawa and Murotono merged with Daigo.

== Government ==
Daigo has a mayor-council form of government with a directly elected mayor and a unicameral town council of 13 members. Daigo, together with neighbouring Hitachiōta, contributes two members to the Ibaraki Prefectural Assembly. In terms of national politics, the town is part of Ibaraki 5th district of the lower house of the Diet of Japan.

== Economy ==
Daigo is noted for many onsens (hot springs) and agricultural products of many kinds.

Besides that Daigo is well known for its tea production. It is one of the northernmost places in Japan where tea grows. The area's fertile soil, clean air, and mild climate provide ideal growing conditions for tea plants. Tea production has been a vital part of Daigo's economy and culture for centuries, with many small family-run tea farms still operating in the region.

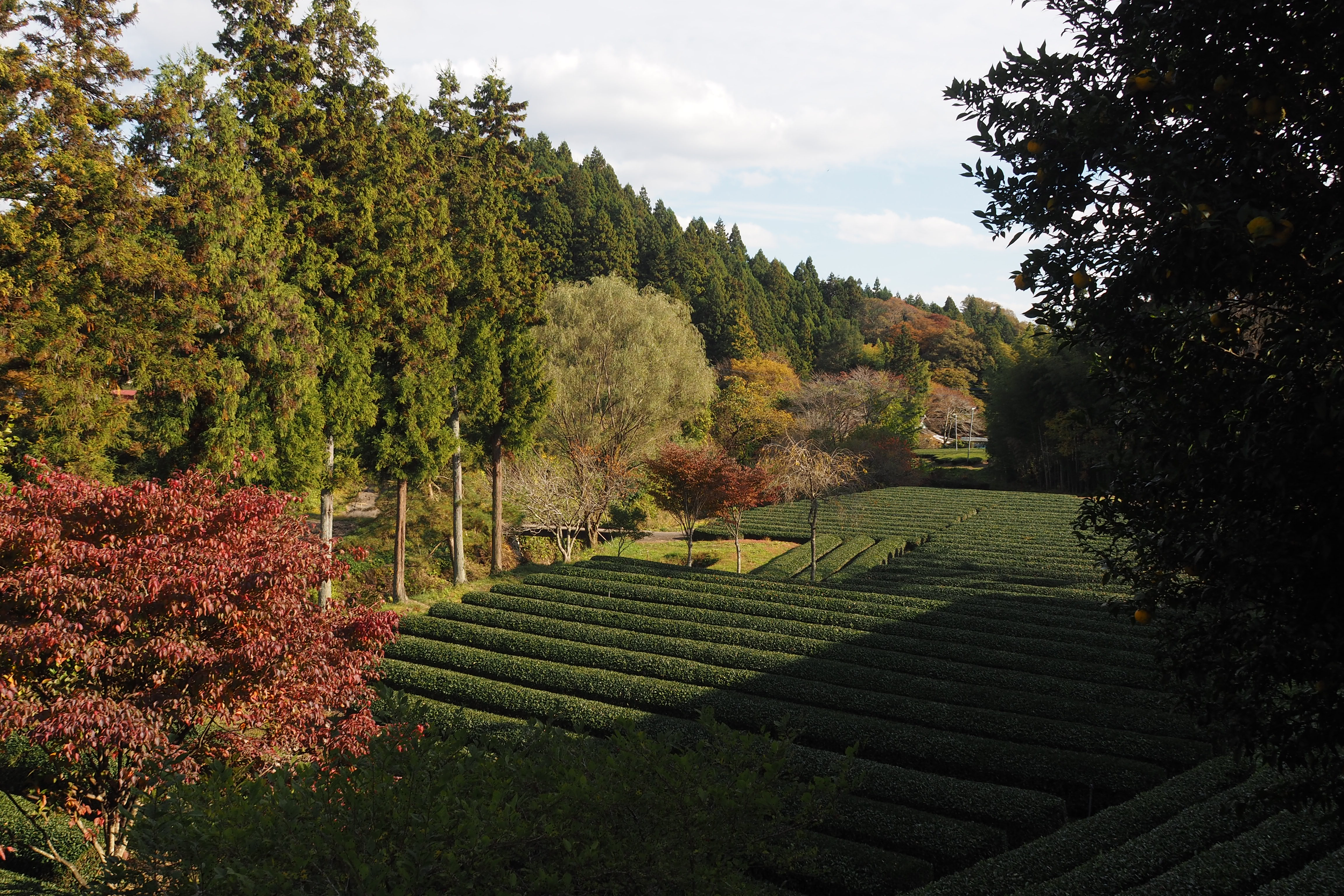
Tea garden in Daigo

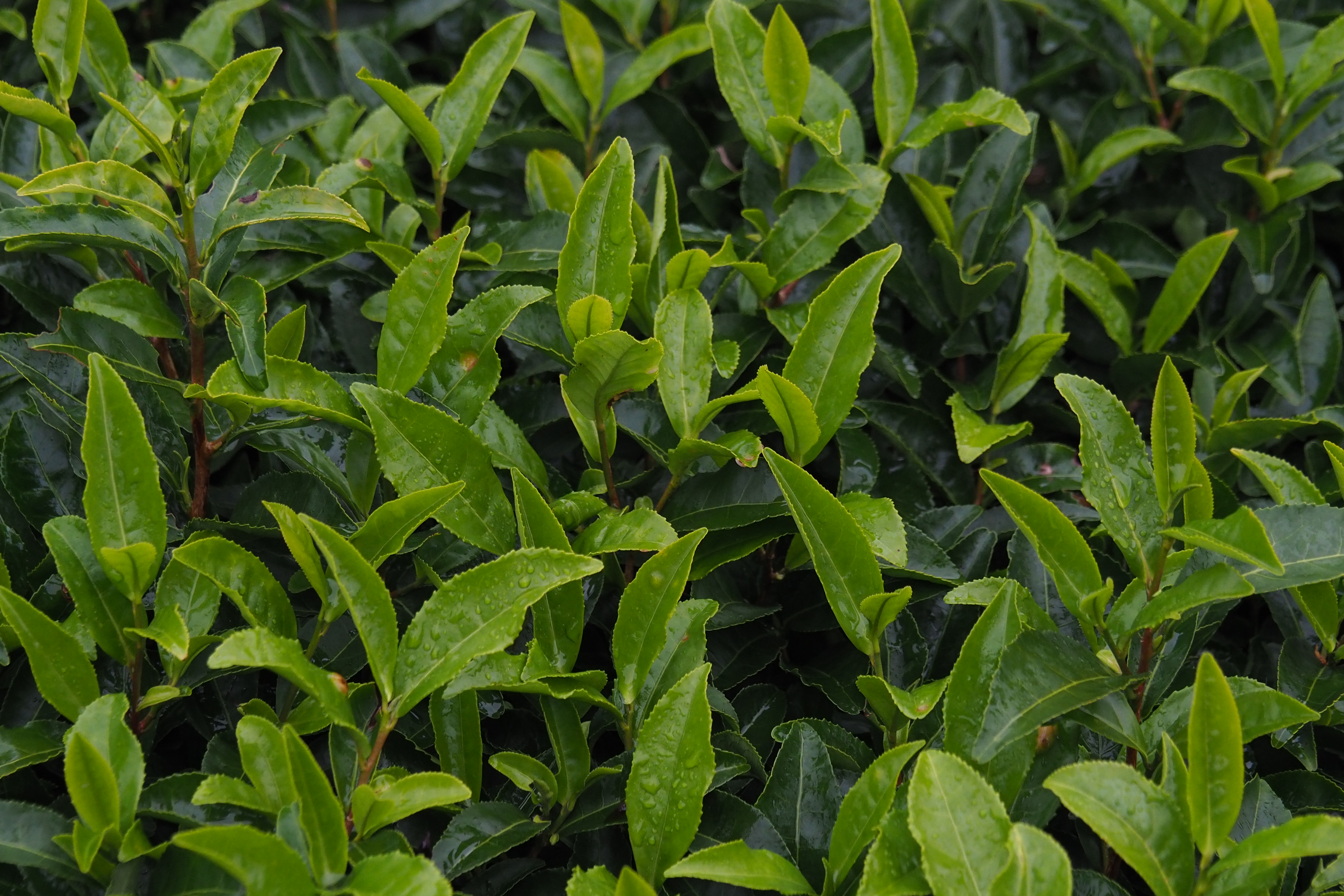
A close-up of tea leaves

== Education ==
Daigo has six public elementary schools and four public middle schools operated by the city government, and one public high school operated by the Ibaraki Prefectural Board of Education. There is also one private high school. The prefecture also operates one special education school for the handicapped.

== Transportation ==
=== Railway ===
JR East – Suigun Line

- Saigane - Kami-Ogawa - Fukuroda - Hitachi-Daigo - Shimonomiya

=== Highway ===
- National Route 118
- National Route 461

== Local attractions ==
- Daigo onsen
- Fukuroda Falls – one of Japan's Top 100 Waterfalls
- Fukuroda onsen

== Noted people ==
- Yasunori Kikuchi, professional baseball player
- Yasumitsu Toyoda, professional baseball player
