= Ōmiya =

Ōmiya 大宮 is a Japanese word originally used for the imperial palace or shrines, now a common name, and may refer to:

== People ==
- Ōmiya (surname), a Japanese surname
- Ōmiya, or Ōmiya of the Third Street (三条の大宮, Sanjō no Ōmiya) is a female character in The Tale of Genji, an 11th-century novel

== Places ==
- Ōmiya Palace
- Ōmiya Bonsai Village, famous for bonsai pot gardening is located in Kita-ku, Saitama, Japan
- Ōmiya-shuku, the fourth station on the 17-19th-century Japanese national highway Nakasendō, located in current Ōmiya-ku, Saitama
- Railway stations: See Ōmiya Station (disambiguation) for an incomplete list
- Refugee Camps: Omiya Refugee Camp in Gwere, Uganda.
- Local governments:
  - Current ward/government names
    - Ōmiya-ku, Saitama, Ōmiya, Saitama, Japan.
    - Hitachi-Ōmiya, Ibaraki, Ōmiya, Naka District, Ibaraki, Japan
    - :ja:Ōmiya regional autonomous ward (ja:地域自治区, chiiki jichi-ku), Miyazaki, Miyazaki was Ōmiya, Miyazaki District, Miyazaki, Japan
  - Past government names
    - Ōmiya, Kitaadachi District, Saitama was a city and its area is now Kita-ku, Minuma-ku, Nishi-ku and Ōmiya-ku of Saitama, Saitama, Japan
    - Ōmiya, Chichibu District, Saitama was a town and now is a part of Chichibu, Saitama, Japan
    - Ōmiya, Watarai District, Mie was a town and now is a part of Taiki, Mie, Japan
    - Ōmiya, Naka District, Kyōto was a town and now is a part of Kyōtango, Kyoto, Japan
    - Ōmiya, Fuji District, Shizuoka was a town and now is part of Fujinomiya, Shizuoka, Japan
    - Ōmiya, Minami-Aizu District, Fukushima was a village and now is a part of Minamiaizu, Fukushima, Japan
    - Ōmiya, Shioya District, Tochigi was a village and now is a part of Shioya, Tochigi, Japan
    - Ōmiya, Shimotsuga District, Tochigi was a village and now is a part of Tochigi, Tochigi, Japan
    - Ōmiya, Oku District, Okayama was a village and now is divided into Okayama, Okayama and Setouchi, Okayama, Japan
    - Ōmiya, Hino District, Tottori was a village and now is a part of Nichinan, Tottori, Japan
    - Ōmiya, Inashiki District, Ibaraki was a village and now is a part of Ryūgasaki, Ibaraki, Japan

== Sports ==
- Omiya Ardija, a professional football (soccer) club based in Ōmiya-ku, Saitama, Japan and Ōmiya Park Soccer Stadium
