= Ōmiya Station =

Ōmiya Station is the name of multiple railway stations in Japan.

- Ōmiya Station (Kyoto) in Nakagyō-ku, Kyōto City on the Kyoto Line of Hankyu Railway
- Ōmiya Station (Saitama) in Ōmiya-ku, Saitama City of the East Japan Railway Company (JR East), Tobu Railway and Saitama New Urban Transit
- Awa-Ōmiya Station in Itano, Itano District, Tokushima Prefecture on the Kōtoku Line of Shikoku Railway Company (JR Shikoku)
- Echizen-Ōmiya Station in Fukui, Fukui on West Japan Railway Company (JR West)
- Hitachi-Ōmiya Station in Hitachi-Ōmiya, Ibaraki on the Suigun Line of the East Japan Railway Company
- Higashi-Ōmiya Station in Minuma-ku, Saitama City on the Utsunomiya Line of the East Japan Railway Company
- Izumi-Ōmiya Station in Kishiwada, Ōsaka Prefecture on the Nankai Main Line of Nankai Electric Railway
- Kita-Ōmiya Station in Ōmiya-ku, Saitama City on the Noda Line of Tobu Railway
- Kyōtango-Ōmiya Station in Kyōtango, Kyoto Prefecture on the Miyazu Line of Kitakinki tango Railway
- Ōmiya-kōen Station in Ōmiya-ku, Saitama City Saitama on the Tōbu Noda Line
- Sembayashi-Omiya Station in Asahi-ku, Osaka City on the Tanimachi Line of Ōsaka Municipal Subway
- Shijō-Ōmiya Station in Shimogyō-ku, Kyōto City on the Arashiyama Main Line of Keifuku Electric Railroad
- Shin-Ōmiya Station in Nara City in Nara Prefecture, on the Kintetsu Nara Line

== See also ==
- Ōmiya (disambiguation)
