= Saigane Station =

Railway station in Daigo, Ibaraki Prefecture, Japan

Saigane Station 西金駅
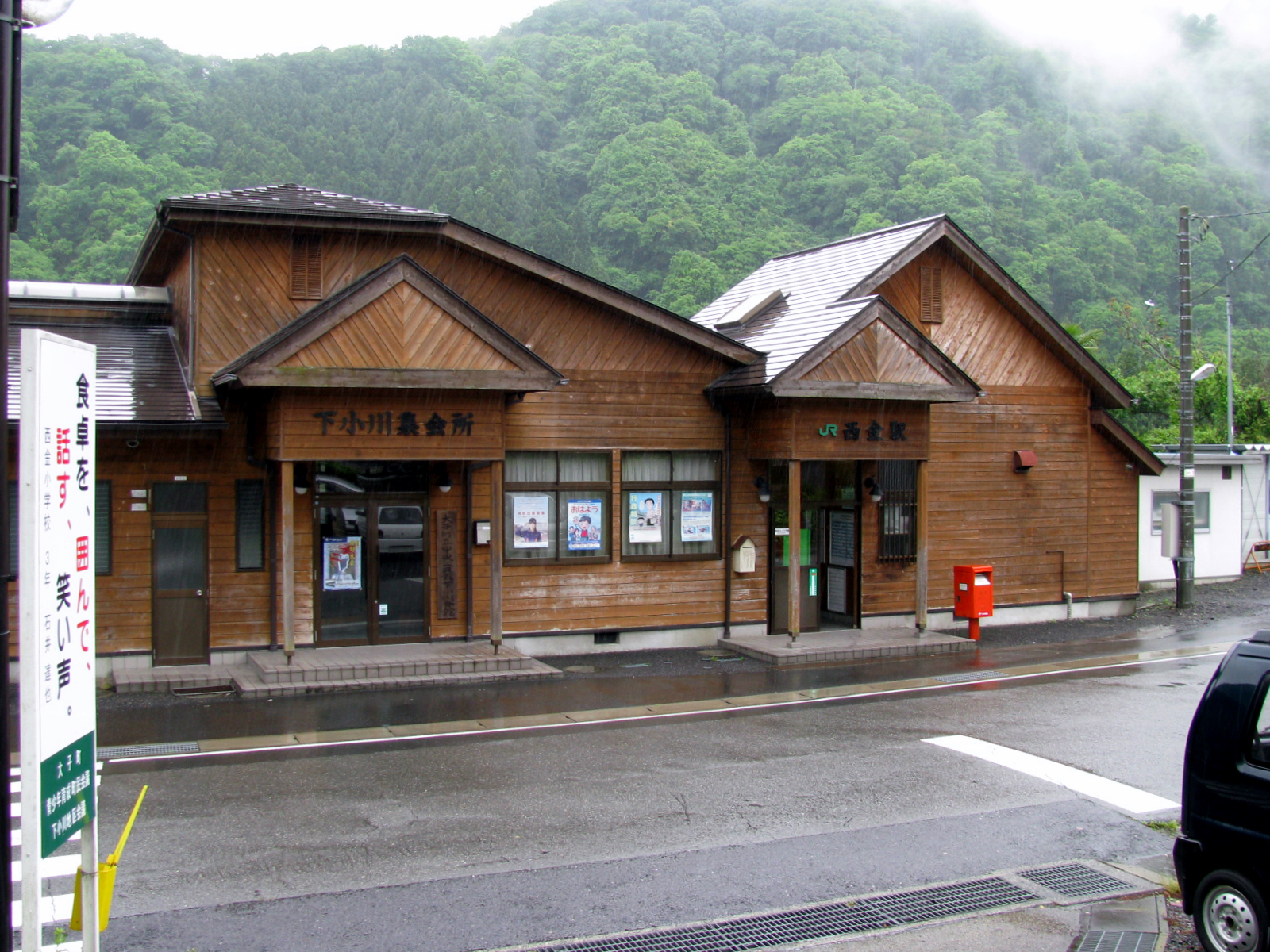
- Saigane Station in May 2008

General information
- Location: Saigane 381-1, Daigo-mach, Kuji-gun, Ibaraki-ken 319-3362; Japan
- Coordinates: 36.6953°N 140.3865°E
- Operator: JR East
- Line: Suigun Line – 1
- Distance: 44.1 km from Mito
- Platforms: 1 side platform

Other information
- Status: Unstaffed
- Website: Official website

History
- Opened: March 21, 1926

Services
Preceding station	JR East	Following station
Shimo-Ogawa towards Mito	Suigun Line	Kami-Ogawa towards Kōriyama
Location
- Location within Ibaraki Prefecture Location within Japan

Saigane Station (西金駅, Saigane-eki) is a passenger railway station in the town of Daigo, Kuji, Ibaraki, Japan, operated by East Japan Railway Company (JR East).

== Lines ==
Saigane Station is served by the Suigun Line, and is located 44.1 rail kilometers from the official starting point of the line at Mito Station.

== Station layout ==
The station consists of a single side platform serving traffic in both directions. The station building also functions as the local civic center. The station is unattended.

== History ==
Saigane Station opened on March 21, 1926. When constructing the Suigun Line began, a station was originally planned to be built in Saigane. However, during surveying work in 1921 the residents around the current Kami-Ogawa Station and Shimo-Ogawa Station on either side of Saigane learned that no stations were planned for their hamlets, and after violent protests and attacking the surveying engineer, it was decided a station would not be built in Saigane after all, and that stations would be constructed on either side instead. This enraged the residents around Saigane, who decided if there was to be no station, there is no need to pass the railroad through their hamlet. They staged violent protests attacking the construction crews and refused to sell the lands needed for the railroad. The Railway Ministry at one point decided to stop construction on the Suigun line, but this in turn enraged the residents around Hitachi-Daigo Station. Ultimately, Prime Minister Kato Takaaki was forced to intervene, and stations were constructed at all three locations. Monuments to these events were erected in front of the station building in 1957 and 1961. The station was absorbed into the JR East network upon the privatization of the Japanese National Railways (JNR) on April 1, 1987.

== Surrounding area ==
- National Route 118
- Saigane Post Office
- Kujigawa River

== See also ==
- List of railway stations in Japan
