= Nabatame =

Nabatame (written: 生天目 or 生田目) is a Japanese surname. Notable people with the surname include:

- Hitomi Nabatame (生天目 仁美, born 1976), Japanese actress and singer
- Tsubasa Nabatame (生田目 翼, born 1995), Japanese baseball player
