= Nogamihara Station =

Railway station in Hitachiōmiya, Ibaraki Prefecture, Japan

Nogamihara Station 野上原駅
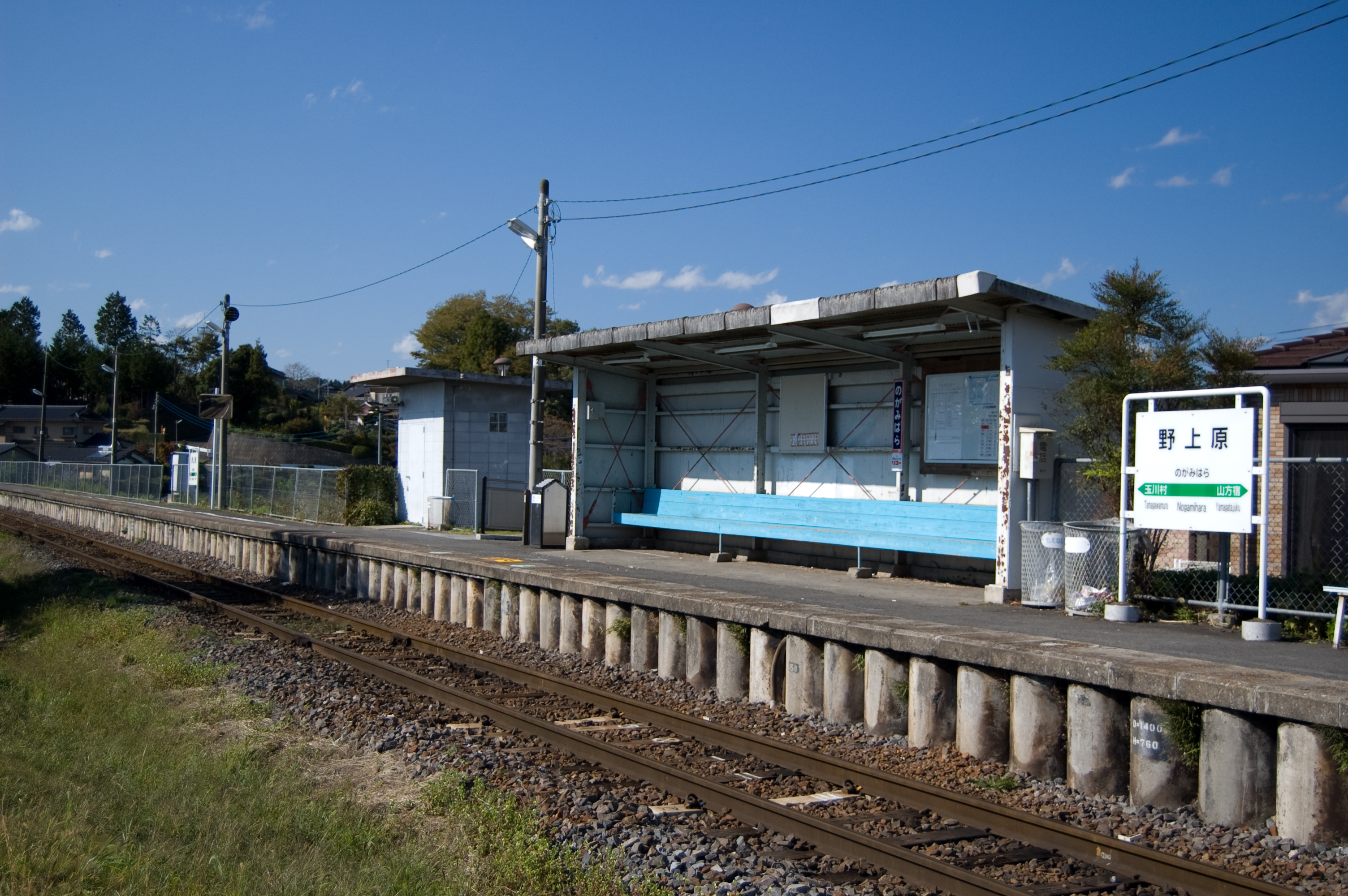
- Nogamihara Station in October 2007

General information
- Location: Nogami Shitamachi 1234-1, Hitachiōmiya-shi, Ibaraki-ken 319-3114; Japan
- Coordinates: 36.6058°N 140.3899°E
- Operator: JR East
- Line: ■ Suigun Line
- Distance: 32.5 km from Mito
- Platforms: 1 side platform

Other information
- Status: Unstaffed
- Website: Official website

History
- Opened: November 19, 1956

Services
Preceding station	JR East	Following station
Tamagawamura towards Mito	Suigun Line	Yamagatajuku towards Kōriyama
Location
- Location within Ibaraki Prefecture Location within Japan

Nogamihara Station (野上原駅, Nogamihara-eki) is a passenger railway station in the city of Hitachiōmiya, Ibaraki, Japan operated by East Japan Railway Company (JR East).

== Lines ==
Nogamihara Station is served by the Suigun Line, and is located 32.5 rail kilometers from the official starting point of the line at Mito Station.

== Station layout ==
The station consists of a single side platform serving traffic in both directions. There is no station building. The station is unattended.

== History ==
Nogamihara Station opened on November 19, 1956. The station was absorbed into the JR East network upon the privatization of the Japanese National Railways (JNR) on April 1, 1987.

== Surrounding area ==
- National Route 118
- Nogamihara Danchi

== See also ==
- List of railway stations in Japan
