= Tamagawamura Station =

Railway station in Hitachiōmiya, Ibaraki Prefecture, Japan

Tamagawamura Station 玉川村駅
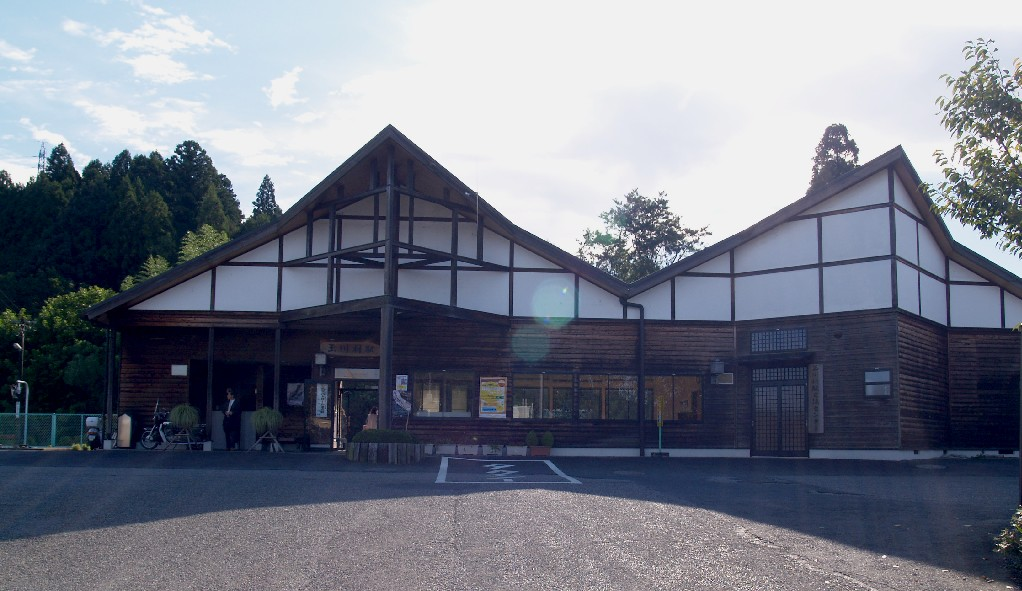
- Tamagawamura Station in October 2007

General information
- Location: Higashino 4580, Hitachiōmiya-shi, Ibaraki-ken 319-2224; Japan
- Coordinates: 36.5791°N 140.3741°E
- Operator: JR East
- Line: ■ Suigun Line
- Distance: 28.8 km from Mito
- Platforms: 2 side platforms

Other information
- Status: Staffed
- Website: Official website

History
- Opened: December 10, 1922

Passengers
- FY2019: 155

Services
Preceding station	JR East	Following station
Hitachi-Ōmiya towards Mito	Suigun Line	Nogamihara towards Kōriyama
Location
- Location within Ibaraki Prefecture Location within Japan

Tamagawamura Station (玉川村駅, Tamagawamura-eki) is a passenger railway station in the city of Hitachiōmiya, Ibaraki, Japan operated by East Japan Railway Company (JR East).

== Lines ==
Tamagawamura Station is served by the Suigun Line, and is located 28.8 rail kilometers from the official starting point of the line at Mito Station.

== Station layout ==
The station consists of two opposed side platforms connected to the station building by a footbridge. The station is staffed.

=== Platforms ===
1	■ Suigun Line	for Hitachi-Daigo and Kōriyama
2	■ Suigun Line	for Hitachi-Ōmiya and Mito

== History ==
Tamagawamura Station opened on December 10, 1922. The station was absorbed into the JR East network upon the privatization of the Japanese National Railways (JNR) on April 1, 1987.

== Passenger statistics ==
In fiscal 2019, the station was used by an average of 155 passengers daily (boarding passengers only).

== Surrounding area ==
- National Route 293
- Ōmiya-Tamagawa Post Office

== See also ==
- List of railway stations in Japan
