= Fukuroda Falls =

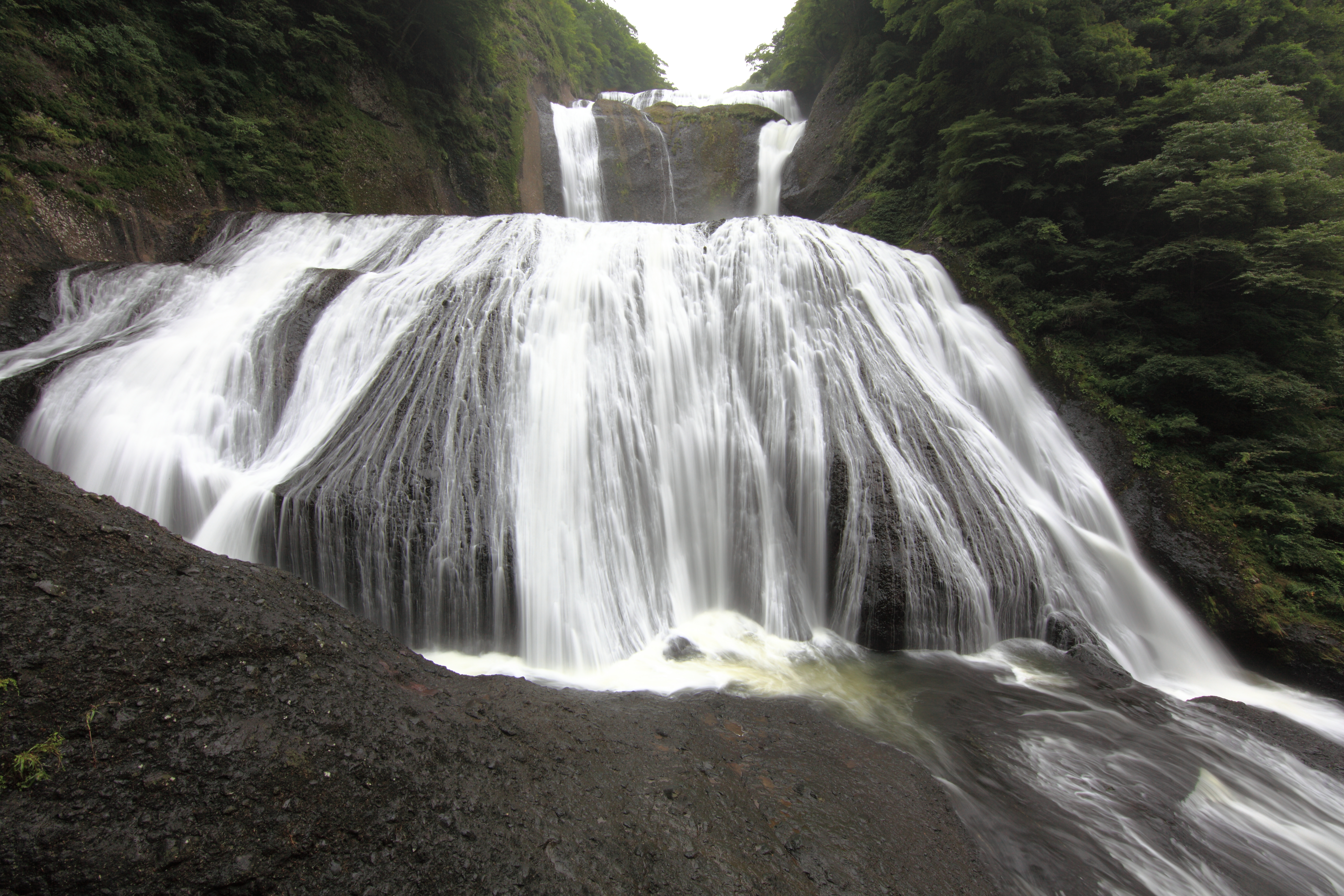
- Fukuroda Falls

- Location within Ibaraki Prefecture Location within Japan
- Location: Daigo, Ibaraki, Japan
- Coordinates: 36°45′52″N 140°24′27.5″E
- Type: Multi-Step
- Total height: 120 m (390 ft)
- Number of drops: 4
- Average width: 73 m (240 ft)
- Watercourse: Taki River
- National Place of Scenic Beauty

Fukuroda Falls (袋田の滝, Fukuroda-no-taki) is a waterfall located in the town of Daigo, Ibaraki Prefecture Japan. It is a nationally designated Place of Scenic Beauty. and is one of "Japan’s Top 100 Waterfalls", per a listing published by the Japanese Ministry of the Environment in 1990. The falls are ranked as the third most beautiful waterfall in Japan, coming after Kegon Falls (華厳滝, Kegon-no-taki) and Nachi Falls (那智滝, Nachi-no-taki).

== Overview ==
The falls are located within the borders of the Okukuji Prefectural Nature Park. The falls are on the Taki River (滝川, Taki-gawa), which has its source spring just above the falls. The river ultimately joins the Kuji River, one of the major rivers in the northern Kantō region. The falls have a width of 73 metres (240 ft) and are 120 metres (390 ft) at their highest point, with four main tiers. Geologically, the falls are located on a cliff created by a volcanic ejecta some 15 million years ago. During winter the falls may freeze.

The closest train station is Fukuroda Station on the JR East Suigun Line located 3 kilometres (1.9 mi) away. By car, the falls can be reached from the Naka Interchange on the Jōban Expressway to Japan National Route 118 in the direction of Ōmiya.

== Gallery ==
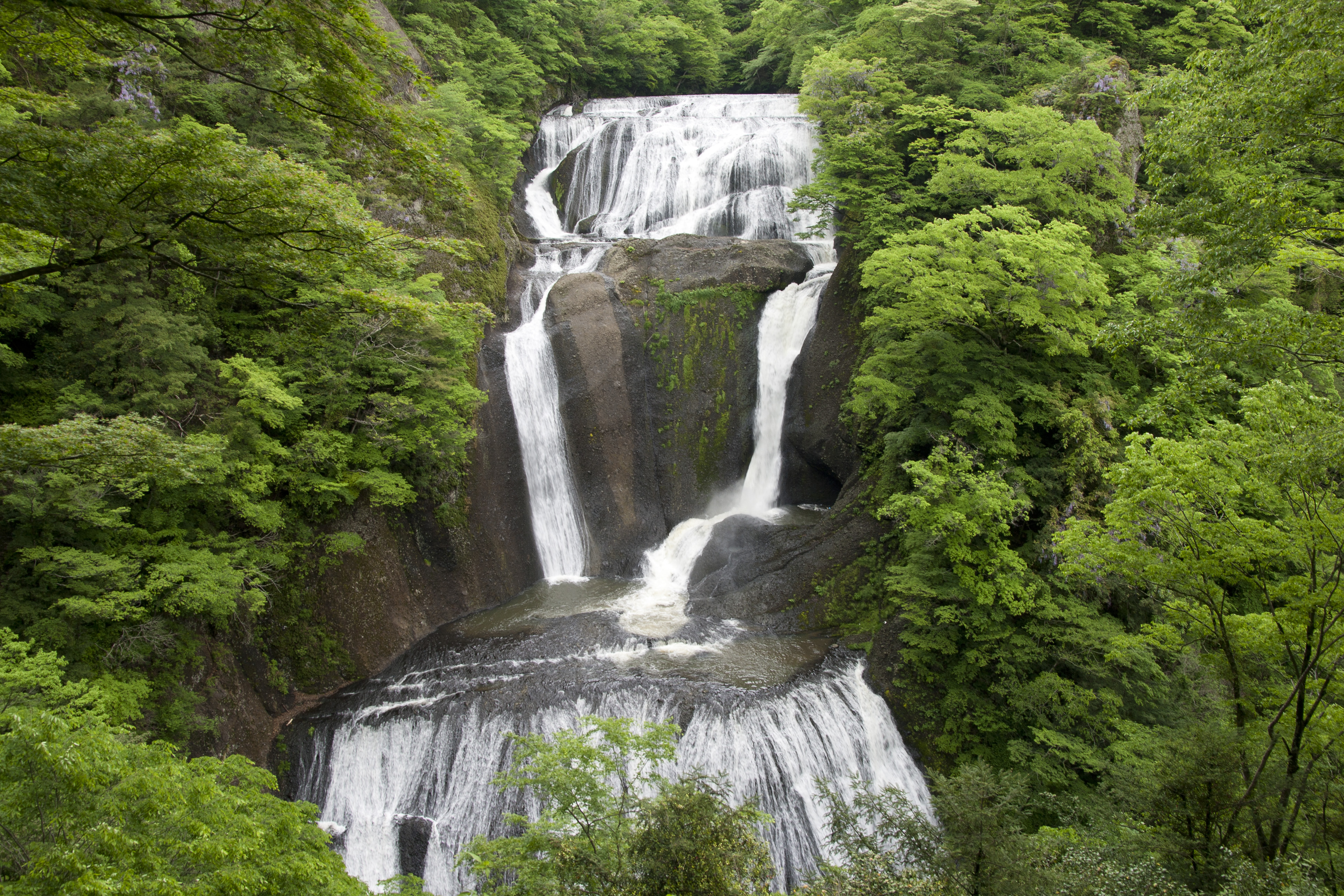
Fukuroda Falls in spring (May)

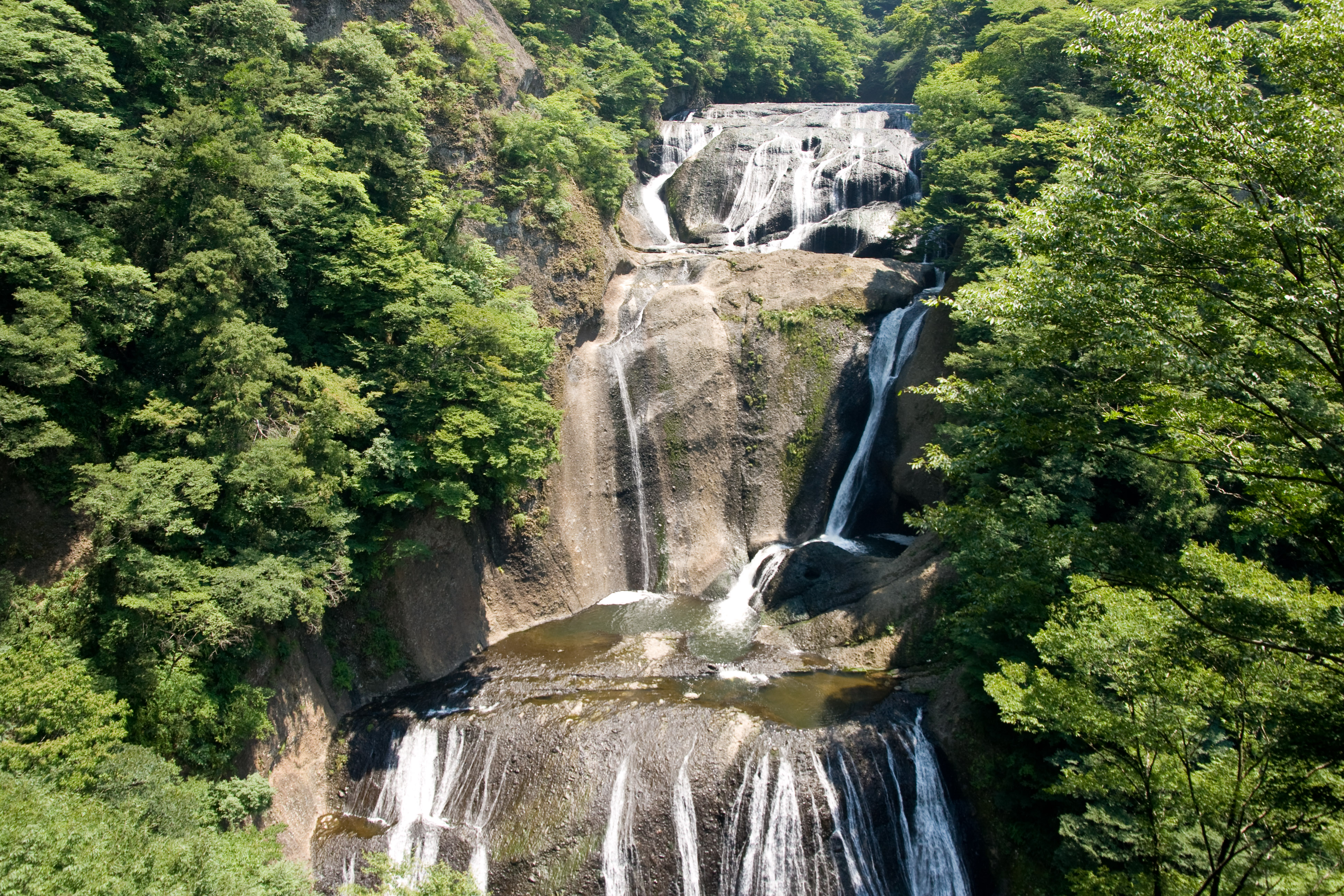
Fukuroda Falls in summer (August)

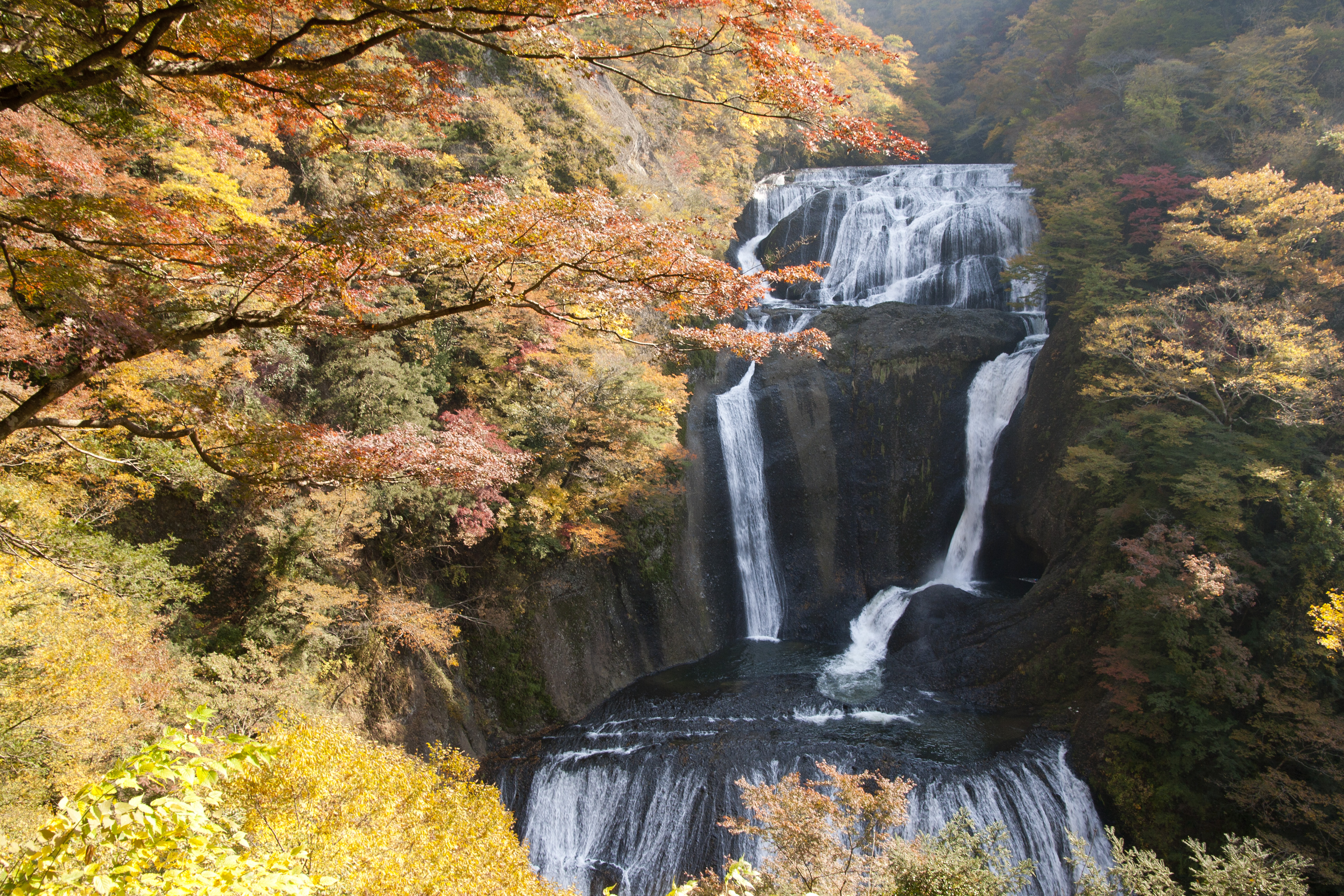
Fukuroda Falls in autumn (November)

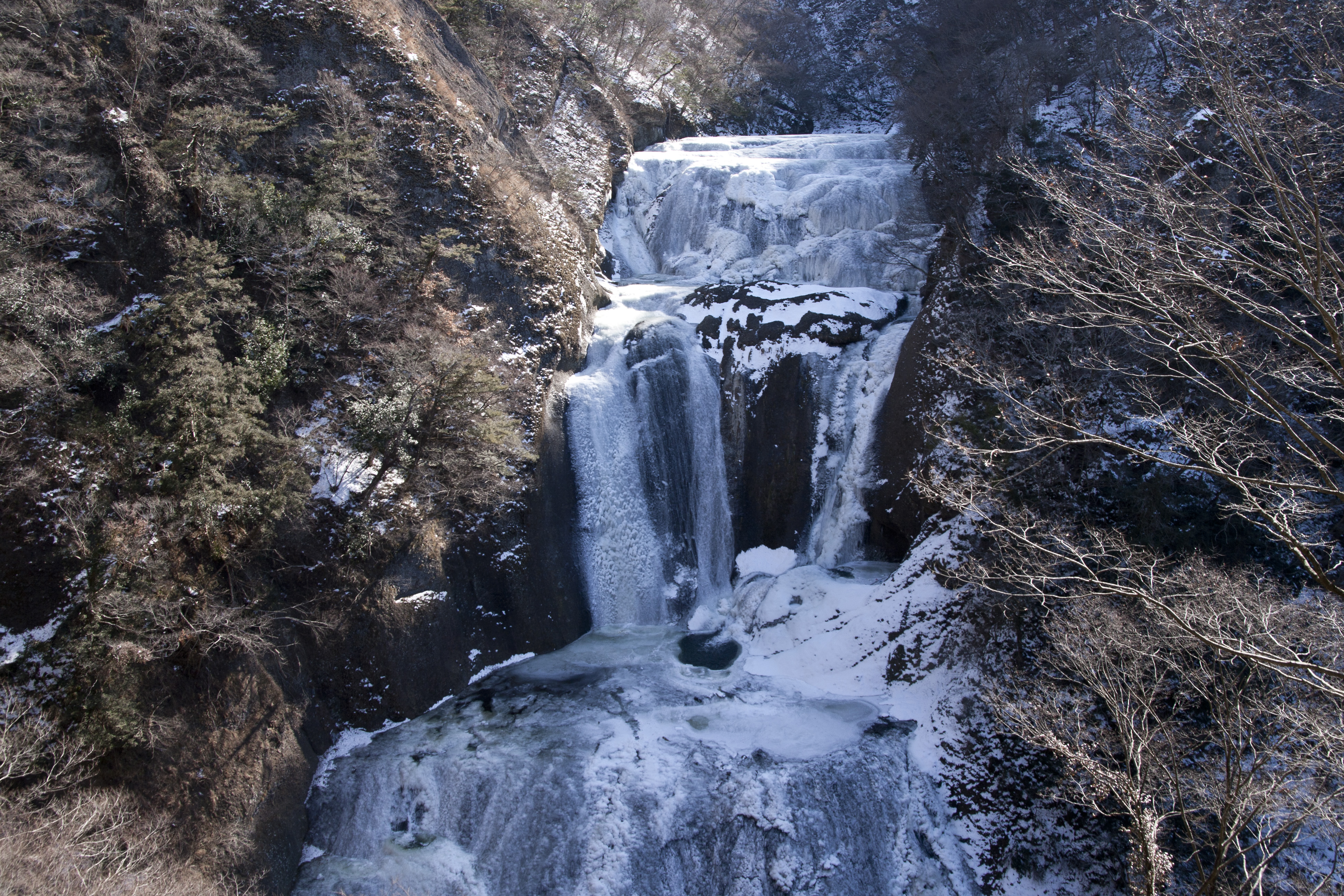
Fukuroda Falls in winter (January)

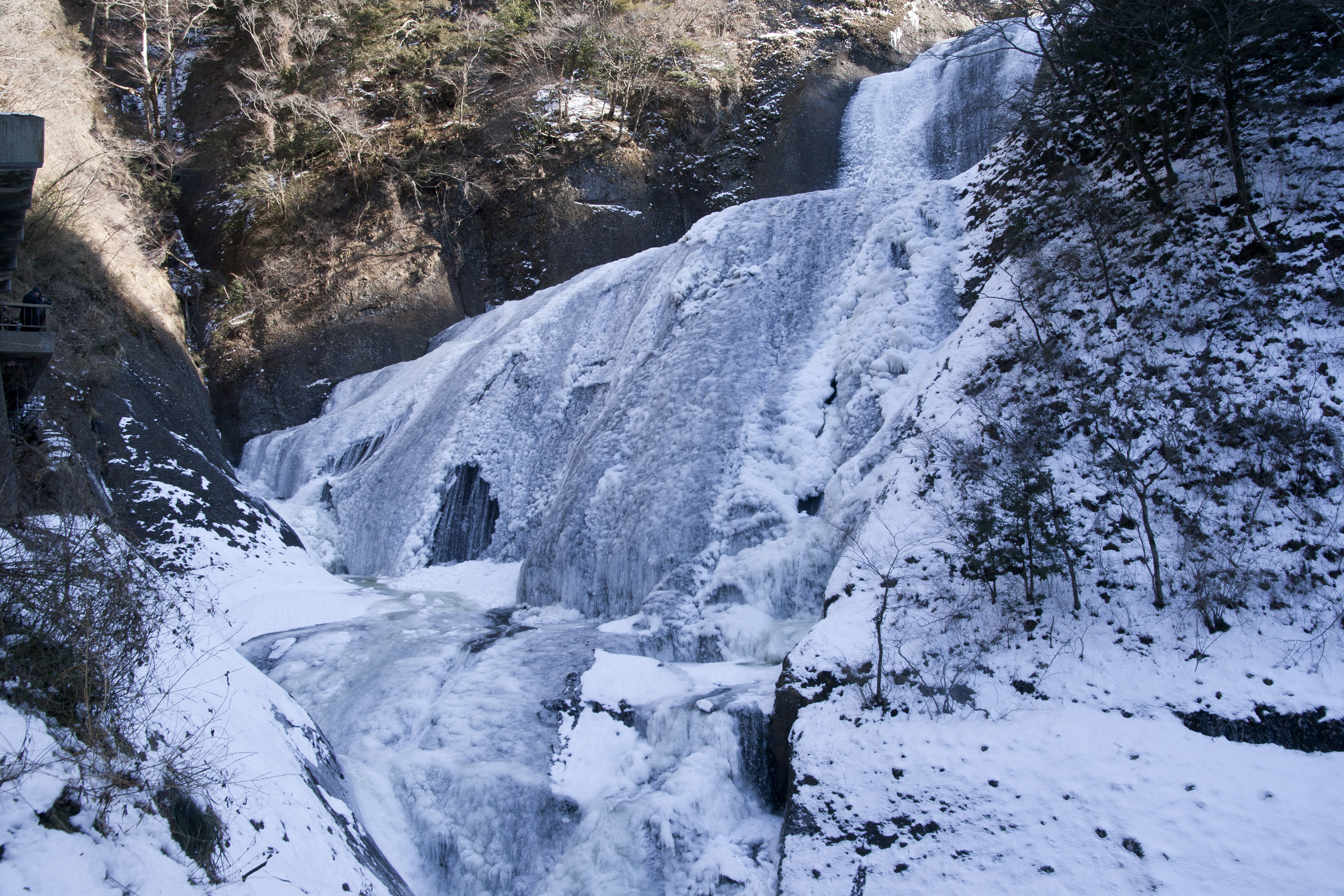
Frozen Fukuroda Falls (January)

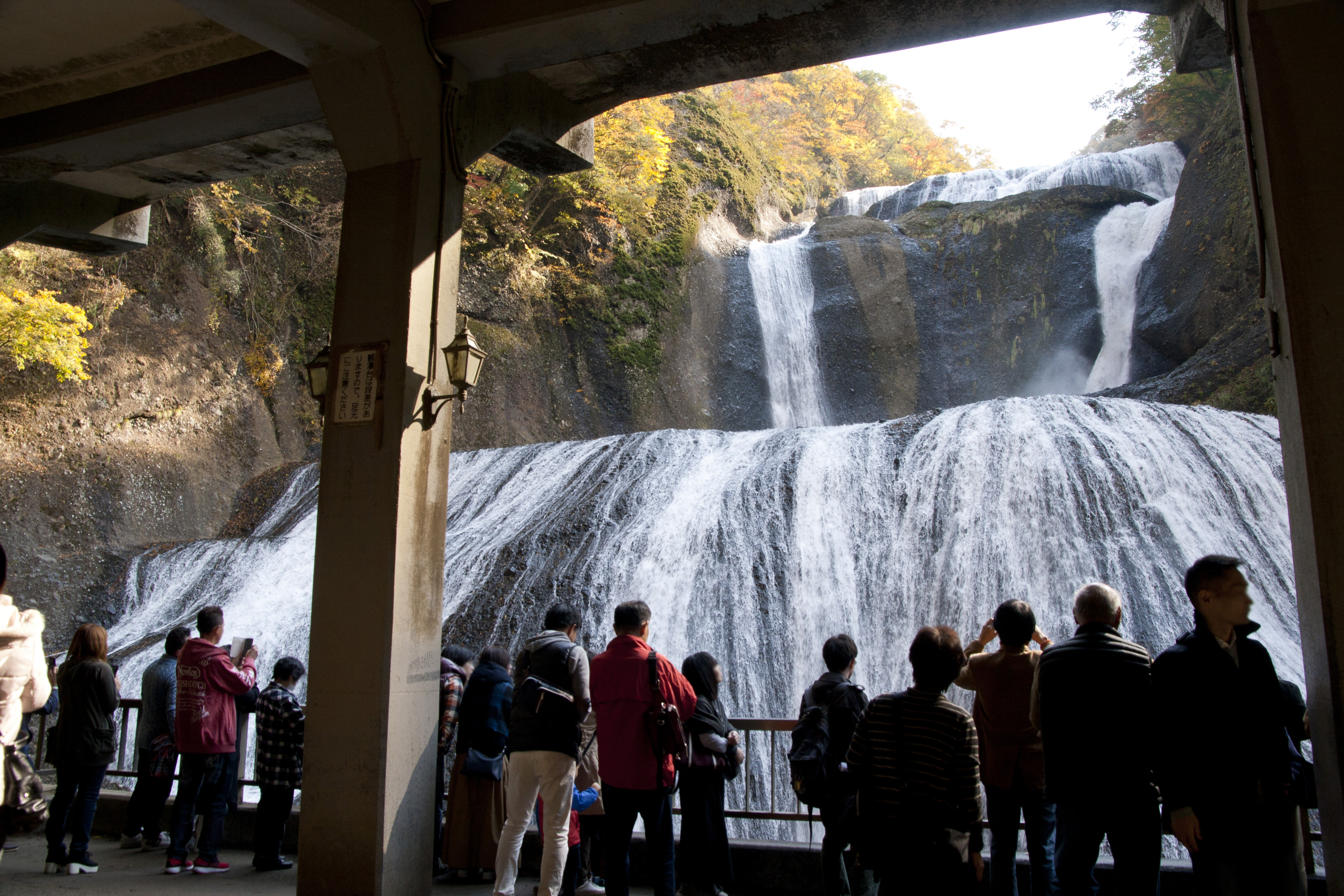
Fukuroda Falls from Viewing Platform No.1

== See also ==
- Japan's Top 100 Waterfalls
- List of waterfalls
- List of waterfalls in Japan
- List of Places of Scenic Beauty of Japan (Ibaraki)
