= Tsubasa Nabatame =

Japanese baseball player (born 1995)

Tsubasa Nabatame 生田目 翼
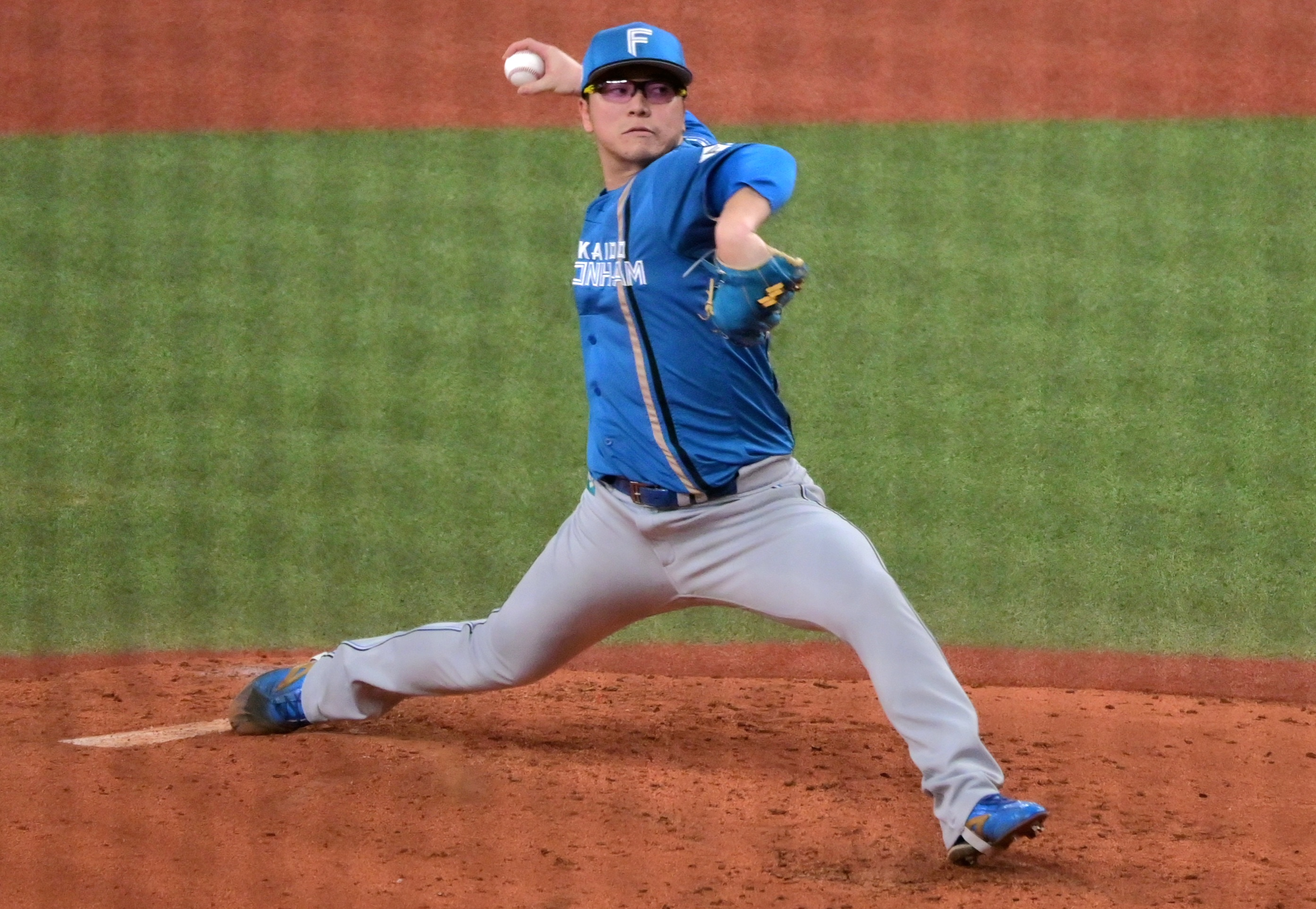

Hokkaido Nippon-Ham Fighters – No. 13
- Pitcher
- Born: February 19, 1995 (age 31); Hitachiōmiya, Ibaraki, Japan
- Bats: Right Throws: Right

NPB debut
- April 2, 2023, for the Hokkaido Nippon-Ham Fighters

Career statistics (through 2024 season)
- Win–loss record: 2-5
- Earned Run Average: 4.16
- Strikeouts: 58
- Saves: 1
- Holds: 9
- Stats at Baseball Reference

Teams
- Hokkaido Nippon-Ham Fighters (2019–present)

Tsubasa Nabatame (生田目 翼, Nabatame Tsubasa; born February 19, 1995 in Hitachiōmiya, Ibaraki, Japan) is a Japanese professional baseball pitcher for the Hokkaido Nippon-Ham Fighters of Nippon Professional Baseball (NPB).
