= Hitachiōmiya =

Hitachiōmiya 常陸大宮市
- City
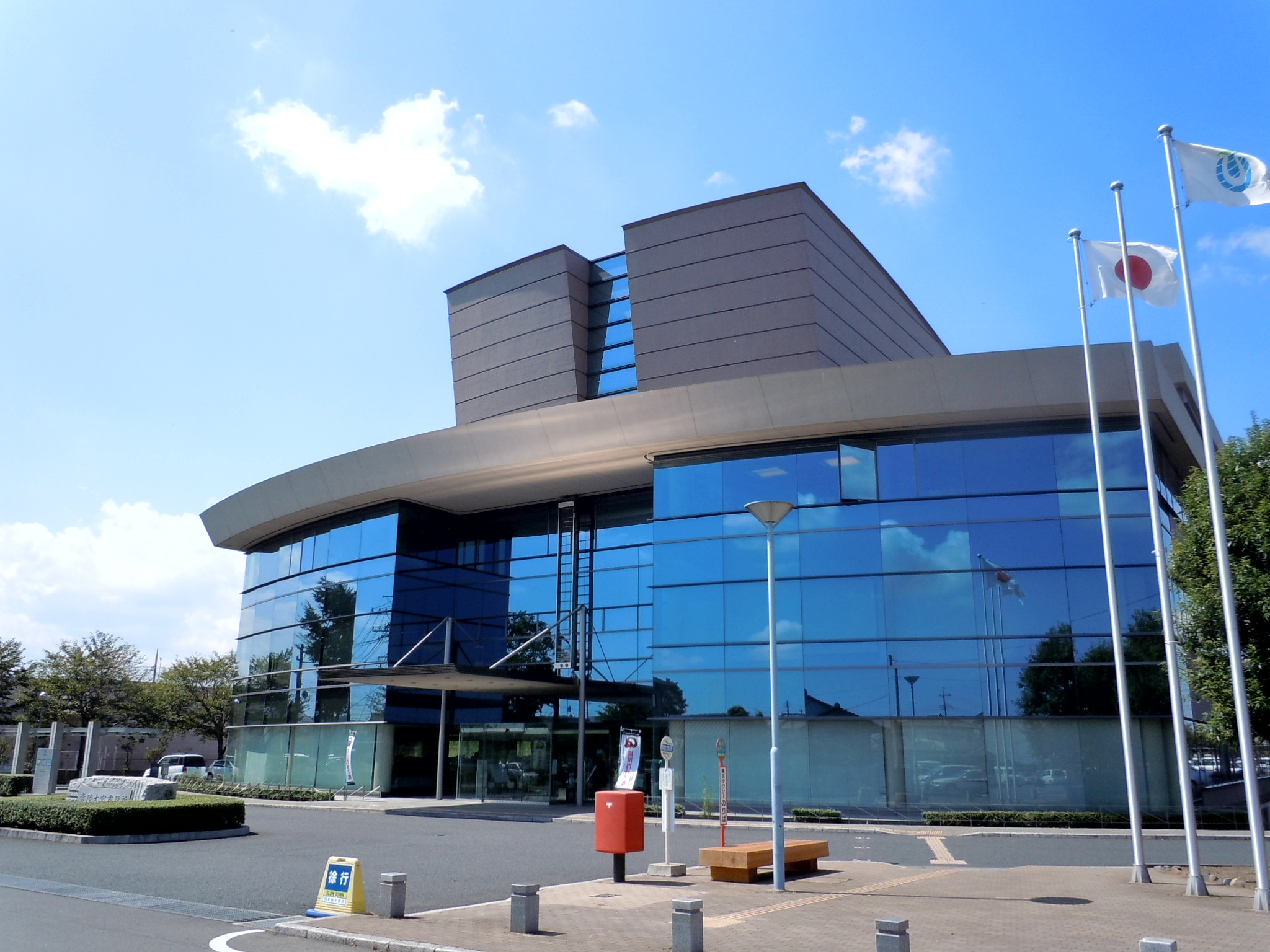
- Hitachiōmiya city hall

- Flag Seal

- Location of Hitachiōmiya in Ibaraki Prefecture

- Hitachiōmiya (Kanto Area) Hitachiōmiya (Ibaraki Prefecture)
- Coordinates: 36°32′33.1″N 140°24′39.2″E
- Country: Japan
- Region: Kantō
- Prefecture: Ibaraki

Area
  - Total: 348.45 km^{2} (134.54 sq mi)

Population (September 2020)
  - Total: 39,176
  - Density: 112.43/km^{2} (291.19/sq mi)
- Time zone: UTC+9 (Japan Standard Time)
- Phone number: 0295-52-1111
- Address: 3135-6 Nakatomi-chō, Hitachiōmiya-shi, Ibaraki-ken 319-2292
- Climate: Cfa
- Website: Official website
- Symbols
- Bird: Common kingfisher
- Flower: Rose
- Tree: Sakura

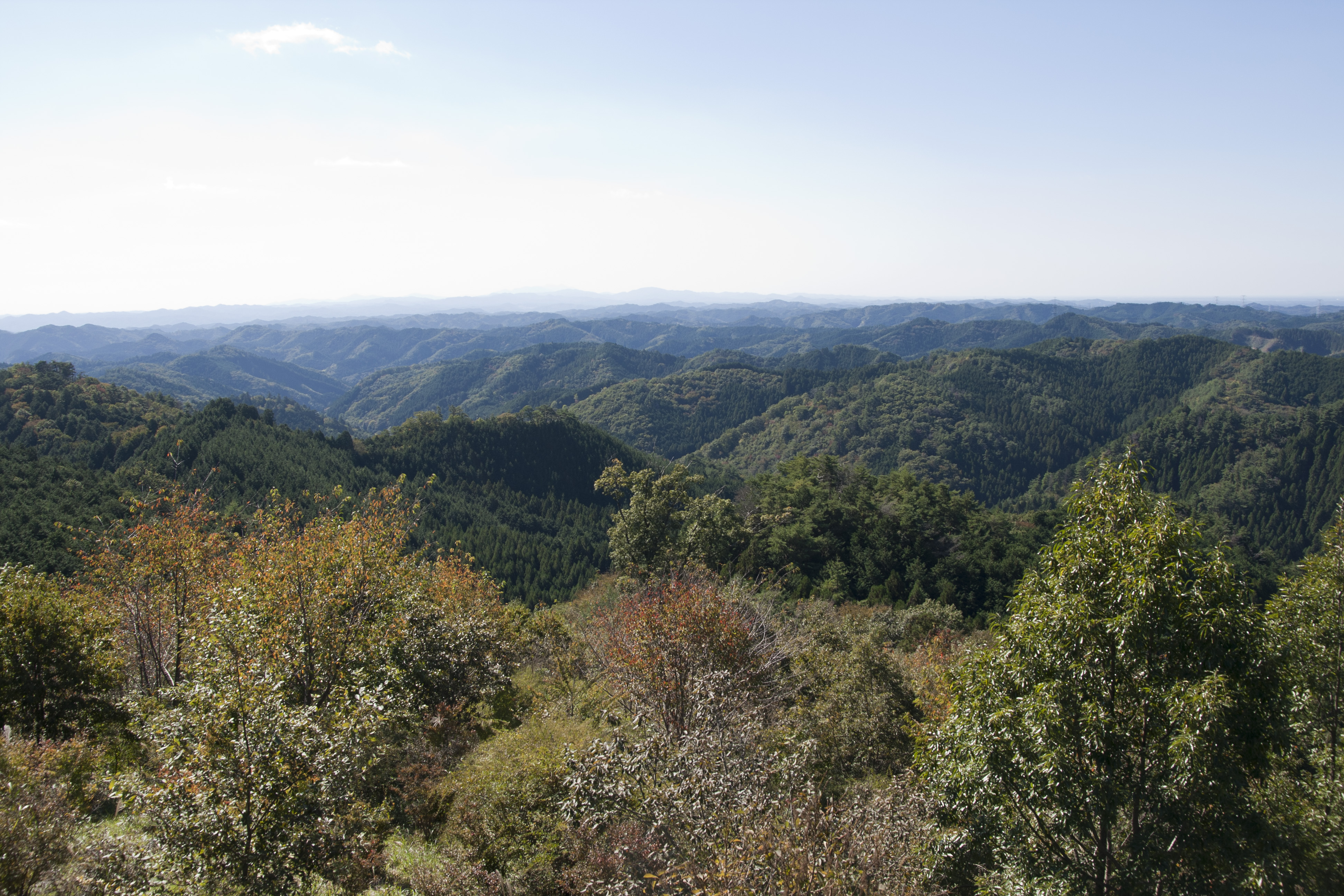
Yamizo Mountains from Mt.Shakujo

Hitachiōmiya (Japanese: 常陸大宮市, Hepburn: Hitachiōmiya-shi) is a city located in Ibaraki Prefecture, Japan. As of 1 July 2020, the city had an estimated population of 39,281 in 16.047 households and a population density of 220 persons per km^{2}. The percentage of the population aged over 65 was 37.6%. The total area of the city is 348.45 square kilometres (134.54 sq mi).

== Geography ==
Hitachiōmiya is located in the northwestern part of Ibaraki Prefecture, at the eastern foot of the Yamizo Mountains, with 59% of the city area classified as forest and mountains. The Kuji River runs from north to south in the eastern part of the city, along which Japan National Route 118 and the JR Suigun Line pass. The city center is located in the southeast. The Naka River flows in the southwestern part of the city.

=== Surrounding municipalities ===
Ibaraki Prefecture

- Hitachiōta
- Naka
- Shirosato
- Daigo

Tochigi Prefecture

- Nasukarasuyama
- Nakagawa

=== Climate ===
Hitachiōmiya has a humid continental climate (Köppen Cfa) characterized by warm summers and cold winters with heavy snowfall. The average annual temperature in Hitachiōmiya is 12.9 °C (55.2 °F). The average annual rainfall is 1,363.7 mm (53.69 in) with September as the wettest month. The temperatures are highest on average in August, at around 24.7 °C (76.5 °F), and lowest in January, at around 1.6 °C (34.9 °F).

Climate data for Hitachiōmiya (1991−2020 normals, extremes 1978−present)
Month	Jan	Feb	Mar	Apr	May	Jun	Jul	Aug	Sep	Oct	Nov	Dec	Year
Record high °C (°F)	18.1 (64.6)	23.0 (73.4)	25.5 (77.9)	30.1 (86.2)	33.3 (91.9)	34.5 (94.1)	37.2 (99.0)	37.0 (98.6)	36.3 (97.3)	33.0 (91.4)	24.0 (75.2)	24.7 (76.5)	37.2 (99.0)
Mean daily maximum °C (°F)	8.8 (47.8)	9.6 (49.3)	12.9 (55.2)	18.1 (64.6)	22.5 (72.5)	25.1 (77.2)	28.8 (83.8)	30.3 (86.5)	26.7 (80.1)	21.3 (70.3)	16.1 (61.0)	11.1 (52.0)	19.3 (66.7)
Daily mean °C (°F)	1.6 (34.9)	2.6 (36.7)	6.0 (42.8)	11.2 (52.2)	16.1 (61.0)	19.7 (67.5)	23.5 (74.3)	24.7 (76.5)	21.1 (70.0)	15.3 (59.5)	9.3 (48.7)	3.9 (39.0)	12.9 (55.3)
Mean daily minimum °C (°F)	−4.2 (24.4)	−3.5 (25.7)	−0.2 (31.6)	4.8 (40.6)	10.3 (50.5)	15.4 (59.7)	19.7 (67.5)	20.7 (69.3)	17.0 (62.6)	10.5 (50.9)	3.7 (38.7)	−1.8 (28.8)	7.7 (45.9)
Record low °C (°F)	−11.8 (10.8)	−12.3 (9.9)	−9.0 (15.8)	−5.0 (23.0)	−0.4 (31.3)	6.1 (43.0)	10.7 (51.3)	11.1 (52.0)	5.8 (42.4)	−1.0 (30.2)	−4.7 (23.5)	−9.2 (15.4)	−12.3 (9.9)
Average precipitation mm (inches)	40.3 (1.59)	44.4 (1.75)	89.0 (3.50)	112.6 (4.43)	136.4 (5.37)	147.9 (5.82)	184.2 (7.25)	149.5 (5.89)	187.0 (7.36)	159.9 (6.30)	72.6 (2.86)	42.1 (1.66)	1,363.7 (53.69)
Average precipitation days (≥ 1.0 mm)	4.5	5.3	8.9	10.1	11.4	12.7	13.3	10.4	11.7	10.6	7.0	5.0	110.9
Mean monthly sunshine hours	203.8	189.5	196.1	192.5	188.9	134.9	145.4	170.9	136.6	149.4	165.7	191.6	2,063
Source: Japan Meteorological Agency

== Demographics ==
Per Japanese census data, the population of Hitachiōmiya has been declining over the past 70 years.

Historical population
Year	Pop.	±%
1950	69,209	—
1960	61,238	−11.5%
1970	52,500	−14.3%
1980	50,332	−4.1%
1990	49,670	−1.3%
2000	48,964	−1.4%
2010	45,178	−7.7%
2020	39,267	−13.1%

== History ==
The town of Ōmiya was created within Naka District with the establishment of the modern municipalities system on April 1, 1889. The city of Hitachiōmiya was established on October 16, 2004, from the merger of Ōmiya with the neighboring villages of Miwa and Ogawa (all from Naka District), the town of Yamagata, and the village of Gozenyama (both from Higashiibaraki District).

== Government ==
Hitachiōmiya has a mayor-council form of government with a directly elected mayor and a unicameral city council of 18 members. Hitachiōmiya contributes one member to the Ibaraki Prefectural Assembly. In terms of national politics, the city is divided between Ibaraki 1st district and Ibaraki 5th district of the lower house of the Diet of Japan.

== Economy ==
The economy of Hitachiōmiya is primarily agricultural.

== Education ==
Hitachiōmiya has 11 public elementary schools and five public middle schools operated by the city government, and two public high schools operated by the Ibaraki Prefectural Board of Education.

== Transportation ==
=== Railway ===
JR East –Suigun Line

- Hitachi-Ōmiya – Tamagawamura – Nogamihara – Yamagatajuku – Naka-Funyū – Shimo-Ogawa

=== Highway ===
- National Route 118
- National Route 123
- National Route 293

== Local attractions ==
- Torinokosan Shinto Shrine
- Michi-no-Eki Hitachi Omiya Kawa Plaza
- Hosenji
- Hitachiomiya City Historical and Folk Museum

== Notable people from Hitachiōmiya ==
- Miho Shiraishi, actress
- Dōmei Yakazu, physician
