= Ōmiya (surname) =

Ōmiya, Omiya, Oomiya or Ohmiya (written: 大宮, 近江谷 or おおみや in hiragana) is a Japanese surname. Notable people with the surname include:

- Anna Ohmiya (近江谷 杏菜, born 1989), Japanese curler
- Masashi Omiya (大宮 政志, born 1938), Japanese cyclist
- Teiji Ōmiya (大宮 悌二, 1918–1994), Japanese voice actor and actor
- Yoshiyuki Ohmiya (近江谷 好幸, born 1959), Japanese curler and curling coach

Oumiya (written: 近江屋 or おうみや in hiragana) is a separate surname, though it can be romanized the same way. Notable people with the surname include:

- Nobuhiro Omiya (近江屋 信広, born 1949), Japanese politician

== Fictional characters ==
- Shinobu Omiya (大宮 忍), character in the anime/manga series Kin-iro Mosaic
- Isami Omiya (大宮 勇), character in the anime/manga series Kin-iro Mosaic
