= Hitachi-Daigo Station =

Railway station in Daigo, Ibaraki Prefecture, Japan

Hitachi-Daigo Station 常陸大子駅
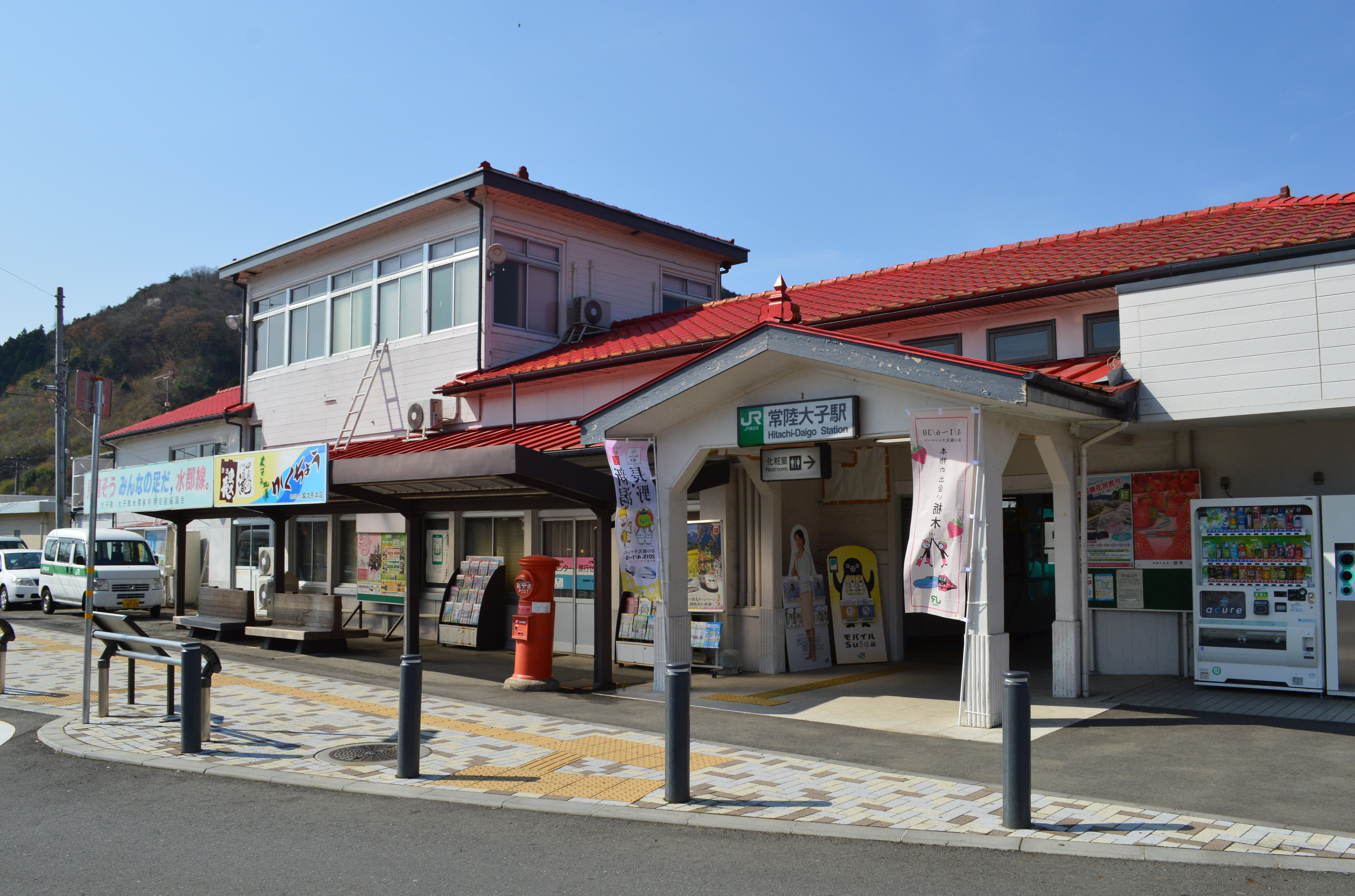
- Hitachi-Daigo Station in April 2015

General information
- Location: Daigo 710, Daigo-machi, Kuji-gun, Ibaraki-ken 319-3526; Japan
- Coordinates: 36.7711°N 140.3511°E
- Operator: JR East
- Line: ■ Suigun Line
- Distance: 55.6 km from Mito
- Platforms: 1 island + 1 side platform

Other information
- Status: Staffed (Midori no Madoguchi)
- Website: Official website

History
- Opened: March 10, 1927

Passengers
- FY2019: 255

Services
Preceding station	JR East	Following station
Fukuroda towards Mito	Suigun Line	Shimonomiya towards Kōriyama
Location
- Location within Ibaraki Prefecture Location within Japan

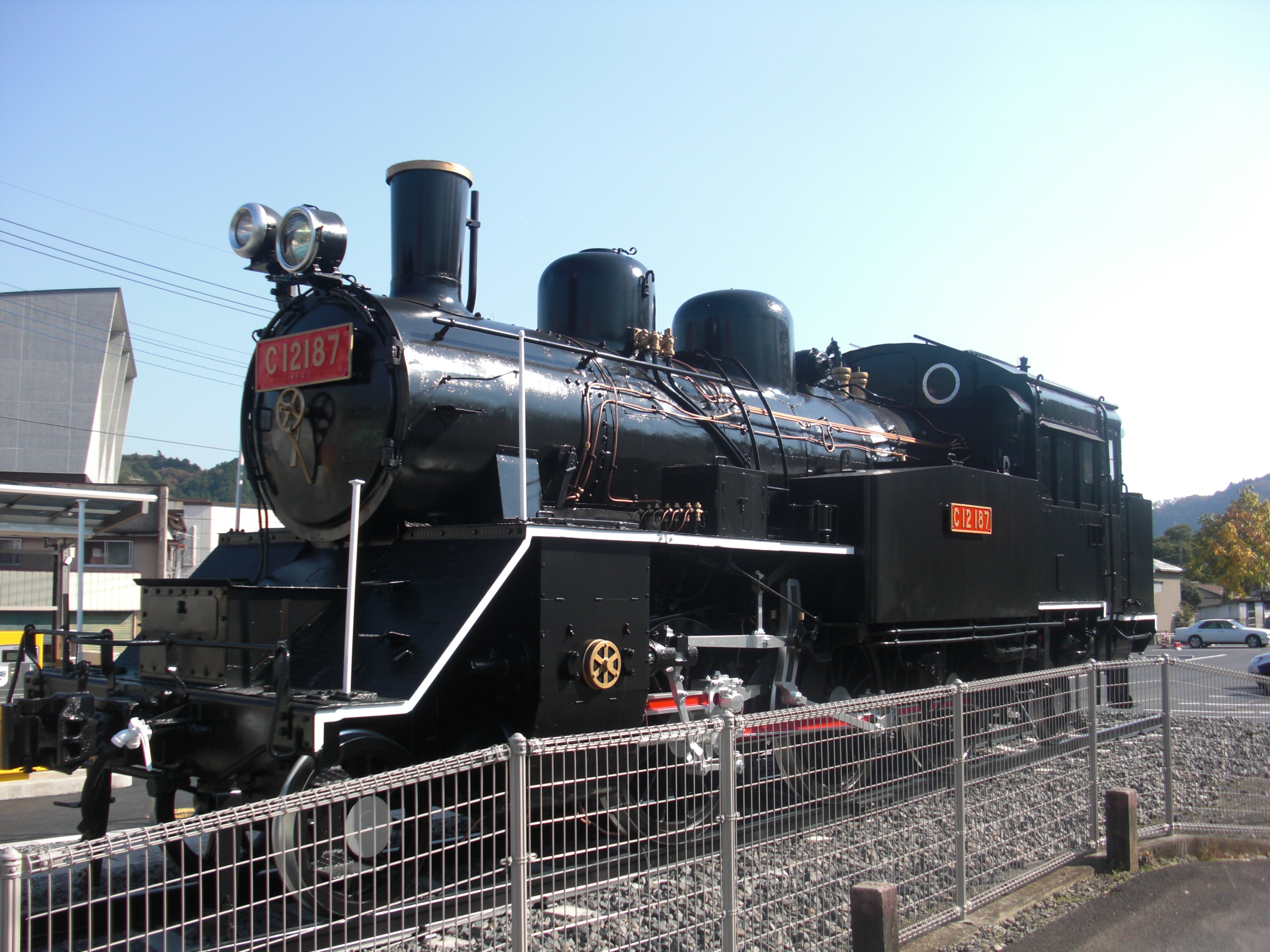
JNR Class C12 steam locomotive at Hitachi-Daigo Station

Hitachi-Daigo Station (常陸大子駅, Hitachi-Daigo-eki) is a passenger railway station in the town of Daigo, Kuji District, Ibaraki Prefecture, operated by East Japan Railway Company (JR East).

== Lines ==
Hitachi-Daigo Station is served by the Suigun Line, and is located 55.6 rail kilometers from the official starting point of the line at Mito Station.

== Station layout ==
The station consists of a single side platform and a single island platform connected to the station building by a footbridge. The station has a Midori no Madoguchi staffed ticket office. A JNR Class C12 steam locomotive is on static display in front of the station.

=== Platforms ===
1	■ Suigun Line	for Hitachi-Ōmiya and Mito
2, 3	■ Suigun Line	for Iwaki-Tanakura, Iwaki-Ishikawa and Kōriyama

== History ==
Hitachi-Daigo Station opened on March 10, 1927. The station was absorbed into the JR East network upon the privatization of the Japanese National Railways (JNR) on April 1, 1987.

== Passenger statistics ==
In fiscal 2019, the station was used by an average of 255 passengers daily (boarding passengers only).

== Surrounding area ==
- National Route 118
- National Route 461
- Daigo Town Hall
- Daigo Post Office
- Daigo Onsen

== See also ==
- List of railway stations in Japan
