= Hitachi-Ōmiya Station =

Railway station in Hitachiōmiya, Ibaraki Prefecture, Japan

Hitachi-Ōmiya Station 常陸大宮駅
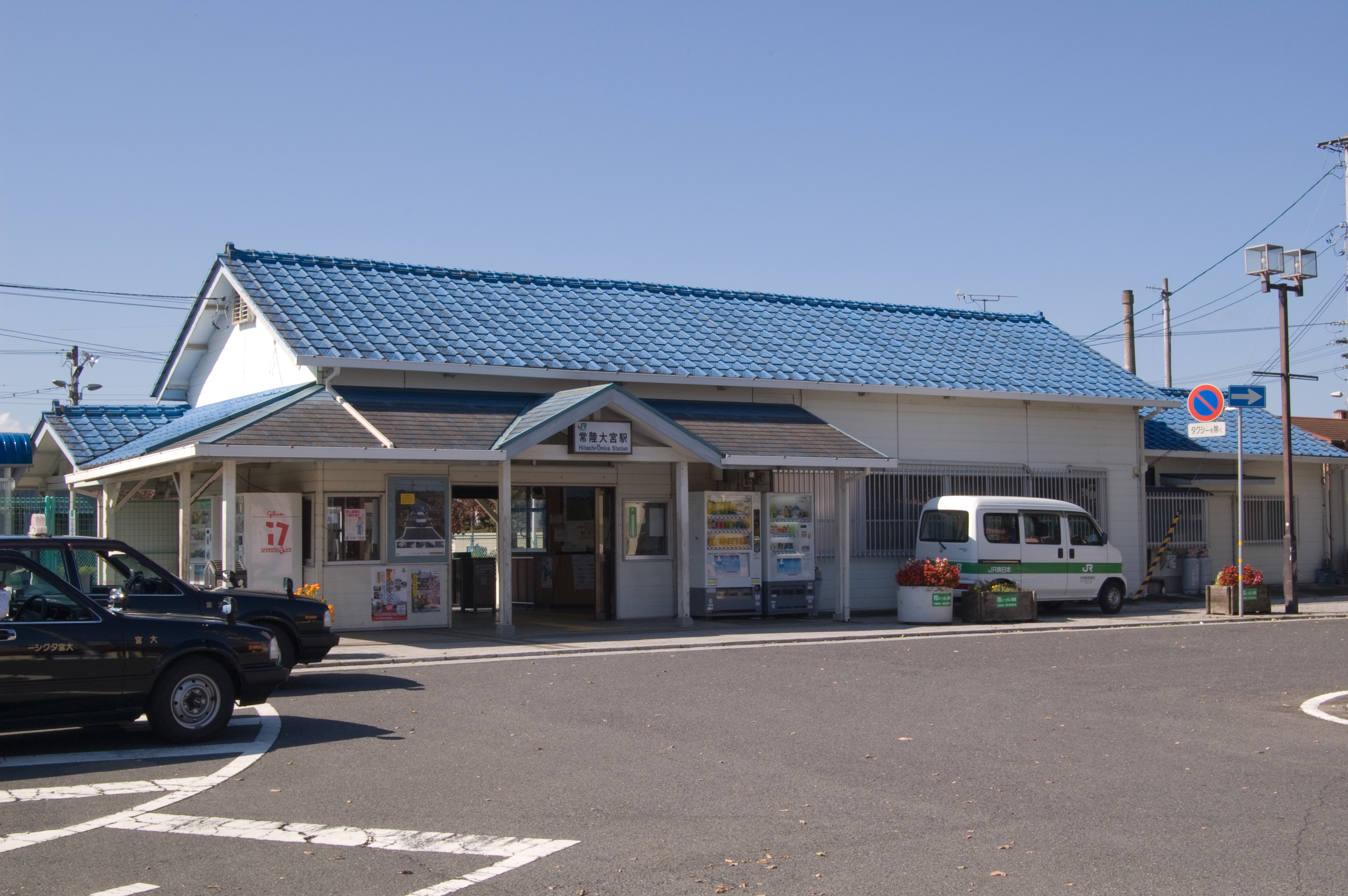
- Hitachi-Ōmiya Station in October 2007

General information
- Location: Minami-machi 966, Hitachiōmiya-shi, Ibaraki-ken 319-2263; Japan
- Coordinates: 36.5473°N 140.4127°E
- Operator: JR East
- Line: ■ Suigun Line
- Distance: 23.4 km from Mito
- Platforms: 2 side platforms

Other information
- Status: Staffed
- Website: Official website

History
- Opened: October 23, 1918

Passengers
- FY2019: 935

Services
Preceding station	JR East	Following station
Shizu towards Mito	Suigun Line	Tamagawamura towards Kōriyama
Location
- Location within Ibaraki Prefecture Location within Japan

Hitachi-Ōmiya Station (常陸大宮駅, Hitachi-Ōmiya-eki) is a passenger railway station in the city of Hitachiōmiya, Ibaraki, Japan operated by East Japan Railway Company (JR East).

== Lines ==
Hitachi-Ōmiya Station is served by the Suigun Line, and is located 23.4 rail kilometers from the official starting point of the line at Mito Station.

== Station layout ==
The station has two opposed side platforms connected to the station building by a level crossing. The station is staffed.

=== Platforms ===
1	■ Suigun Line	for Kami-Sugaya and Mito
2	■ Suigun Line	for Hitachi-Daigo and Kōriyama

== History ==
Hitachi-Ōmiya Station opened on October 23, 1918 as a station on the Mito Railway which was nationalized on December 1, 1927. The station was absorbed into the JR East network upon the privatization of the Japanese National Railways (JNR) on April 1, 1987.

== Passenger statistics ==
In fiscal 2019, the station was used by an average of 935 passengers daily (boarding passengers only).

== Surrounding area ==
- National Route 118
- National Route 293
- Ōmiya Post Office

== See also ==
- List of railway stations in Japan
