= Japan National Route 461 =

Road in Japan

National Route 461
- 国道461号
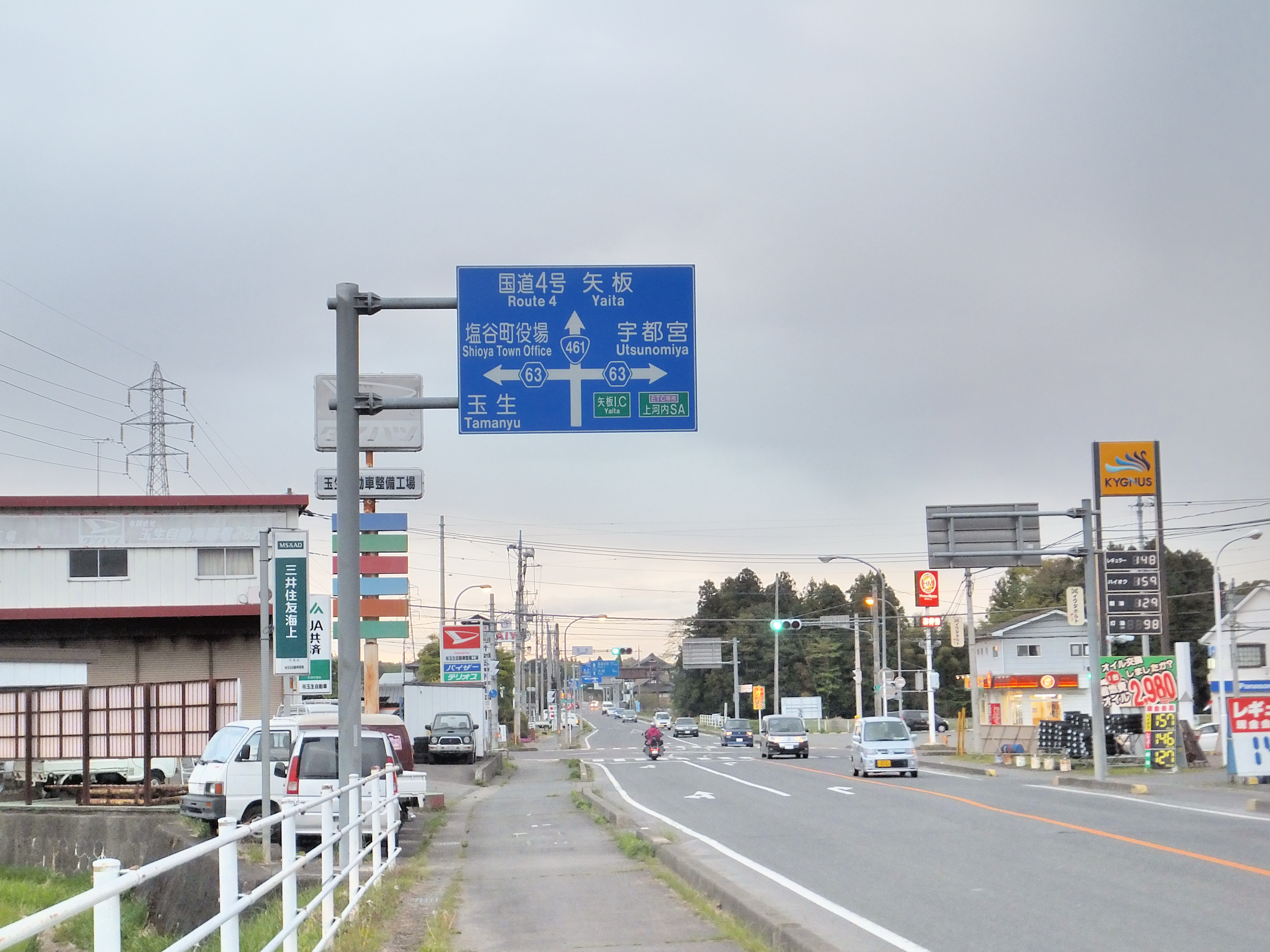

Route information
- Length: 135.0 km (83.9 mi)

Location
- Country: Japan

Highway system
- National highways of Japan; Expressways of Japan
← National Route 460	→ National Route 462

National Route 461 is a national highway of Japan connecting Nikkō, Tochigi and Takahagi, Ibaraki, with a total length of 135 km (83.89 mi).
