= Japan National Route 118 =

Road in Japan

National Route 118
- 国道118号
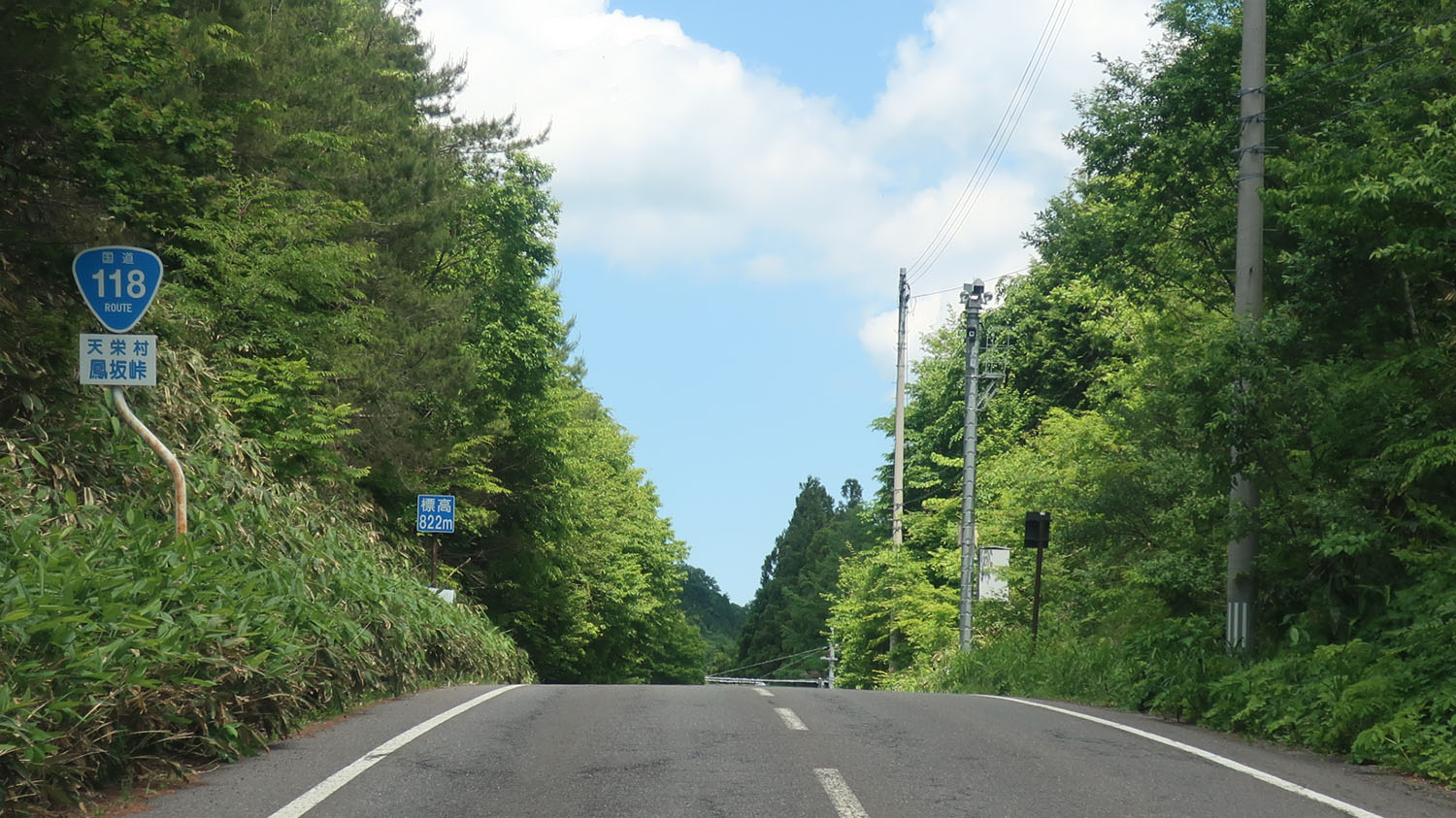

Route information
- Length: 206.1 km (128.1 mi)
- Existed: 1953–present

Major junctions
- South end: National Route 50 in Mito, Ibaraki
- North end: National Route 49 in Aizuwakamatsu, Fukushima

Location
- Country: Japan

Highway system
- National highways of Japan; Expressways of Japan
← National Route 117	→ National Route 119

National Route 118 is a national highway of Japan connecting Mito, Ibaraki, and Aizuwakamatsu, Fukushima, in Japan, with a total length of 206.1 km (128.06 mi).
