= 1998 Liberal Democratic Party presidential election =

Japanese political party leadership election

- 24 July 1998
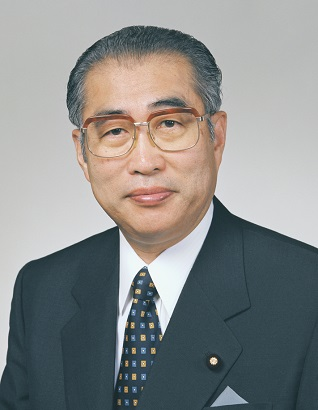

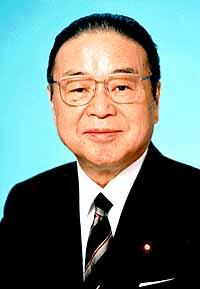

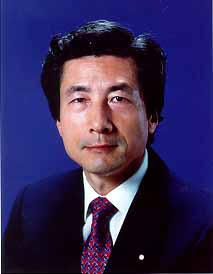
Candidate	Keizo Obuchi	Seiroku Kajiyama	Junichiro Koizumi
Leader's seat	Gunma 5th	Ibaraki 4th	Kanagawa 11th
Total	225 (54.74%)	102 (24.82%)	84 (20.44%)
President before election
Ryutaro Hashimoto
Elected President
Keizō Obuchi

The 1998 Liberal Democratic Party presidential election was held on 7 July 1998 to elect the President of the Liberal Democratic Party of Japan (LDP).

== Overview ==
Following the LDP's victory in the 1996 Japanese general election, and Ryutaro Hashimoto replacing Tomiichi Murayama as prime minister, two trends emerged within the LDP. One group, led by Secretary-General of the Liberal Democratic Party Koichi Kato and Deputy Secretary-General Hiromu Nonaka, emphasized the LDP-SDP cooperation. The other group distanced themselves from the SDP and favoured a "conservative-conservative coalition" with Ichiro Ozawa, leader of the Liberal Party. The conservative-conservative coalition faction included former prime minister Yasuhiro Nakasone, Shizuka Kamei, and Seiroku Kajiyama.

In the 12 July 1998 Japanese House of Councillors election, news reports predicted a strong LDP victory. However, criticism gradually grew as the election approached due to Hashimoto's inconsistent statements regarding tax cuts. Koichi Kato expressed concern, saying, "If the LDP doesn't perform well, people will start calling for a Kajiyama cabinet". Late at night on 12 July, before the vote count was even completed, Hashimoto announced his resignation as LDP president. The LDP won 44 seats, a significant drop from its previous total of 61. With Hashimoto's resignation, Kato was forced to take responsibility for the election defeat and was no longer eligible to succeed Hashimoto. The remaining viable candidates were narrowed down to Keizo Obuchi, chairman of the Obuchi faction and incumbent foreign minister, and Kajiyama, also a member of the Obuchi faction, who had been proactive in proposing policy proposals on financial issues.

On the day of the election, when it was reported that the Obuchi faction, the largest faction, was losing ground, faction leaders gathered at Noboru Takeshita's home. The leaders gathered and agreed to support Hashimoto's resignation and the chairman, Foreign Minister Obuchi Keizo, as his successor, and discussions with Takeshita were given priority over Hashimoto.

On 14 July, Obuchi faction leaders Tamisuke Watanuki, Kajiyama, Muraoka, Nonaka, and Tsukasa Nishida gathered at the Imperial Hotel. As previously discussed with Nonaka, Secretary-General Nishida opened the discussion by saying, "Let's go with Obuchi." At this point, Obuchi's unopposed victory was considered a certainty. That evening, Taku Yamazaki, Chairman of the Policy Research Council, visited Nonaka and announced, "I will soon leave the Watanabe faction and form the Near Future Politics Research Group (Yamazaki faction) and support Obuchi in the presidential election." The Obuchi faction's general meeting was scheduled for July 15 to officially decide on Obuchi's candidacy, but just before that, Kajiyama called a halt. Kajiyama declared his candidacy. He left the faction (along with Shinji Sato and Yoshihide Suga) and ran independently, resulting in a split election.

The attention on the election suddenly increased, but the LDP's strategy was that the party needed to avoid splitting into two in a battle where the outcome was already clear. The strategy thus developed was to field a "third candidate." This was one of the reasons behind Junichiro Koizumi's candidacy. Nonaka even said, "If Koizumi doesn't have enough endorsers, we'll lend them to him from the Obuchi faction". Koizumi's candidacy was also intended to reduce Kajiyama's share of the vote, thereby weakening his influence in the expected Obuchi cabinet after the election.

Makiko Tanaka described the presidential election as "a battle between an ordinary man (Obuchi), a military man (Kajiyama), and an eccentric (Koizumi)".

Tarō Asō, Hachiro Okonogi, Taro Kono, and Seiko Noda also voted for Kajiyama. The Mitsuzuka faction was initially divided into two groups: the Obuchi supporters led by Yoshirō Mori and the Kajiyama supporters led by anti-cabinet Kamei. However, a sense of crisis grew rapidly that the factions could become a "grass-cutting ground" for the Obuchi and Kajiyama camps and split apart, and they agreed to field either Mori or Koizumi as their own candidate. Mori, as a member of the executive committee, declined to run and supported Koizumi. Kamei and others, along with a group led by Yasuhiro Nakasone from the former Watanabe faction, would form the Post-Presidential Election Shisuikai.

The vote took place on July 24, and as initially predicted, Obuchi won by a landslide. However, Kajiyama, who was expected to receive around 50 votes, received 102 votes, exceeding triple digits, while Koizumi received only 84 votes, less than the total number of 87 Mitsuzuka faction members, placing him in third place with two abstentions and one no vote.

== Candidates ==
=== Declared ===
Candidate(s)	Date of birth	Current position	Party faction	Electoral district
Keizō Obuchi	25 June 1937 (age 62)	Minister for Foreign Affairs (since 1997); Member of the House of Representatives (since 1963) Previous offices held: Chief Cabinet Secretary (1987–1989)	Heisei Kenkyūkai (Obuchi)	Gunma 5th
Seiroku Kajiyama	27 March 1926 (age 72)	Member of the House of Representatives (1969–1976; since 1979) Previous offices held: Chief Cabinet Secretary (1996–1997); Secretary-General of the Liberal Democratic Party (1992–1993); Minister of Justice (1990); Minister of International Trade and Industry (1989); Minister of Home Affairs (1987–1988); Chairman of the National Public Safety Commission (1987–1988); Deputy Chief Cabinet Secretary (Political affairs) (1974); Speaker of the Ibaraki Prefectural Assembly (1967–1969); Member of the Ibaraki Prefectural Assembly (1958–1969)	None (former Heisei Kenkyūkai)	Ibaraki 4th
Junichiro Koizumi	8 January 1942 (age 56)	Member of the House of Representatives (since 1972) Previous offices held: Minister of Health, Labour and Welfare (1988–1989; since 1996); Minister for Internal Affairs and Communications (1992–1993)	Seiwa Seisaku Kenkyūkai (Mitsuzuka)	Kanagawa 11th

== Results ==
Full results
Candidate	Diet members		Local delegates		Total points	
Candidate	Votes	%	Votes	%	Total votes	%
Keizō Obuchi 当					225	54.74%
Seiroku Kajiyama					102	24.82%
Junichiro Koizumi					84	20.44%
Total	364	100.00%	47	100.00%	411	100.00%
Valid votes	364	99.73%	47	100.00%	411	99.76%
Invalid and blank votes	1	0.27%	0	0.00%	1	0.24%
Turnout	365	99.46%	47	100.00%	412	99.52%
Registered voters	367	100.00%	47	100.00%	414	100.00%
