= Yoji Nagaoka =

Japanese politician (born 1950)

Yōji Nagaoka
- 永岡 洋治

Member of the House of Representatives
- In office 27 April 2003 – 1 August 2005
- Preceded by: Kishirō Nakamura
- Succeeded by: Kishirō Nakamura
- Constituency: Ibaraki 7th

Personal details
- Born: 24 December 1950 Koga, Ibaraki, Japan
- Died: 1 August 2005 (aged 54) Tokyo, Japan
- Party: Liberal Democratic
- Spouse: Keiko Nagaoka (m. 1978)
- Education: University of Tokyo

Yōji Nagaoka (永岡洋治, Nagaoka Yoji; born 1950) was a Japanese politician and member of the House of Representatives (Japan), elected to represent Ibaraki 7th district as a member of the Liberal Democratic Party. He died by suicide on 1 August 2005.

== Early life ==
Nagaoka was born in Furukawa in 1950. He graduated in law from the University of Tokyo in 1975 and also held a degree from Harvard Business School. He worked in the Ministry of Agriculture, Forestry and Fisheries. He was elected to the House of Representatives in a by-election in 2003 triggered by Kishirō Nakamura's imprisonment on corruption charges.

== In office ==
Nagaoka held office from 27 April 2003 until his death on 1 August 2005. On 5 July 2005, Nagaoka voted to privatize the Japanese Post Office (subsequently Japan Post Network). Nagaoka was a member of the Kamei faction in the LDP at the time, and the Kamei faction opposed the privatization of the Post Office, so Nagaoka's vote in favour was seen as an act of disloyalty.

He attempted suicide at his home in Tokyo on 1 August 2005, and died in hospital later that day. He was 54.

== Aftermath ==
Leaders of the Kamei faction left the LDP and formed the People's New Party. Nagaoka's widow Keiko Nagaoka stood for his seat. Kishirō Nakamura won it, but Keiko Nagaoka did well enough to take a proportional seat in the National Diet as a member of the House of Representatives. She went on to take the seat from Nakamura in the 2021 Japanese general election and became Minister of Education, Culture, Sports, Science and Technology from 2022 to 2023.
