= Hayato Nakamura =

Japanese politician (born 1986)

- 中村 勇太

Member of the House of Representatives
- Incumbent
- Assumed office 30 October 2024
- Preceded by: Keiko Nagaoka
- Constituency: Ibaraki 7th

Member of the Ibaraki Prefectural Assembly
- In office 8 January 2019 – 26 September 2024
- Constituency: Koga City

Personal details
- Born: 18 October 1986 (age 39) Tokyo, Japan
- Party: Independent
- Parent: Kishirō Nakamura (father)
- Relatives: Tomi Nakamura (grandmother); Kishirō Nakamura (grandfather)
- Education: Seikei University

Hayato Nakamura (中村勇太, Nakamura Hayato; born 18 October 1986) is a Japanese politician serving as a member of the House of Representatives since 2024. From 2019 to 2024, he was a member of the Ibaraki Prefectural Assembly. He is the son of Kishirō Nakamura and the grandson of Kishirō Nakamura.
