= Furukawa (surname) =

Furukawa (written: 古川 or 古河, lit."old river") is a Japanese surname. Notable people with the surname include:

- Airi Furukawa (古川 愛李; born 1989), illustrator and former member of the Japanese idol girl group SKE48. She is a former member and leader of SKE48's Team KII
- Furukawa Ichibei (古河 市兵衛; 1832–1903), Japanese industrialist and copper mine magnate
- Keiko Furukawa (古川 圭子; born 1967), announcer for Mainichi Broadcasting System
- Kiichirō Furukawa (古川 麒一郎; 1929–2016), Japanese astronomer
- Lisa Furukawa (古川 梨沙; born 1976), Japanese-American pianist, singer and songwriter (formerly known as Lisa Furukawa Ray)
- Makoto Furukawa (古川 慎; born 1989), Japanese voice actor affiliated with Space Craft Group. His most notable role is in the anime One-Punch Man, as the main character, Saitama and Golden Time, as Banri Tada
- Makoto Furukawa (writer) (古川 真人; born 1988), Japanese writer
- Miki Furukawa (古川 美季; born 1979), Japanese musician, and former bass guitarist and singer for the Japanese rock band Supercar
- Motohisa Furukawa (古川 元久; born 1965), Japanese politician of the Democratic Party of Japan (DPJ), a member of the House of Representatives in the Diet (national legislature)
- Narutoshi Furukawa (古川 成俊; 1900–1996), renowned Japanese photographer
- Roppa Furukawa (古川 緑波; 1903–1961), Japanese comedian
- Satoshi Furukawa (古川 聡; born 1964), JAXA astronaut
- Shuntaro Furukawa (古川 俊太郎; born 1972), Japanese businessman
- Takaharu Furukawa (古川 高晴; born 1984), Japanese archer
- Takashi Furukawa (古川 隆志; born 1981), former Japanese football player
- Takatoshi Furukawa (古川 孝敏; born 1987), Japanese professional basketball player who currently plays for Link Tochigi Brex in the National Basketball League (Japan)
- Takeshi Furukawa (古川 毅), Japanese-American composer, orchestrater and conductor. His works have spanned the concert stage, films, television, video games and advertising campaigns
- Takumi Furukawa (古川 卓己; 1917–2018), Japanese film director
- Tashiro Furukawa (古河 太四郎; 1845–1907), Japanese educator
- Toshiharu Furukawa (古川 俊治; born 1963), Japanese medical doctor, attorney, and politician
- Tomo Furukawa (古川 とも), vocalist for Guniw Tools
- Toshio Furukawa (古川 登志夫; born 1946), Japanese voice actor
- Tsuyoshi Furukawa (古川 毅; born 1972), former Japanese football player* Furukawa Hompo
- Tsuyoshi Furukawa (古川 毅; born 2000), Japanese singer and actor, member of boy group Super★Dragon
- Yasushi Furukawa (disambiguation), multiple people
- Yoshihisa Furukawa (古川 禎久; born 1965), Japanese politician
- Yuki Furukawa (古川 雄輝; born 1987), Japanese actor
- Yūta Furukawa (古川 雄大; born 1987), Japanese actor, singer, songwriter and model

== Fictional characters ==
- Nagisa Furukawa, main character in the visual novel Clannad
