= Ibaraki Prefectural Assembly =

Parliament of Ibaraki, Japan

The Ibaraki Prefectural Assembly (茨城県議会, Ibaraki-ken Gikai) is the prefectural parliament of Ibaraki Prefecture.

== Members ==
As of 23 August 2019

Constituency	Members	Party
Miho Village and Ami Town	Mamoru Hanashi	Ibaraki LDP
Tōkai Village	Kenjirō Shimoji	Ibaraki LDP
Omitama City	Kōzō Shimada	Ibaraki LDP
Tsukubamirai City	Hiroshi Yamanoi	Ibaraki LDP
Hokota City, Ibaraki Town, and Ōarai Town	Tōru Honzawa	Independent
Hokota City, Ibaraki Town, and Ōarai Town	Shigeyuki Hasegawa	Ibaraki LDP
Kamisu City	Masayoshi Saijō	Ibaraki LDP
Kamisu City	Yasunari Murata	Ibaraki LDP
Sakuragawa City	Nobuo Hakuta	Ibaraki LDP
Kasumigaura City	Kiyoshi Totsuka	Independent
Inashiki City and Kawachi Town	Noriyuki Hosoya	Ibaraki LDP
Bandō City, Goka Town, and Sakai Town	Hayato Ishitsuka	Ibaraki LDP
Bandō City, Goka Town, and Sakai Town	Noboru Hanmura	Ibaraki LDP
Chikusei City	Emiko Shidara	Ibaraki Kenmin Forum
Chikusei City	Kazutoshi Mizugaki	Ibaraki LDP
Naka City	Makoto Endō	Ibaraki Kenmin Forum
Hitachiōmiya City	Sadayuki Suzuki	Ibaraki LDP
Moriya City	Issei Ogawa	Ibaraki LDP
Itako City and Namegata City	Masataka Fujishima	Independent
Kashima City	Shin’ichi Taguchi	Ibaraki LDP
Hitachinaka City	Tōru Umino	Ibaraki LDP
Hitachinaka City	Tatsuya Isozaki	Ibaraki LDP
Hitachinaka City	Hidetoshi Futakawa	Ibaraki Kenmin Forum
Tsukuba City	Taiko Yamanaka	JCP
Tsukuba City	Kazuya Tsukamoto	Ibaraki LDP
Tsukuba City	Keiko Tamura	Komeito
Tsukuba City	Masashi Suzuki	Ibaraki LDP
Tsukuba City	Kōji Hoshida	Ibaraki LDP
Ushiku City	Tsuneo Yamaoka	Ibaraki LDP
Ushiku City	Kazutoshi Numata	Ibaraki LDP
Toride City	Osamu Nakamura	Ibaraki LDP
Toride City	Masaya Kawaguchi	Independent
Kasama City	Yōji Tokoi	Ibaraki LDP
Kasama City	Norio Murakami	Ibaraki LDP
Takahagi City and Kitaibaraki City	Shigeru Toyoda	Independent
Takahagi City and Kitaibaraki City	Takuya Okada	Ibaraki LDP
Hitachiōta City and Daigo Town	Hajime Nishino	Ibaraki LDP
Hitachiōta City and Daigo Town	Kunikazu Ishii	Ibaraki LDP
Jōsō City and Yachiyo Town	Teruhisa Kaneko	Ibaraki LDP
Jōsō City and Yachiyo Town	Toshio Iida	Jimin Kensei Club
Shimotsuma City	Akio Iitsuka	Ibaraki LDP
Ryūgasaki City and Tone Town	Ryūji Sakamoto	Ibaraki LDP
Ryūgasaki City and Tone Town	Isamu Hagiwara	Ibaraki LDP
Yūki City	Heihachirō Usui	Jimin Kensei Club
Ishioka City	Yōji Yajima	Ibaraki LDP
Ishioka City	Kazuyuki Toida	Ibaraki LDP
Koga City	Katsunori Takahashi	Ibaraki LDP
Koga City	Hayato Nakamura	Independent
Koga City	Etsuo Morita	Ibaraki LDP
Tsuchiura City	Isao Yashima	Komeito
Tsuchiura City	Katsunori Izawa	Ibaraki LDP
Tsuchiura City	Mariko Andō	Ibaraki LDP
Hitachi City	Hiroaki Takayasu	Ibaraki Kenmin Forum
Hitachi City	Hideaki Saitō	Ibaraki Kenmin Forum
Hitachi City	Shūji Muramoto	Komeito
Hitachi City	Gen’ichirō Fukuchi	Ibaraki LDP
Mito City and Shirosato Town	Jun’ichi Takatsukuri	CDP
Mito City and Shirosato Town	Susumu Takasaki	Komeito
Mito City and Shirosato Town	Shizuma Tachi	Ibaraki LDP
Mito City and Shirosato Town	Takashi Kawazu	Ibaraki LDP
Mito City and Shirosato Town	Akiyoshi Katō	Ibaraki LDP
Mito City and Shirosato Town	Kana Ejiri	JCP
