= Moichi Miyazaki =

Japanese politician (1917–2004)

- 宮崎 茂一
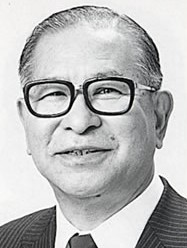

Director-General of the Science and Technology Agency
- In office 27 December 1988 – 2 June 1989
- Prime Minister: Noboru Takeshita
- Preceded by: Soichiro Ito
- Succeeded by: Kishirō Nakamura

Member of the House of Representatives
- In office 10 December 1972 – 27 September 1996
- Preceded by: Eikichi Kanbayashiyama
- Succeeded by: Constituency abolished
- Constituency: Kagoshima 1st

Personal details
- Born: 15 February 1917 Taniyama, Kagoshima, Japan
- Died: 16 February 2004 (aged 87)
- Party: Liberal Democratic
- Education: Tokyo Imperial University

Moichi Miyazaki (宮崎 茂一, Miyazaki Moichi; 15 February 1917 – 16 February 2004) was a Japanese politician, a member of the National Diet and a Cabinet member. He was a bureaucrat of Home Ministry, Economic Planning Agency, and Ministry of Transport before he became a politician.

== Biography ==
He was born in Taniyama (now part of Kagoshima City), Kagoshima Prefecture. In 1933, he finished Kagoshima Prefectural Daini-Kagoshima Middle School (now Kagoshima Prefectural Konan High School) in the fourth grade of five-year course to advance on to Seventh Higher School Zoshikan (now Kagoshima University). He graduated from Seventh Higher School Zoshikan in 1936 and from Department of Civil Engineering, Faculty of Engineering, Tokyo Imperial University (now University of Tokyo) in 1939. In the year of his university graduation, he entered the Civil Engineering Bureau of Home Ministry. He served as the Director-Generals of some bureaus of Ministry of Transport in the 1960's.

He was first elected to a member of the House of Representatives of the National Diet in 1972 and was elected 8 times. He served as Director General of the Science and Technology Agency in the Cabinet of Noboru Takeshita from December 27, 1988 to June 2, 1989. He also served as the Chairs of the Committee on Judicial Affairs and the Committee on Communications of the House of Representatives.
