= Ibaraki 7th district =

- Parliamentary constituency for the Japanese House of Representatives
- Numbered map of Ibaraki Prefecture single-member districts
- Prefecture: Ibaraki
- Proportional District: Northern Kanto
- Electorate: 327,158

Current constituency
- Created: 1994
- Seats: One
- Party: Independent
- Representatives: Hayato Nakamura
- Municipalities: Cities of Bandō, Jōsō, Koga, Shimotsuma and Yuki; Districts of Sashima and Yūki

Ibaraki 7th district (茨城県第7区, Ibaraki-ken dai-nanaku or simply 茨城7区, Ibaraki-nanaku ) is a single-member constituency of the House of Representatives in the national Diet of Japan located in Ibaraki Prefecture.

== Areas covered ==
=== Since 2022 ===
- Bandō
- Jōsō
- Koga
- Shimotsuma
- Yuki
- Sashima District
- Yūki District

=== 2013 - 2022 ===
- Bandō
- Jōsō
- Koga
- Part of Shimotsuma
- Yuki
- Sashima District
- Yūki District

=== 1994 - 2013 ===
- Iwai
- Mitsukaido
- Koga
- Yuki
- Sashima District
- Yūki District

== List of representatives ==
Election	Representative	Party	Notes
1996	Kishirō Nakamura	Independent	Lost seat because of criminal conviction in January 2003
2000	Kishirō Nakamura	Independent	Lost seat because of criminal conviction in January 2003
2003 by-el	Yoji Nagaoka	LDP	Died by suicide on August 1, 2005.
2003	Yoji Nagaoka	LDP	Died by suicide on August 1, 2005.
2005	Kishirō Nakamura	Independent	
2009	Kishirō Nakamura	Independent	
2012	Kishirō Nakamura	Independent	
2014	Kishirō Nakamura	Independent	
2017	Kishirō Nakamura	Independent	
2017	Kishirō Nakamura	CDP	
2021	Keiko Nagaoka	LDP	
2024	Hayato Nakamura	Independent	
2026	Hayato Nakamura	Independent	

== Election results ==
=== 2026 ===
2026
Party	Candidate	Votes	%	±%
Independent	Hayato Nakamura	84,930	52.5	▼0.47
LDP	Keiko Nagaoka (Incumbent) (Won PR seat)	76,700	47.5	▲0.47
Majority		8,230	5.0	▼1.06
Registered electors		318,124		
Turnout		161,630	52.50	▼0.02
Independent hold				

=== 2024 ===
2024
Party	Candidate	Votes	%	±%
Independent	Hayato Nakamura	87,187	53.03	New
LDP	Keiko Nagaoka (Incumbent) (Won PR seat)	77,224	46.97	▲0.46
Majority		9,963	6.06	
Registered electors		322,657		
Turnout			52.52	▼1.19
Independent gain from LDP				

=== 2021 ===
2021
Party	Candidate	Votes	%	±%
LDP	Keiko Nagaoka	74,362	46.51	▲7.04
CDP	Kishirō Nakamura (Incumbent) (Won PR seat)	70,843	44.31	New
Ishin	Nobuaki Mizunashi	14,683	9.18	New
Majority		3,519	2.20	
Registered electors		303,353		
Turnout			53.71	▲1.49
LDP gain from CDP				

=== 2017 ===
2017
Party	Candidate	Votes	%	±%
Independent	Kishirō Nakamura (Incumbent)	77,719	48.99	▼2.13
LDP	Keiko Nagaoka (Won PR seat)	62,617	39.47	▲1.51
JCP	Iwao Ishijima	18,308	11.54	▲0.62
Majority		15,102	9.52	
Registered electors		311,660		
Turnout			52.22	▼5.30
Independent hold				

=== 2014 ===
2014
Party	Candidate	Votes	%	±%
Independent	Kishirō Nakamura (Incumbent)	88,393	51.12	▲8.43
LDP	Keiko Nagaoka (Won PR seat)	65,638	37.96	▲6.61
JCP	Isamu Shirahata	18,883	10.92	▲0.94
Majority		22,755	13.16	
Registered electors		309,577		
Turnout			57.52	
Independent hold				

=== 2012 ===
2012
Party	Candidate	Votes	%	±%
Independent	Kishirō Nakamura (Incumbent)	81,157	42.69	▲5.70
LDP	Keiko Nagaoka (Won PR seat)	59,605	31.35	▲1.30
Restoration	Yosuke Tsutsui	23,344	12.28	New
Democratic	Kazumi Yanagida	18,983	9.98	▼21.55
JCP	Isamu Shirahata	7,034	3.70	N/A
Majority		21,552	11.34	
Registered electors		312,416		
Turnout				
Independent hold				

=== 2009 ===
2009
Party	Candidate	Votes	%	±%
Independent	Kishirō Nakamura (Incumbent)	78,999	36.99	▼5.15
Democratic	Kazumi Yanagida (Won PR seat)	67,331	31.53	▲15.80
LDP	Keiko Nagaoka (Won PR seat)	64,180	30.05	▼8.37
Happiness Realization	Akira Sugiura	3,062	1.43	New
Majority		11,668	5.46	
Registered electors		314,798		
Turnout				
Independent hold				

=== 2005 ===
2005
Party	Candidate	Votes	%	±%
Independent	Kishirō Nakamura	89,099	42.14	N/A
LDP	Keiko Nagaoka (Won PR seat)	81,230	38.42	▼25.76
Democratic	Hiroko Igarashi	33,266	15.73	▼13.55
JCP	Nobutoshi Inaba	7,854	3.71	▼2.83
Majority		7,869	3.72	
Registered electors		312,524		
Turnout				
Independent gain from LDP				

=== 2003 ===
2003
Party	Candidate	Votes	%	±%
LDP	Yoji Nagaoka	97,642	64.18	N/A
Democratic	Hiroko Igarashi	44,543	29.28	New
JCP	Takeo Taya	9,942	6.54	▲1.24
Majority		53,099	34.90	
Registered electors		313,913		
Turnout				
LDP hold				

=== 2003 by-election ===
2003 by-election
Party	Candidate	Votes	%	±%
LDP	Yoji Nagaoka	70,251	42.95	New
Independent	Eiichi Yoshihara	51,798	31.67	New
Liberal	Masako Katō	34,608	21.16	▲14.77
JCP	Nobutoshi Inaba	6,890	4.21	▼1.09
Majority		17,190	10.51	
Registered electors		313,340		
Turnout			53.80	
LDP gain from Independent				

=== 2000 ===
2000
Party	Candidate	Votes	%	±%
Independent	Kishirō Nakamura	88,095	44.15	▼9.49
Independent	Katsuya Tanaka	51,824	25.97	New
Independent	Yoji Nagaoka	36,307	18.19	New
Liberal	Itsuo Nomura	12,749	6.39	New
JCP	Nobutoshi Inaba	10,579	5.30	▼1.14
Majority		37,081	18.18	
Registered electors				
Turnout				
Independent hold				

=== 1996 ===
1996
Party	Candidate	Votes	%	±%
Independent	Kishirō Nakamura	100,175	53.64	New
New Frontier	Katsuya Tanaka	72,208	38.66	New
JCP	Osamu Ojima	12,032	6.44	New
Liberal League	Noriaki Maekawa	2,348	1.26	New
Majority		27,967	14.98	
Registered electors				
Turnout				
Independent win (new seat)				
