= Sanwa =

Sanwa (Japanese: 三和) may refer to:

== Places ==
- Sanwa, Hiroshima, a former town in Hiroshima Prefecture
- Miwa, Hiroshima, a former town in Hiroshima Prefecture (different romanization but same Japanese name)
- Sanwa, Ibaraki, a town in Ibaraki Prefecture
- Sanwa, Nagasaki, a former town in Nagasaki Prefecture
- Sanwa, Niigata, a former village in Niigata Prefecture
- Sanwa, slang for "San Joaquin Valley", California

== Companies ==
- Sanwa Electric Instrument, A Japanese company manufacturing digital and analog multimeters and electrical measurement instruments
- Sanwa Electronic, A Japanese company manufacturing radio-controlled model transmitters
- Sanwa Bank, A Japanese bank now part of The Bank of Tokyo-Mitsubishi UFJ
- Sanwa Group, A former keiretsu, or business group
