= Taniyama =

Taniyama (谷山 lit. "valley mountain") is a Japanese surname. Notable people with the surname include:

- Kishō Taniyama (谷山 紀章, born 1975), Japanese voice actor
- Takuya Taniyama (谷山 卓也, born 1965), Japanese karate instructor
- Yutaka Taniyama (谷山 豊, 1927–1958), Japanese mathematician

Fictional characters:

- Mai Taniyama, fictional character in Ghost Hunt

== See also ==
- Taniyama, Kagoshima, former city in Kagoshima prefecture, Japan. A part of present Kagoshima, Kagoshima.
- Taniyama Station (disambiguation)
