= Sashima, Ibaraki =

Dissolved municipality in Ibaraki prefecture, Japan

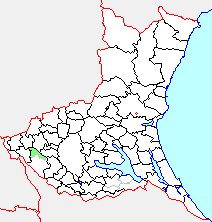
Map of Sashima, Ibaraki

Sashima (猿島町, Sashima-machi) was a town located in Sashima District, Ibaraki Prefecture, Japan.

== Population ==
As of 2003, the town had an estimated population of 15,145 and a density of 466.57 persons per km^{2}. The total area was 32.46 km^{2}.

== History ==
On March 22, 2005, Sashima, along with the city of Iwai, was merged to create the city of Bandō and no longer exists as an independent municipality.
