= Kishirō Nakamura =

Japanese politician

- 中村 喜四郎
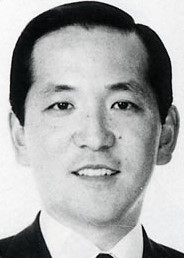
- Nakamura in 1989

Minister of Construction
- In office 12 December 1992 – 9 August 1993
- Prime Minister: Kiichi Miyazawa
- Preceded by: Taku Yamasaki
- Succeeded by: Kozo Igarashi

Director-General of the Science and Technology Agency Chairman of the Atomic Energy Commission
- In office 3 June 1989 – 10 August 1989
- Prime Minister: Sōsuke Uno
- Preceded by: Moichi Miyazaki
- Succeeded by: Eizaburō Saitō

Member of the House of Representatives; from Northern Kanto
- In office 12 September 2005 – 9 October 2024
- Preceded by: Yoji Nagaoka
- Succeeded by: Multi-member district
- Constituency: Ibaraki 7th (2005–2021); PR block (2021–2024)
- In office 10 December 1976 – 16 January 2003
- Preceded by: Munenori Akagi
- Succeeded by: Yoji Nagaoka
- Constituency: Ibaraki 3rd (1976–1996); Ibaraki 7th (1996–2003)

Personal details
- Born: Shin Nakamura; 10 April 1949 (age 77) Sakai, Ibaraki, Japan
- Party: Constitutional Democratic
- Other political affiliations: LDP (1976–1994); Independent (1994–2009; 2010–2020); JRP (2009–2010)
- Children: Hayato Nakamura
- Parent(s): Kishirō Nakamura; Tomi Nakamura
- Education: Nihon University

Kishirō Nakamura (中村 喜四郎, Nakamura Kishirō; born 10 April 1949) is a former Japanese politician who served as a member of the House of Representatives in the Diet. A native of Sakai in Ibaraki Prefecture and a graduate of Nihon University, he was elected to the House of Representatives for the first time in 1976.

After winning 14 elections in a row without a single defeat at the polls, he lost to Keiko Nagaoka in the election of 21 October 2021.

== Early life ==
Born in the town of Sakai in Ibaraki, his birth name was Shin Nakamura (中村伸). Both his parents were involved in politics and both became members of the Upper House of the Diet; his father and namesake from 1965 to 1971 and his mother, Tomi Nakamura, from 1972 to 1977. He graduated from Keimei Gakuen High School, a Protestant school in Akishima, Tokyo. In 1972, he graduated from the Nihon University College of Law; prior to graduating, he began working in the office of Kakuei Tanaka, serving as Tanaka's private secretary. Nakamura would later mimic how Tanaka interacted with his constituents and the contents of his speeches.

== Political career ==
In the 1976 Japanese general election, running as an independent, Nakamura was elected to the House of Representatives for Ibaraki District 3. For the election, he had changed his legal name to Kishiro Nakamura ("Junior"), and thus inherited the support network developed over the years by his father, Kishiro Nakamura ("Senior"). Nakamura later joined the Liberal Democratic Party.

=== Bribery Conviction ===
In 1994 Nakamura became involved in a political corruption case concerning construction companies buying favors from lawmakers, known as zenekon oshoku ("general contractor corruption"). Nakamura was arrested suspected of receiving bribes from the Kajima Corporation. Nakamura left the Liberal Democrats but managed to remain in the Diet throughout several elections by running as an independent while the case was going through the courts. In January 2003 he lost his appeal to the Supreme Court of Japan, his prison sentence was finalized and he lost his Diet seat.

=== Reelection & Retirement ===
Nakamura was released from prison in January 2004. In the 2005 general election he regained his seat in the Ibaraki 7th district and held unto it until 2021. In the 2021 general election he ran as a member of the Constitutional Democratic Party and lost for the first time in his career but managed to gain a seat through the Northern Kanto proportional representation block.

Before the 2024 general election Nakamura announced his retirement from politics. His son Hayato Nakamura ran in his stead and gained his father's old seat in the Ibaraki 7th.

== Notes ==
House of Representatives (Japan)
Preceded by Kanezō Muraoka	Chair, Committee on Construction of the House of Representatives; 1987–1988	Succeeded by Hosei Norota
Political offices
Preceded by Moichi Miyazaki	Director-General of the Science and Technology Agency; 1989	Succeeded by Eizaburō Saitō
Preceded by Moichi Miyazaki	Chairman of the Atomic Energy Commission of Japan; 1989	Succeeded by Eizaburō Saitō
Preceded by Taku Yamasaki	Minister of Construction; 1992–1993	Succeeded by Kozo Igarashi
Honorary titles
Preceded by Ichirō Ozawa	Youngest member of the House of Representatives; 1976–1979	Succeeded by Hajime Funada
