= Sakai, Ibaraki =

Sakai 境町
- Town
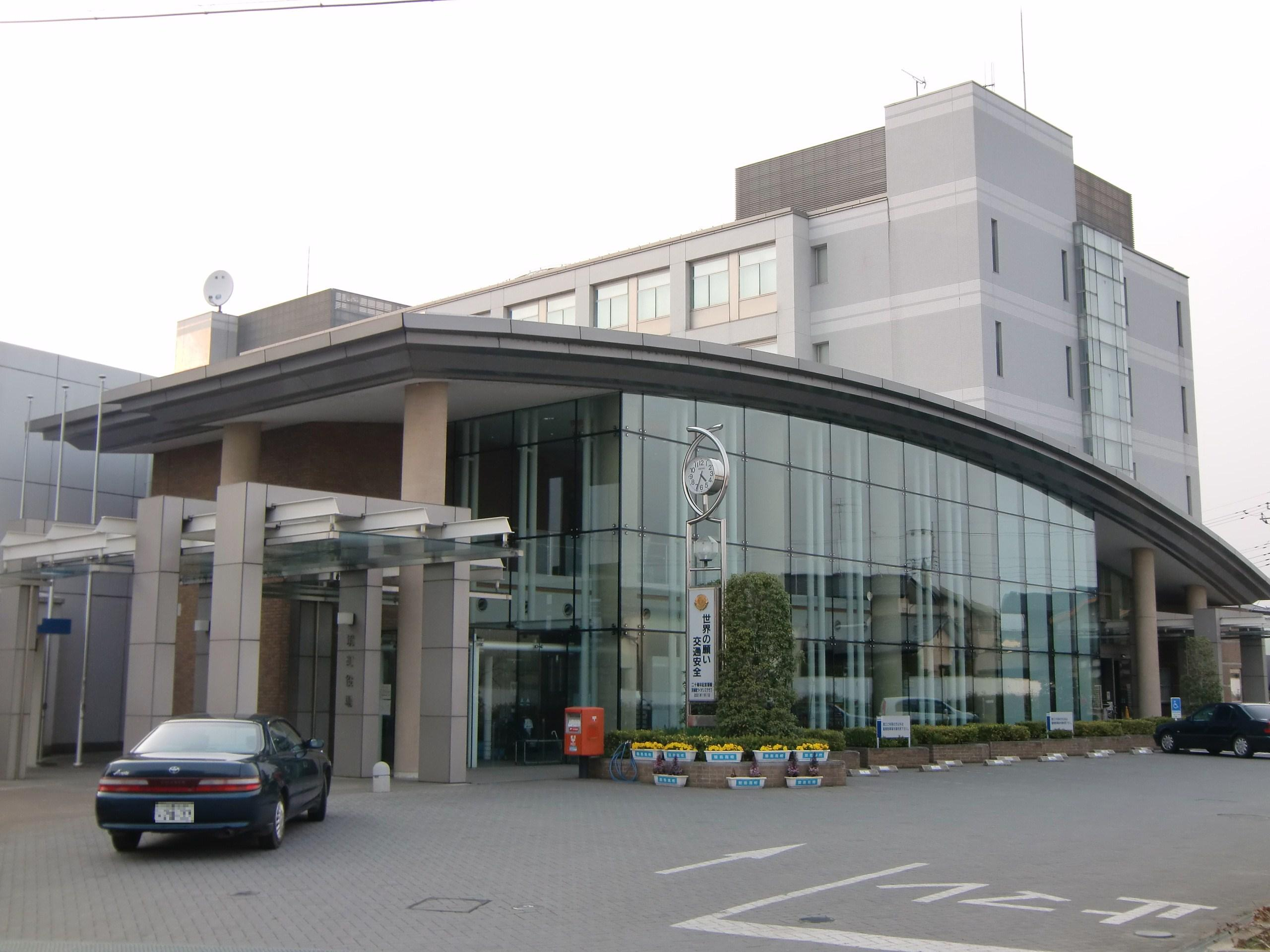
- Sakai Town Hall

- Flag Seal

- Location of Sakai in Ibaraki Prefecture

- Coordinates: 36°06′30.5″N 139°47′41.8″E
- Country: Japan
- Region: Kantō
- Prefecture: Ibaraki
- District: Sashima

Area
  - Total: 46.59 km^{2} (17.99 sq mi)

Population (October 2020)
  - Total: 24,061
  - Density: 516.4/km^{2} (1,338/sq mi)
- Time zone: UTC+9 (Japan Standard Time)
- Tree: Osmanthus fragrans
- Flower: Canna
- Phone number: 0280-81-1300
- Address: 391-1 Sakai-machi, Sashima-gun, Ibaraki-ken 306-0495
- Website: Official website

Sakai (境町, Sakai-machi; Japanese pronunciation: [saꜜ.kai] (Note: The placename is pronounced like this. The common noun meaning "border" is pronounced [sa.kaꜜi].)) is a town located in Ibaraki Prefecture, Japan. As of 1 October 2020, the town had an estimated population of 24,061 in 8890 households and a population density of 516 persons per km^{2}. The percentage of the population aged over 65 was 29.1%. The total area of the town is 46.59 square kilometres (17.99 sq mi).

== Geography ==
Sakai is located in the flatlands in the very western portion of Ibaraki Prefecture, bordered by Chiba Prefecture to the west. The Tone River runs east to west at the southern end of the town, which is located about 50 to 60 kilometers from central Tokyo.

=== Neighboring municipalities ===
Chiba Prefecture

- Noda, Chiba

Ibaraki Prefecture

- Bandō, Ibaraki
- Goka, Ibaraki
- Koga, Ibaraki

=== Climate ===
Sakai has a Humid continental climate (Köppen Cfa) characterized by warm summers and cool winters with light snowfall. The average annual temperature in Sakai is 14.4 °C. The average annual rainfall is 1321 mm with September as the wettest month. The temperatures are highest on average in August, at around 26.5 °C, and lowest in January, at around 3.3 °C.

== Demographics ==
Per Japanese census data, the population of Sakai has remained relatively steady over the past 70 years.

Historical population
Year	Pop.	±%
1920	17,273	—
1930	18,522	+7.2%
1940	19,655	+6.1%
1950	24,333	+23.8%
1960	22,587	−7.2%
1970	21,773	−3.6%
1980	25,696	+18.0%
1990	26,922	+4.8%
2000	27,171	+0.9%
2010	25,714	−5.4%
2020	24,201	−5.9%

== History ==
In the Edo period, the village of Sakai was part of the jōkamachi of Sekiyado Domain on the opposite bank of the Tone River, and was a port for river traffic to and from Edo. The area was part of Shimōsa Province and was transferred to Ibaraki Prefecture in 1875 after the start of the Meiji period. The town of Sakai was proclaimed with the establishment of the modern municipalities system on April 1, 1889.

== Government ==
Sakai has a mayor-council form of government with a directly elected mayor and a unicameral town council of 12 members. Sakai, together with neighboring Bandō and Goka, contributes two members to the Ibaraki Prefectural Assembly. In terms of national politics, the town is part of Ibaraki 7th district of the lower house of the Diet of Japan.

== Economy ==
The economy of Sakai in primarily agricultural, with rice, lettuce and cabbage as the main cash crops. The town has three industrial parks.

== Education ==
Sakai has five public elementary schools and two public middle schools operated by the town government, and one public high school operated by the Ibaraki Prefectural Board of Education.

== Transportation ==
=== Railway ===
The town does not have any passenger railway service.

=== Highway ===
- Ken-Ō Expressway – Sakai-Koga Interchange
- National Route 354

== Noted people from Sakai ==
- Kishirō Nakamura, politician
- Hiroshi Tomihari, printmaker

== Sister cities ==
- Marikina, Metro Manila, Philippines, since 2017
- Honolulu, Hawaii, United States, since 2021
- Boryeong, South Chungcheong Province, South Korea, since 2026
