= Soichiro Ito (politician) =

Japanese politician

- 伊藤 宗一郎
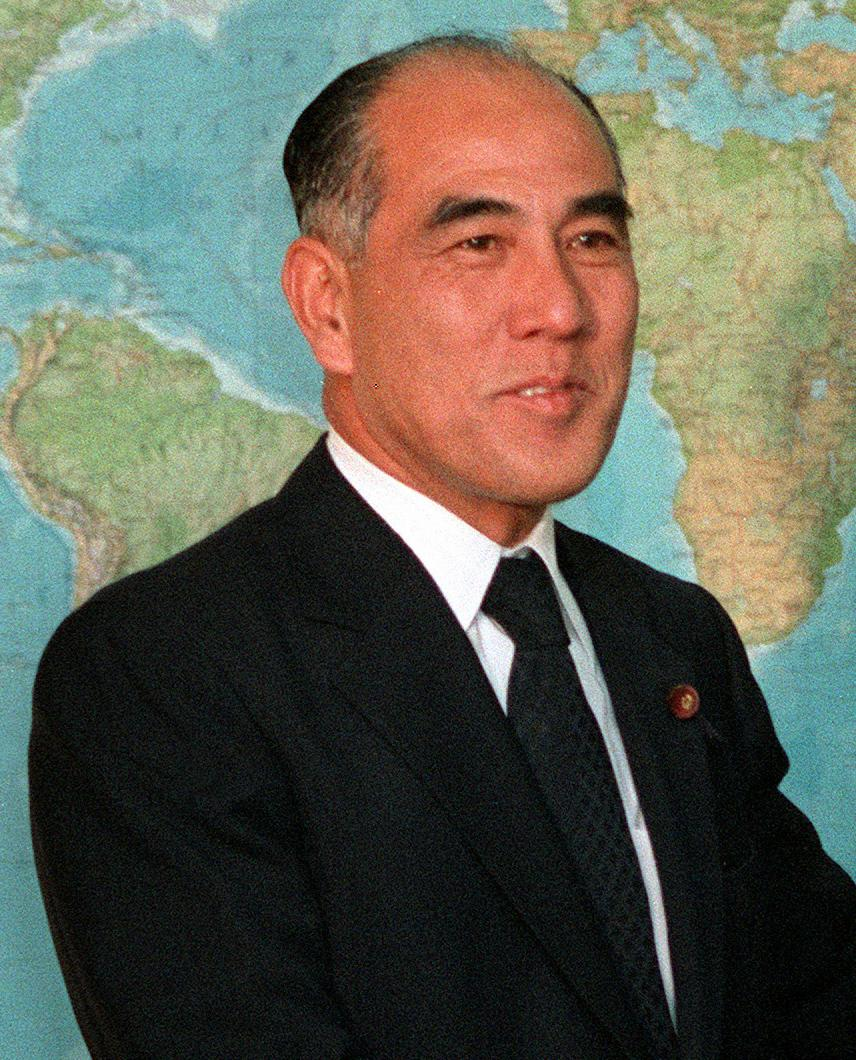
- Ito in 1982

Speaker of the House of Representatives
- In office 7 November 1996 – 2 June 2000
- Monarch: Akihito
- Deputy: Kōzō Watanabe
- Preceded by: Takako Doi
- Succeeded by: Tamisuke Watanuki

Director-General of the Science and Technology Agency
- In office 6 November 1987 – 27 December 1988
- Prime Minister: Noboru Takeshita
- Preceded by: Yatarō Mitsubayashi
- Succeeded by: Moichi Miyazaki

Director-General of the Japan Defense Agency
- In office 30 November 1981 – 27 November 1982
- Prime Minister: Zenkō Suzuki
- Preceded by: Koji Omura
- Succeeded by: Kazuho Tanigawa

Member of the House of Representatives
- In office 29 January 1967 – 4 September 2001
- Preceded by: Gentaro Takeya
- Succeeded by: Shintaro Ito
- Constituency: Miyagi 1st (1967–1996); Miyagi 4th (1996–2001)
- In office 21 November 1960 – 23 October 1963
- Preceded by: Gentaro Takeya
- Succeeded by: Gentaro Takeya
- Constituency: Miyagi 1st

Personal details
- Born: 21 March 1924 Ōsaki, Miyagi, Japan
- Died: 4 September 2001 (aged 77) Minato, Tokyo, Japan
- Party: Liberal Democratic
- Children: Shintaro Ito
- Education: Tohoku University

Military service
- Allegiance: Empire of Japan
- Branch/service: Imperial Japanese Army
- Years of service: 1940s
- Rank: Second Lieutenant

Soichiro Ito (伊藤宗一郎, Itō Sōichirō; 21 March 1924 – 4 September 2001) was a Japanese politician who served in the House of Representatives from 1967 until his death in 2001. From 1981 to 1982, Ito was the Director General of the Japan Defense Agency.

Born in Miyagi Prefecture in 1924, he studied law at Tohoku University and served briefly as a second lieutenant in the Imperial Japanese Army.
