= Furukawa =

Furukawa (古川 or 古河, both meaning "old river") may refer to:

== People ==
- Furukawa (surname)

== Places ==
- Furukawa, Gifu, a former town merged into the city of Hida, Gifu
- Furukawa, Miyagi, city located in Miyagi, Japan
- Furukawa Station, JR East railway station located in Ōsaki, Miyagi Prefecture, Japan
- Hida-Furukawa Station, JR Central railway station located in Hida, Gifu Prefecture, Japan
- Nishi-Furukawa Station, JR East railway station located in Ōsaki, Miyagi Prefecture, Japan

== Business ==
- Furukawa Co.
- Furukawa Electric, a Japanese electric and electronics equipment company

== Other ==
- JEF United Ichihara Chiba, JR East and Furukawa Electric United
