= Shintaro Ito =

Japanese politician (born 1953)

- 伊藤 信太郎
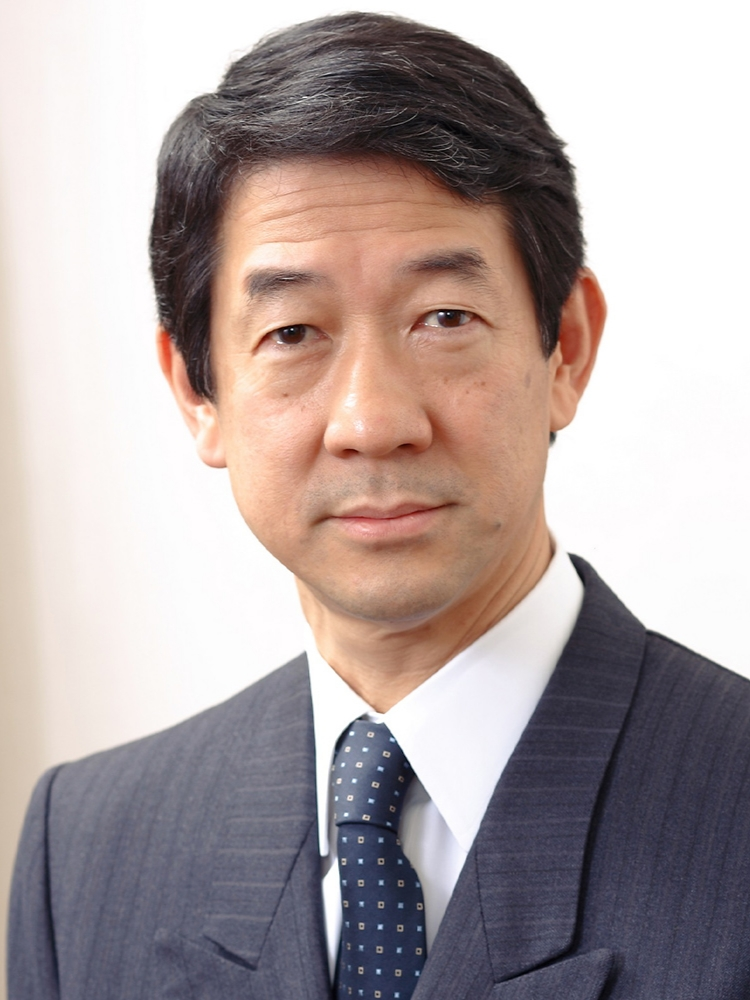
- Official portrait, 2023

Minister of the Environment
- In office 13 September 2023 – 1 October 2024
- Prime Minister: Fumio Kishida
- Preceded by: Akihiro Nishimura
- Succeeded by: Keiichiro Asao

Member of the House of Representatives
- Incumbent
- Assumed office 9 February 2026
- Constituency: Tohoku PR
- In office 19 December 2012 – 9 October 2024
- Preceded by: Keiki Ishiyama
- Succeeded by: Jun Azumi
- Constituency: Miyagi 4th
- In office 19 October 2001 – 21 July 2009
- Preceded by: Soichiro Ito
- Succeeded by: Keiki Ishiyama
- Constituency: Miyagi 4th

Personal details
- Born: 6 May 1953 (age 73) Tokyo, Japan
- Party: Liberal Democratic (Shikōkai)
- Parent: Soichiro Ito (father)
- Education: Keio University; Harvard University

Shintaro Ito (伊藤 信太郎, Itō Shintarō; born 6 May 1953) is a Japanese politician of the Liberal Democratic Party, a member of the House of Representatives in the Diet (national legislature).

== Early life ==
Ito is a native of Tokyo and graduate of Keio University. He received master's degrees from Keio University and Harvard University and completed a program at the American Film Institute.

In 1988, Ito directed development for a political video game, America Daitōryō Senkyo.

== Political career ==
Ito was elected to the House of Representatives for the first time in 2001. He served as Minister of the Environment and as Minister in the Cabinet Office for Special Tasks (Nuclear Disaster Prevention) in the second reshuffled Cabinet of Prime Minister Kishida until the dissolution of the Cabinet on October 1, 2024.

Political offices
Preceded by Akihiro Nishimura	Minister of the Environment; 2023–2024	Succeeded by Keiichiro Asao
