= Isshu Sugawara =

Japanese politician

- 菅原 一秀
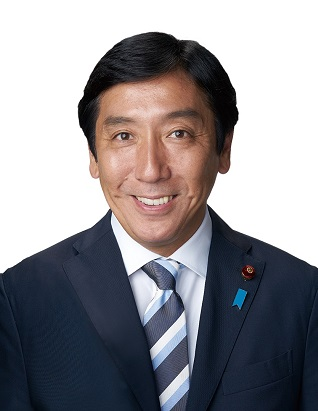
- Official portrait, 2019

Minister of Economy, Trade and Industry
- In office 11 September 2019 – 25 October 2019
- Prime Minister: Shinzo Abe
- Preceded by: Hiroshige Sekō
- Succeeded by: Hiroshi Kajiyama

Member of the House of Representatives
- Incumbent
- Assumed office 8 February 2026
- Preceded by: Issei Yamagishi
- Constituency: Tokyo 9th
- In office 9 November 2003 – 3 June 2021
- Preceded by: Kōichi Yoshida
- Succeeded by: Issei Yamagishi
- Constituency: Tokyo 9th (2003–2009); Tokyo PR (2009–2012); Tokyo 9th (2012–2021)

Member of the Tokyo Metropolitan Assembly
- In office 23 July 1997 – 2000
- Constituency: Nerima Ward

Member of the Nerima Ward Assembly
- In office 30 May 1991 – 1997

Personal details
- Born: 7 January 1962 (age 64) Nerima, Tokyo, Japan
- Party: Liberal Democratic
- Education: Waseda University

Isshu Sugawara (菅原 一秀, Sugawara Isshū; born 7 January 1962) is a Japanese politician of the Liberal Democratic Party, a member of the House of Representatives in the Diet (national legislature).

== Career ==
Sugawara is a native of Nerima, Tokyo, and a graduate of Waseda University. After an unsuccessful contest in 1990, he was elected to the assembly of Nerima, Tokyo, for the first time in 1991 serving for two terms. Having served in the Tokyo Metropolitan Assembly since 1997, he ran unsuccessfully for the House of Representatives in 2000. He ran again three years later and was elected for the first time in Tokyo 9th district.

=== Senior Vice Minister of Economy, Trade and Industry ===
In Sugawara’s time as Minister of Economy, Trade, and Industry, he vowed to decommission the Fukushima Daiichi nuclear power plant as part of his goal to end all nuclear power plants in Japan by 2030. Sugawara was only Minister of Economy, Trade, and Industry for a month and a half as he resigned from his position. Sugawara became involved in a gift scandal. Sugawara made illegal donations of 802,200 yen to 33 groups and 26 individuals in Tokyo District 9 from 2018-2019. Sugawara’s aide used a portion of the money to buy melons, oranges, roe, royal jelly, flowers, and signed cards as condolence money for families in his district dealing with a death. According to the prosecutors, the rest of the money was used for celebrations. Japan’s Public Offices Election Laws prohibit politicians from giving gifts or money to constitutions. Sugawara’s gift scandal first came to light when the weekly magazine Shukan Bunshun reported that Sugawara’s secretary gave 20,000 yen as condolences to the family of a deceased constituent.

After the scandal leaked, Sugawara left the Liberal Democratic Party on 2 June. This put the Liberal Democratic Party in a tricky situation, as they were already involved in similar scandals with former ministers. The day after Sugawara removed himself from the Liberal Democratic Party, he was pushed to resign from Minister of Economy Trade and Industry to allow Parliament discussions to continue. At first, the prosecutors at the Tokyo Summary Court did not indict Sugawara because he stepped down as Minister of Economy, Trade, and Industry and apologized. But this was changed as a civil inquest believed Sugawara’s actions warranted indictment. The Tokyo Summary Court made an indictment against him. Sugawara was fined 400,000 yen and was given a civil rights suspension. Under the suspension, Sugawara was not allowed to vote or run for office for three years.

His profile on the LDP website:

- Tokyo Metropolitan Assembly Member
- Parliamentary Secretary for Health, Labour and Welfare (Abe Cabinet)
- Deputy Secretary-General of LDP
- Deputy Director, Health, Labor and Welfare Division of LDP
- Director, Economy, Trade and Industry Division of LDP
- Senior Vice Minister of Economy, Trade and Industry

== Positions ==
Affiliated to the openly revisionist and monarchist lobby Nippon Kaigi, Sugawara supports the amendment of the Constitution of Japan, and a revision of the Constitution to allow the right of collective self-defense. He is opposed to the project that would allow women in the Imperial family to retain their Imperial status even after marriage, and to the plan to end all nuclear power plants by the end of the 2030s.

Political offices
Preceded by Kyoko Nishikawa, Hiroshi Okada	Parliamentary Secretary for Health, Labour and Welfare; 2006–2007; Served alongside: Hirokazu Matsuno	Succeeded by Kenta Matsunami, Wataru Ito
Preceded by Yōsuke Kondō, Isao Matsumiya	Senior Vice Minister of Economy, Trade and Industry; 2012–2013; Served alongside: Kazuyoshi Akaba	Succeeded by Midori Matsushima, Kazuyoshi Akaba
Preceded by Nobuhide Minorikawa, Ichiro Miyashita	Senior Vice Minister of Finance; 2014–2015; Served alongside: Ichiro Miyashita	Succeeded by Manabu Sakai, Naoki Okada
Preceded by Hiroshige Sekō	Minister of Economy, Trade and Industry; 2019	Succeeded by Hiroshi Kajiyama
