= Seiroku Kajiyama =

Japanese politician

- 梶山 静六
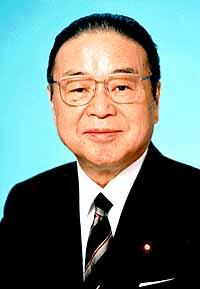
- Official portrait, 1996

Chief Cabinet Secretary
- In office 11 January 1996 – 11 September 1997
- Prime Minister: Ryutaro Hashimoto
- Preceded by: Koken Nosaka
- Succeeded by: Kanezo Muraoka

Secretary-General of the Liberal Democratic Party
- In office December 1992 – July 1993
- President: Kiichi Miyazawa
- Preceded by: Tamisuke Watanuki
- Succeeded by: Yoshirō Mori
Ministerial offices
Minister of Justice
In office 13 September 1990 – 29 December 1990
Prime Minister	Toshiki Kaifu
Preceded by	Shin Hasegawa
Succeeded by	Megumi Sato
Minister of International Trade and Industry
In office 3 June 1989 – 10 August 1989
Prime Minister	Sōsuke Uno
Preceded by	Hiroshi Mitsuzuka
Succeeded by	Hikaru Matsunaga
Minister of Home Affairs
In office 6 November 1987 – 27 December 1988
Prime Minister	Noboru Takeshita
Preceded by	Nobuyuki Hanashi
Succeeded by	Shigenobu Sakano
Chairman of the National Public Safety Commission
In office 6 November 1987 – 27 December 1988
Prime Minister	Noboru Takeshita
Preceded by	Nobuyuki Hanashi
Succeeded by	Shigenobu Sakano
Deputy Chief Cabinet Secretary (Political affairs)
In office 15 November 1974 – 9 December 1974
Prime Minister	Kakuei Tanaka
Preceded by	Jōji Ōmura
Succeeded by	Toshiki Kaifu

Member of the House of Representatives
- In office 8 October 1979 – 2 June 2000
- Preceded by: Multi-member district
- Succeeded by: Hiroshi Kajiyama
- Constituency: Ibaraki 2nd (1979–1996); Ibaraki 4th (1996–2000)
- In office 27 December 1969 – 9 December 1976
- Constituency: Ibaraki 2nd

Speaker of the Ibaraki Prefectural Assembly
- In office 1 February 1967 – 3 July 1969

Member of the Ibaraki Prefectural Assembly
- In office April 1958 – November 1969

Personal details
- Born: 27 March 1926 Hitachiōta, Ibaraki, Japan
- Died: 6 June 2000 (aged 74) Tsukiji, Tokyo, Japan
- Children: Hiroshi Kajiyama
- Education: Imperial Japanese Army Air Academy
- Alma mater: Nihon University

Seiroku Kajiyama (梶山 静六, Kajiyama Seiroku; March 27, 1926 – June 6, 2000) was a Japanese politician who served in the House of Representatives from 1969 to 1976 and from 1979 to 2000, as Secretary-General of the Liberal Democratic Party from 1992 to 1993, and as Chief Cabinet Secretary from 1996 to 1998.

== Early life ==
Kajiyama studied at the Imperial Japanese Army Air Academy from 1944 to 1945. After the end of World War II disbanded the Academy, he entered Nihon University, from which he graduated in 1947. He then took over his family's business in Ibaraki Prefecture for several years.

== Political career ==
After a stint in the Ibaraki Prefectural Assembly from 1955 to 1969, Kajiyama was elected to the House of Representatives in the 1969 general election, the first of nine electoral victories.

Kajiyama generated controversy in 1990 when, after an arrest of prostitutes in Shinjuku, in which he was involved in a racist incident by calling blacks "Prostitutes" when talking about the Shinjuku neighborhood saying that, "Here it happens like in the neighborhoods of United States, that the arrival of the blacks forces the whites to leave.” This again generated protests and caused the United States Department of State to pronounce itself condemning such words and describing them as "extremely racist" and that any type of prejudice against an ethnic group is highly reprehensible and that these words were very offensive to the American people. He later apologized in the days that followed.

Kajiyama became a prominent supporter of faction leader Noboru Takeshita. He served as Minister of Home Affairs under the Takeshita cabinet from 1987 to 1989, as Minister of International Trade and Industry under the Uno cabinet from 1989 to 1990, as Minister of Justice under the Kaifu cabinet from 1990 to 1992. He then served as Secretary-General of the LDP from 1992 to 1993, resigning in the wake of the unsuccessful 1993 general election.

In a political comeback, he was appointed Chief Cabinet Secretary under Prime Minister Ryutaro Hashimoto from January 1996 to July 1998, and thereafter unsuccessfully challenged Keizō Obuchi for the presidency of the LDP. In the midst of a financial crisis, Kajiyama advocated allowing large banks to fail through a "hard landing" policy, rather than providing government support to keep them afloat. Kajiyama's supporters in his "rebellion" included Yoshihide Suga, who would later serve as Chief Cabinet Secretary under Prime Minister Shinzo Abe in the 2010s.

== Death and legacy ==
Kajiyama was involved in a traffic accident in January 2000, and retired from politics in April of that year. He later underwent treatment for clogged arteries, and died at a Tokyo hospital in June of that year. He was survived by his wife and two children. One of his sons, Hiroshi Kajiyama, took over his Diet seat and later became a Cabinet minister.
