= America Daitōryō Senkyo =

1988 video game

- Packaging for America Daitōryō Senkyo
- Developer: Axes Art Amusement
- Publisher: Hect
- Director: Shintaro Ito
- Platform: Family Computer
- Release: JP: October 28, 1988
- Genre: Government simulation
- Mode: Single-player

America Daitōryō Senkyo (Japanese: アメリカ大統領選挙, Hepburn: Amerika Daitōryō Senkyo; translated as United States Presidential Race on the manual and cartridge label and misspelled United State Presidential Race on the box) is a government simulation video game released by Hector Playing Interface for the Family Computer in 1988. It is loosely based on the 1988 election campaign for the president of the United States and features characters based on actual candidates and other politicians. The game was conceived and directed by Japanese CNN Daywatch newscaster Shintaro Ito, who would later become a politician himself.

== Gameplay ==
At the start of the game, the player has four different issues to take either a liberal, conservative, or centrist position on. The player must make wise use of his funds as he is trying to become the President of the United States of America. Being liberal offends the religious folks, being conservative offends the university students and working class voters, and being centrist (as in pleasing everybody) actually pleases nobody. The player starts in February 1988 at a convention for his political party somewhere in the Midwestern United States. and must work his way up to the final election results in November 1988 without becoming bankrupt.

In the presently unknown primary election, candidates in five states (including players) make the final selection along with the decision-making. Opinion polls and election campaigns (speeches) do benefit the player in his presidential campaign. However, the primary elections in are not implemented in all states in the same way. Some states may be processed automatically by computer (a fixed number of delegate count) while others in a more manual way. The Super Tuesday primaries are to be held on the same day in many states, ballot counting is done after the player has made simultaneous attempts in each campaign state into three regions. After that, the primary election is made (not counting district units held, subject to the provisions of the delegate count.)

The priorities of the policies that the player can make were introduced to the game as the situation was in 1988 because of the Soviet Union and the CoCom. In 1991, the dissolution of the Soviet Union would eventually lead to CoCom being disbanded in 1994. South Africa had an apartheid regime at the time and abolished in it 1991. The Panama Canal Zone was returned in 1999 to the people of Panama. However, it differs from the political situation encountered in the game. The "AIDS patient isolation" issue was showing an event of discriminatory policy of an era that had not shown wide public awareness about how the AIDS virus manages to spread from person to person.

If the player manages to win the game and become President of the United States, the official Presidential Oath is displayed in English.

== Issues ==
=== Environmental issues ===
- Development of the nation's resources
- Nuclear power generation
- Air pollution prevention method
- Civil rights movement
- Restriction of the immigrant worker
- Firearms regulations
- Isolation of AIDS

=== Defense issues ===
- Reduction of the defense budget
- Reinforcement of military power
- Strategy science arms reduction
- Prohibition of nuclear tests
- Plans to create the Star Wars program
- To support the Government of Nicaragua
- Freezing the deployment of nuclear weapons
- Mutual (Soviet-American) reduction of defense power

=== Education and social issues ===
- Revival of a Christian morality
- Obligation of service in the public school system
- Patriotic education
- Abolition of the mandatory bussing system
- Pornography regulation
- Artificial abortion ban
- Improving the environment

=== Diplomatic issues ===
- Car import restrictions
- Punishment to the apartheid regime of South Africa
- Sanctions on Iran
- CoCom regulations
- Assistance to the anti-communist nations
- Panama Canal restoration
- Relations with the People's Republic of China
- Imposing duties on imported oil

=== Issues concerning Japan ===
- Japanese car import restrictions
- Dumping sanctions of Japanese products
- Agricultural import liberalization demand
- New comprehensive trade bill
- Improving customs duties, import charges
- Prohibition of commercial whaling
- Advancement of the Japanese capital system
- Enhancing Japanese defence

== Characters ==
=== Playable candidates ===
The player can choose to be one of six candidates: three Republicans and three Democrats. Four of the candidates are based on actual politicians who ran for the 1988 U.S. presidential elections, but with slightly altered names, while two of them are fictional characters modeled after foreign (non-U.S.) politicians.

Push
A Republican candidate based on George H. W. Bush, who went on to win the actual 1988 elections. He's the current U.S. Vice President like his real-life counterpart at the time. Push is a moderate WASP from Texas who believes in free trade.
Thutcher
A fictional Republican candidate modeled after Margaret Thatcher. Nicknamed the "iron lady", she's a conservative senator from Michigan who opposes the Japanese takeover of corporate America.
Roberts
A Republican candidate based on Pat Robertson. A television evangelist who is very arch-conservative and anti-communist. He is a member of the New Light Christian faction.
Dakakis
A Democratic candidate based on Michael Dukakis. An underdog who would provide a challenge for an expert player to get to office.
Zeckson
A Democratic candidate based on Jesse Jackson. A religious politician who vows to bring back Christian values to America.
Suzuki
A fictional Democratic candidate modeled after Noboru Takeshita. The son of Japanese immigrants, he's a senator from California currently employed by the Department of Agriculture.

=== Rival candidates ===
These candidates cannot be selected, but instead appear as political rivals for the player's chosen character.

Dall
A Republican candidate based on Bob Dole.
Sanderson
A Republican candidate.
Roeder
A fictional Democratic candidate modeled after Gerhard Schröder.
Core
A Democratic candidate based on Al Gore with high approval ratings.

=== Staff ===
After choosing a candidate, the player must then choose one of the following characters to be the candidate's assistant and provide his or her expertise into the campaign.

Alan
A former agency worker who specializes in marketing research and promises to deliver a strong campaign for the player.
Virgil
A former newscaster who is always on duty.
Scott
A former State Department worker who is influential in public life.
Penelope
A TV correspondent with proficiency in five different languages.
