= Miyagi 4th district =

Constituency of the House of Representatives of Japan

- Parliamentary constituency for the Japanese House of Representatives
- Numbered map of the Miyagi Prefecture single seats
- Prefecture: Miyagi
- Proportional District: Tohoku
- Electorate: 379,938

Current constituency
- Created: 1994
- Seats: One
- Party: LDP
- Representative: Chisato Morishita
- Municipalities: Higashimatsushima, Ishinomaki, Shiogama, Tagajō, Tomiya, Kurokawa District, Miyagi District, and Oshika District.

Miyagi 4th district (宮城県第4区, Miyagi-ken dai-yonku or simply 宮城4区, Miyagi-yonku) is a single-member constituency of the House of Representatives in the national Diet of Japan located in Miyagi Prefecture.

== Areas covered ==
=== Since 2022 ===
- Higashimatsushima
- Ishinomaki
- Shiogama
- Tagajō
- Tomiya
- Kurokawa District
- Miyagi District
- Oshika District

=== 2017 - 2022 ===
- Shiogama
- Tagajō
- Tomiya
- Kami District
- Part of Kurokawa District
  - Ōhira
  - Taiwa
- Part of Miyagi District
  - Rifu
  - Shichigahama

=== 2013 - 2017 ===
- Shiogama
- Tagajō
- Kami District
- Kurokawa District
- Miyagi District

=== 1994 - 2013 ===
- Furukawa
- Shiogama
- Tagajō
- Kami District
- Kurokawa District
- Miyagi District
- Shida District

== List of representatives ==
Election	Representative	Party	Notes
1996	Soichiro Ito	LDP	
2000	Soichiro Ito	LDP	
2001 by-el	Shintaro Ito	LDP	
2003	Shintaro Ito	LDP	
2005	Shintaro Ito	LDP	
2009	Keiki Ishiyama	Democratic	
2012	Shintaro Ito	LDP	
2014	Shintaro Ito	LDP	
2017	Shintaro Ito	LDP	
2021	Shintaro Ito	LDP	
2024	Jun Azumi	CDP	
2024	Jun Azumi	CRA	
2026	Chisato Morishita	LDP	

== Election results ==
=== 2026 ===
2026
Party	Candidate	Votes	%	±%
LDP	Chisato Morishita	124,250	57.15	
Centrist Reform	Jun Azumi	78,671	36.18	
Sanseitō	Makoto Sano	14,494	6.67	New
Majority		45,579	20.97	
Registered electors		378,328		
Turnout			58.31	▲5.94
LDP gain from Centrist Reform				

=== 2024 ===
2024
Party	Candidate	Votes	%	±%
CDP	Jun Azumi	102,229	52.07	
LDP	Shintaro Ito	65,616	33.42	
Ishin	Yūichi Sato	15,581	7.94	
Reiwa	Masahide Ōbayashi	12,913	6.58	New
Majority		36,613	18.65	
Registered electors		381,842		
Turnout			52.37	▼4.78
CDP gain from LDP				

=== 2021 ===
2021
Party	Candidate	Votes	%	±%
LDP	Shintaro Ito	74,721	56.51	
JCP	Yumi Funayama	30,047	22.73	
Ishin	Atsushi Hayasaka (Won PR seat)	27,451	20.76	New
Majority		44,674	33.78	
Registered electors		237,478		
Turnout			57.15	▲3.09
LDP hold				

=== 2017 ===
2017
Party	Candidate	Votes	%	±%
LDP	Shintaro Ito	73,298	58.45	
Kibō no Tō	Takehiko Bando	34,424	27.45	New
JCP	Naoya Takamura	17,688	14.10	
Majority		38,874	31.00	
Registered electors		239,981		
Turnout			54.06	▲4.96
LDP hold				

=== 2014 ===
2014
Party	Candidate	Votes	%	±%
LDP	Shintaro Ito	68,773	57.28	
Democratic	Masae Ido	35,242	29.35	
JCP	Hiroshi Kodaka	16,041	13.36	
Majority		33,531	27.93	
Registered electors		253,742		
Turnout			49.10	▼6.57
LDP hold				

=== 2012 ===
2012
Party	Candidate	Votes	%	±%
LDP	Shintaro Ito	80,250	44.28	
Democratic	Keiki Ishiyama	54,253	29.94	
Restoration	Masaki Hatakeyama	30,722	16.95	New
JCP	Hisashi Totsukawa	13,492	7.44	
Happiness Realization	Yoshiaki Murakami	2,518	1.39	
Majority		25,997	14.34	
Registered electors		335,608		
Turnout			55.67	▼13.73
LDP gain from Democratic				

=== 2009 ===
2009
Party	Candidate	Votes	%	±%
Democratic	Keiki Ishiyama	119,926	52.87	
LDP	Shintaro Ito	92,610	40.83	
JCP	Mikio Katō	11,881	5.24	
Happiness Realization	Yoshiaki Murakami	2,424	1.07	New
Majority		27,316	12.04	
Registered electors		332,136		
Turnout			69.40	▲4.27
Democratic gain from LDP				

=== 2005 ===
2005
Party	Candidate	Votes	%	±%
LDP	Shintaro Ito	114,245	54.54	
Democratic	Keiki Ishiyama	78,627	37.54	
JCP	Takuya Takahashi	16,584	7.92	
Majority		35,618	17.00	
Registered electors		327,552		
Turnout			65.13	▲4.76
LDP hold				

=== 2003 ===
2003
Party	Candidate	Votes	%	±%
LDP	Shintaro Ito	76,554	40.18	
Independent	Shuntaro Honma	61,200	32.12	N/A
Democratic	Takashi Yamajo	40,583	21.30	
JCP	Toshiro Ono	12,196	6.40	
Majority		15,354	8.06	
Registered electors		322,688		
Turnout			60.37	
LDP hold				

=== 2001 by-election ===
2001 Miyagi 4th district by-election
Party	Candidate	Votes	%	±%
LDP	Shintaro Ito	63,745	47.72	
Independent	Shuntaro Honma	48,871	36.59	New
Democratic	Takashi Yamajo	11,683	8.75	
JCP	Toshiro Ono	9,281	6.95	
Majority		14,874	11.13	
Registered electors				
Turnout				
LDP hold				

=== 2000 ===
2000
Party	Candidate	Votes	%	±%
LDP	Soichiro Ito	104,711	57.48	
Democratic	Yukino Sakunami	49,973	27.43	New
JCP	Michiko Sato	27,478	15.08	
Majority		54,738	30.05	
Registered electors				
Turnout				
LDP hold				

=== 1996 ===
1996
Party	Candidate	Votes	%	±%
LDP	Soichiro Ito	75,196	44.67	New
New Frontier	Kazuhiro Nitta	59,436	35.31	New
JCP	Kunio Sugawara	18,813	11.18	New
Social Democratic	Yoshihiro Sato	14,887	8.84	New
Majority		15,760	9.36	
Registered electors				
Turnout				
LDP win (new seat)				
