= Tokyo 9th district =

Japanese House of Representatives constituency

Tokyo 9th District
- Parliamentary constituency for the Japanese House of Representatives
- Numbered map of inner Tokyo single-member districts
- Prefecture: Tokyo
- Proportional District: Tokyo

Current constituency
- Created: 1994
- Seats: One
- Party: LDP
- Representative: Isshū Sugawara
- Wards: Nerima

Tokyo's 9th district is a single-member constituency of the House of Representatives, the lower house of the national Diet of Japan. It covers the western half of Nerima ward in North Tokyo.

The district was won by the Constitutional Democratic Party in the 2021 Japanese general election. The previous incumbent, former economy minister Isshu Sugawara, resigned in 2021 after being found guilty of breaking election law. Sugawara was furthermore barred from running for office for 3 years.

== List of representatives ==
Election	Representative	Party	Notes
1996	Kōichi Yoshida	New Frontier	
1996	Kōichi Yoshida	Sun	
1996	Kōichi Yoshida	Good Governance	
2000	Kōichi Yoshida	Democratic	
2003	Isshu Sugawara	Liberal Democratic	
2005	Isshu Sugawara	Liberal Democratic	
2009	Takatane Kiuchi	Democratic	
2009	Takatane Kiuchi	Independent	
2009	Takatane Kiuchi	People's Life First	
2009	Takatane Kiuchi	Tomorrow	
2012	Isshu Sugawara	Liberal Democratic	
2014	Isshu Sugawara	Liberal Democratic	
2017	Isshu Sugawara	Liberal Democratic	
2017	Isshu Sugawara	Independent	
Vacant (June 2021 - October 2021)
2021	Issei Yamagishi	CDP	
2024	Issei Yamagishi	CDP	
2026	Isshu Sugawara	Liberal Democratic	

== Election results ==
2026
Party	Candidate	Votes	%	±%
LDP	Isshū Sugawara	78,927	43.0	▲5.1
Centrist Reform	Issei Yamagishi	56,175	30.6	▼13.5
DPP	Michiyo Yakushiji	32,670	17.8	
Sanseitō	Fumiya Suzuki	15,638	8.5	
Turnout			61.03	▲3.10
LDP gain from Centrist Reform				

2024
Party	Candidate	Votes	%	±%
CDP	Issei Yamagishi	75,474	44.1	▲3.2
Independent (endorsed by Komeito and LDP)	Isshu Sugawara	64,798	37.9	
Innovation	Shigeta Ookōchi	23,488	13,7	▼4.2
The Collaborative Party	Ayaka Otsu	7,245	4.2	
Registered electors		307,404		
Turnout			57.93	▲0.22
CDP hold				

2021
Party	Candidate	Votes	%	±%
CDP (endorsed by SDP)	Issei Yamagishi	109,489	40.90	New
Liberal Democratic (endorsed by Komeito)	Takao Ando (PR seat incumbent)	95,284	35.59	
Innovation	Jun Minami	47,842	17.87	New
Yamato Party	Kōki Kobayashi	15,091	5.64	New
Majority		14,205	5.31	
Registered electors		478,743		
Turnout			57.71	▲3.03
CDP gain from Independent				

2017
Party	Candidate	Votes	%	±%
Liberal Democratic (endorsed by Komeito)	Isshu Sugawara (incumbent)	122,279	49.17	
Kibō no Tō	Satoshi Takamatsu	64,731	26.03	New
Communist	Junko Hara	57,439	23.10	
Independent	Yoshinari Maeda	4,243	1.71	New
Majority		57,548	23.14	
Registered electors		468,623		
Turnout			54.68	▼0.11
LDP hold				

2014
Party	Candidate	Votes	%	±%
Liberal Democratic (endorsed by Komeito)	Isshu Sugawara (incumbent)	123,368	51.40	
Innovation (endorsed by DPJ, PLP)	Takatane Kiuchi (won PR seat)	65,809	27.42	New
Communist	Junko Hara	50,861	21.19	
Majority		57,559	23.98	
Registered electors		452,092		
Turnout			54.79	▼8.67
LDP hold				

2012
Party	Candidate	Votes	%	±%
Liberal Democratic (endorsed by Komeito)	Isshu Sugawara (PR seat incumbent)	145,013	53.49	
Tomorrow (endorsed by Daichi)	Takatane Kiuchi (incumbent)	55,736	20.56	New
Democratic (endorsed by PNP)	Takashi Fukumura	45,386	16.74	
Communist	Masayuki Sakajiri	24,976	9.21	
Majority		89,277	32.93	
Registered electors		448,660		
Turnout			63.46	▼4.42
LDP gain from Tomorrow				

2009
Party	Candidate	Votes	%	±%
Democratic (endorsed by PNP)	Takatane Kiuchi	140,109	47.24	
Liberal Democratic (endorsed by Komeito)	Isshu Sugawara (incumbent) (won PR seat)	126,026	42.49	
Communist	Yoshinobu Kishi	26,796	9.04	
Happiness Realization	Tadahiro Okihara	3,644	1.23	New
Majority		14,083	4.75	
Registered electors		444,929		
Turnout			67.88	▲0.40
Democratic gain from LDP				

2005
Party	Candidate	Votes	%	±%
Liberal Democratic	Isshu Sugawara (incumbent)	153,309	53.86	
Democratic	Tomotaro Kawashima	87,890	30.88	
Communist	Yasuko Mochizuki	28,493	10.01	
Social Democratic	Naoto Nakagawa	14,952	5.25	
Majority		65,419	22.98	
Registered electors		429,691		
Turnout			67.48	▲7.78
LDP hold				

2003
Party	Candidate	Votes	%	±%
Liberal Democratic	Isshu Sugawara	112,868	45.83	
Democratic	Kōichi Yoshida (incumbent)	96,662	39.25	
Communist	Yasuko Mochizuki	27,903	11.33	
Social Democratic	Satoshi Murata	8,841	3.59	N/A
Majority		16,206	6.58	
Registered electors		423,412		
Turnout			59.73	▼1.68
LDP gain from Democratic				

2000
Party	Candidate	Votes	%	±%
Democratic	Kōichi Yoshida (incumbent)	86,450	35.43	New
Liberal Democratic	Isshu Sugawara	81,912	33.57	
Communist	Yasuko Mochizuki	44,057	18.05	
Liberal	Tomotaro Kawashima	31,612	12.95	New
Majority		4,538	1.86	
Registered electors		409,647		
Turnout			61.41	▲3.94
Democratic hold				

1996
Party	Candidate	Votes	%	±%
New Frontier	Kōichi Yoshida	67,657	30.74	New
Democratic	Toshio Ogawa	59,668	27.11	New
Liberal Democratic	Guts Ishimatsu	43,766	19.89	New
Communist	Kotaro Masumura	37,172	16.89	New
Social Democratic	Tomoo Bando	11,808	5.37	New
Majority		7,989	3.63	
Turnout			57.47	
New Frontier win (new seat)				
