= Hiroshi Kajiyama (politician) =

Japanese politician

- 梶山 弘志
- Official portrait, 2019

Minister of Economy, Trade and Industry
- In office 25 October 2019 – 4 October 2021
- Prime Minister: Shinzo Abe; Yoshihide Suga
- Preceded by: Isshu Sugawara
- Succeeded by: Kōichi Hagiuda

Minister of State for Regulatory Reform
- In office 3 August 2017 – 2 October 2018
- Prime Minister: Shinzo Abe
- Preceded by: Kozo Yamamoto
- Succeeded by: Satsuki Katayama

Member of the House of Representatives
- Incumbent
- Assumed office 25 June 2000
- Preceded by: Seiroku Kajiyama
- Constituency: Ibaraki 4th

Personal details
- Born: 18 October 1955 (age 71) Hitachiōta, Ibaraki, Japan
- Party: Liberal Democratic
- Parent: Seiroku Kajiyama (father)
- Education: Nihon University

Hiroshi Kajiyama (梶山 弘志, Kajiyama Hiroshi; born 18 October 1955) is a Japanese politician who served as Minister of Economy, Trade and Industry from October 2019 to October 2021. He is a member of the House of Representative since 2000, representing the Ibaraki 4th district.

== Early life ==
Kajiyama was born in Hitachiōta, Ibaraki. His father, Seiroku Kajiyama, was a prefectural assemblyman who later won a seat in the House of Representatives and rose to the positions of LDP Secretary-General and several Cabinet posts. Kajiyama graduated from Nihon University and joined the Power Reactor and Nuclear Fuel Development Corporation in 1979, where he worked until 1985. After a stint as his father's secretary from 1985 to 1988, he started a non-ferrous metals trading company and served as its president.

== Political career ==
After his father's death in 2000, Kajiyama successfully ran to take over his father's seat in the 2000 general election. He thereafter won re-election six times.

In 2006, he was appointed as Parliamentary Vice-Minister of Land, Infrastructure, Transport and Tourism Administration.

Kajiyama was appointed to serve as State Minister of Land, Infrastructure, Transport and Tourism in 2012.

In August 2017, he was appointed to serve as minister in charge of administrative reforms, and announced new guidelines on the management of administrative documents. This came in the wake of the Moritomo Gakuen scandal, in which the government was accused of destroying records to cover up a favorable land-sale contract.

In October 2019, he was appointed to serve as Minister of Economy, Trade and Industry, Minister in charge of Industrial Competitiveness, Minister in charge of International Exposition, Minister for Economic Cooperation with Russia, Minister in charge of the Response to the Economic Impact caused by the Nuclear Accident, and Minister of State for the Nuclear Damage Compensation and Decommissioning Facilitation Corporation. As METI minister, he announced initiatives to phase out coal power in Japan in favor of renewable energy.

House of Representatives (Japan)
Preceded by Seiroku Kajiyama	Representative for Ibaraki 4th district 2000–present	Incumbent
Preceded by Yasushi Kaneko	Chairman of the Committee on Land, Infrastructure, Transport and Tourism; 2013–2014	Succeeded by Masahiro Imamura
Political offices
Preceded by Kozo Yamamoto	Minister of State for Regulatory Reform; 2017–2018	Succeeded by Satsuki Katayama
Preceded by Kozo Yamamoto	Minister of State for Regional Revitalisation; 2017–2018	Succeeded by Satsuki Katayama
Preceded by Isshu Sugawara	Minister of Economy, Trade and Industry; 2019–2021	Succeeded by Koichi Hagiuda
Party political offices
Preceded by Seiko Noda	Executive Deputy Secretary General, Liberal Democratic Party; 2021–2024	Succeeded by Tatsuo Fukuda
Preceded by Tetsushi Sakamoto	Chairman of the Diet Affairs Committee, Liberal Democratic Party; 2025–present	Incumbent
