= Sōwa, Ibaraki =

Dissolved municipality in Ibaraki prefecture, Japan

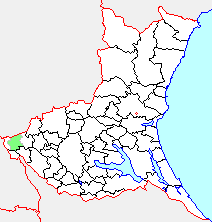
Map of Sōwa, Ibaraki

Sōwa (総和町, Sōwa-machi) was a town located in Sashima District, Ibaraki Prefecture, Japan.

As of 2003, the town had an estimated population of 48,810 and a density of 924.43 persons per km^{2}. The total area was 52.80 km^{2}.

On September 12, 2005, Sōwa, along with the town of Sanwa (also from Sashima District), was merged into the expanded city of Koga. Sōwa's town hall is used as the new Koga City Hall.
