= Ibaraki 4th district =

Japan House of Representatives constituency

Parliamentary constituencies in Ibaraki Prefecture

Ibaraki 4th district (茨城県第4区 Ibaraki-ken dai-yon-ku or 茨城4区 Ibaraki 4-ku) is a single-member constituency of the House of Representatives in the Diet of Japan. It is located in Northern Ibaraki and consists of the cities of Hitachinaka, Hitachiōta, Hitachiōmiya and Naka and the town of Daigo. As of 2021, 268,147 eligible voters were registered in the district.

Before the electoral reform of 1994, the area was part of the multi-member Ibaraki 2nd district where three Representatives had been elected by single non-transferable vote.

Ibaraki 4th district is a "conservative kingdom" (hoshu ōkoku), a stronghold of the Liberal Democratic Party (LDP). It wasn't even contested by the main opposition Democratic Party in the 2000 and 2003 general elections and withstood the Democratic landslide victory in the election of 2009. Since its creation the district has been represented by the Kajiyama family for the LDP: former Trade, Home, Justice Minister and Chief Cabinet Secretary Seiroku Kajiyama (Obuchi faction) and his son Hiroshi (no faction).

== List of representatives ==
Representative	Party	Dates	Notes
Seiroku Kajiyama	LDP	1996–2000	Died in June 2000
Hiroshi Kajiyama	LDP	2000–present	Incumbent

== Election results ==
2026
Party	Candidate	Votes	%	±%
LDP	Hiroshi Kajiyama	106,286	83.1	▲14.77
JCP	Tsubasa Yoshida	21,610	16.9	▲4.19
Registered electors		260,198		
Turnout		127,896	51.88	▼0.27
LDP hold				

2024
Party	Candidate	Votes	%	±%
LDP	Hiroshi Kajiyama	91,019	68.33	▼2.17
Restoration	Muto Hiromitsu	25,263	18.96	new
JCP	Tsubasa Yoshida	16,927	12.71	new
Registered electors		263,539		
Turnout		133,209	52.15	▼0.66
LDP hold				

2021
Party	Candidate	Votes	%	±%
LDP	Hiroshi Kajiyama	98,254	70.5	▲0.6
Ishin	Yūko Mutō	25,162	18.0	
JCP	Kumiko Ōuchi	16,018	11.5	▲2.5
Turnout			52.81	▲0.89
LDP hold				

2017
Party	Candidate	Votes	%	±%
LDP	Hiroshi Kajiyama	97,966	69.9	▲4.4
Kibō no Tō	Toshiaki Ōkuma	29,547	21.1	
JCP	Kakuji Horie	12,548	9.0	▲2.7
Turnout			51.92	▼4.00
LDP hold				

2014
Party	Candidate	Votes	%	±%
LDP	Hiroshi Kajiyama	95,655	64.5	▼0.6
Democratic	Mamoru Takano	41,507	28.0	▲0.3
JCP	Kakuji Horie	9,331	6.3	▼0.9
Independent	Takashi Kimura	1874	1.3	
Turnout			55.92	
LDP hold				

2012
Party	Candidate	Votes	%	±%
LDP	Hiroshi Kajiyama	113,718	65.1	
Democratic	Mamoru Takano	48,395	27.7	
JCP	Shūji Uno	12,555	7.2	

2009
Party	Candidate	Votes	%	±%
LDP	Hiroshi Kajiyama	104,236	50.7	
Democratic	Mamoru Takano (elected by PR)	97,256	47.3	
Happiness Realization	Nobutake Nakamura	3,968	1.9	
Turnout		210,007	69.16	

2005
Party	Candidate	Votes	%	±%
LDP	Hiroshi Kajiyama	122,200	63.2	
Democratic	Mamoru Takano	59,941	31.0	
JCP	Atsuko Kawasaki	11,212	5.8	
Turnout		198,451	65.77	

2003
Party	Candidate	Votes	%	±%
LDP	Hiroshi Kajiyama	119,047	74.1	
Social Democratic	Shūichi Ōshima	28,660	17.8	
JCP	Atsuko Kawasaki	11,212	8.1	
Turnout		165,512	55.24	

2000
Party	Candidate	Votes	%	±%
LDP	Hiroshi Kajiyama	139,817	83.4	
JCP	Kiichi Ōwada	27,927	16.6	

1996
Party	Candidate	Votes	%	±%
LDP	Seiroku Kajiyama	112,977	68.3	
New Frontier	Shūichi Ōshima	38,028	23.0	
JCP	Michinao Nemoto	14,325	8.7	
Turnout		170,802	59.58	
