= Taniyama Station =

Taniyama Station (谷山駅) is the name of two train stations in Japan:

- Taniyama Station (JR Kyushu)
- Taniyama Station (Kagoshima Municipal Tramway), a railway station in Japan
