= Yasushi Furukawa =

Yasushi Furukawa may refer to:

- Yasushi Furukawa (politician) (古川 康; born 1958), governor of Saga Prefecture in Japan
- Yasushi Furukawa (volleyball) (古川 靖志; born 1961), Japanese former volleyball player
