= Narutoshi Furukawa =

Japanese photographer

Narutoshi Furukawa (古川 成俊, Furukawa Narutoshi; 1900–1996) was a Japanese photographer. He was born in Karatsu, Saga Prefecture. His grandfather was Shumpei Furukawa, himself a photographer. Furukawa graduated from the Tokyo School of Fine Arts in 1922. In 1930, he joined the New Photography Research Society; several of his photographic montages were published in the group's journal. He retired from photography in 1955 but became a professor at the Tokyo Junior College of Photography. He was made a professor emeritus there in 1982.
