= Bandō, Ibaraki =

Bandō 坂東市
- City
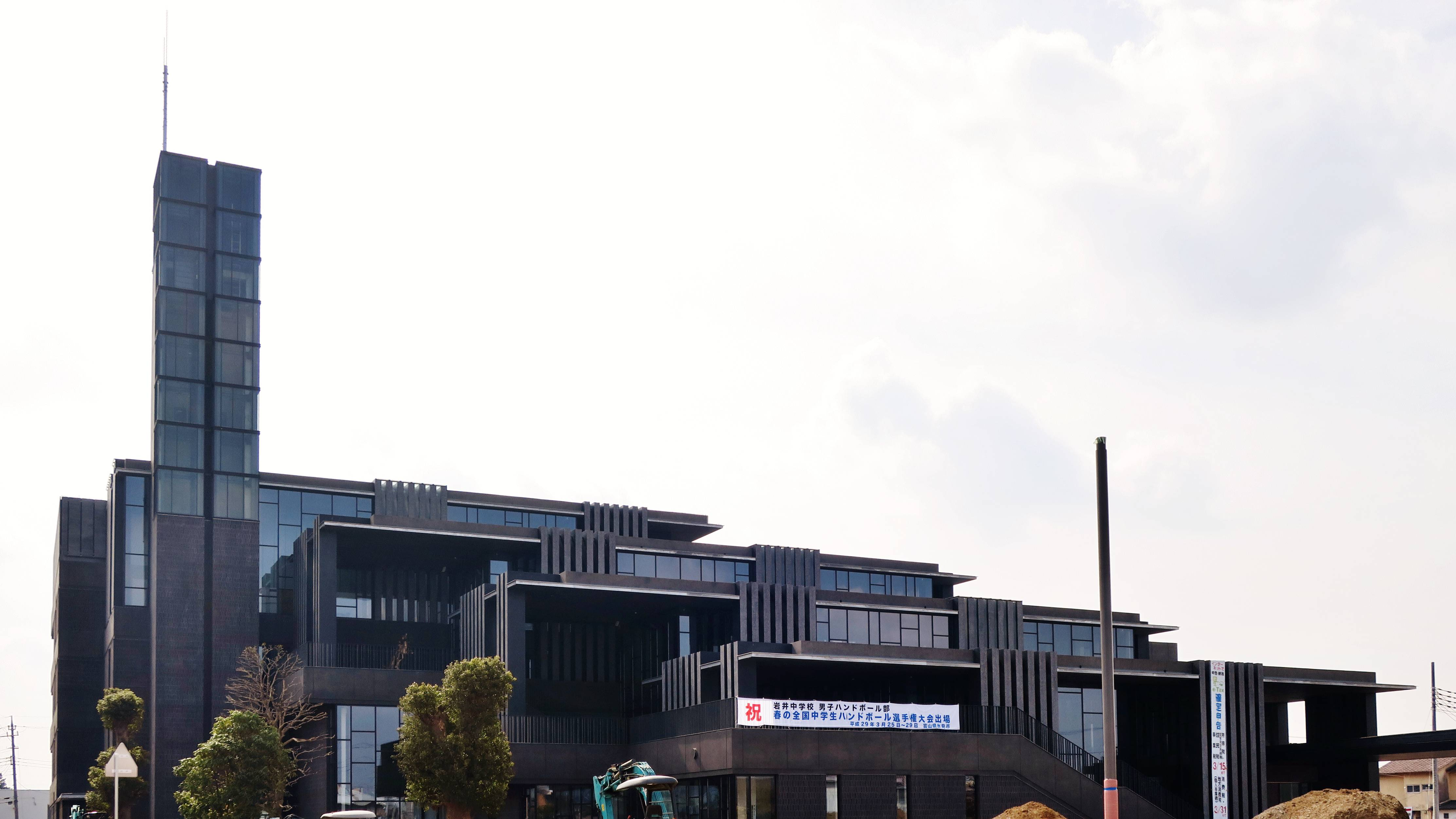
- Bandō city hall

- Flag Seal

- Interactive map of Bandō
- Coordinates: 36°2′54.3″N 139°53′19.4″E
- Country: Japan
- Region: Kantō
- Prefecture: Ibaraki

Area
  - Total: 123.03 km^{2} (47.50 sq mi)

Population (October 2020)
  - Total: 51,577
  - Density: 419.22/km^{2} (1,085.8/sq mi)
- Time zone: UTC+9 (Japan Standard Time)
- Tree: Zelkova serrata
- Flower: Tea
- Bird: Japanese bush warbler
- Phone number: 0297-35-2121
- Address: Iwai 4365, Bando City, Ibaraki Prefecture 306-0692
- Website: Official website

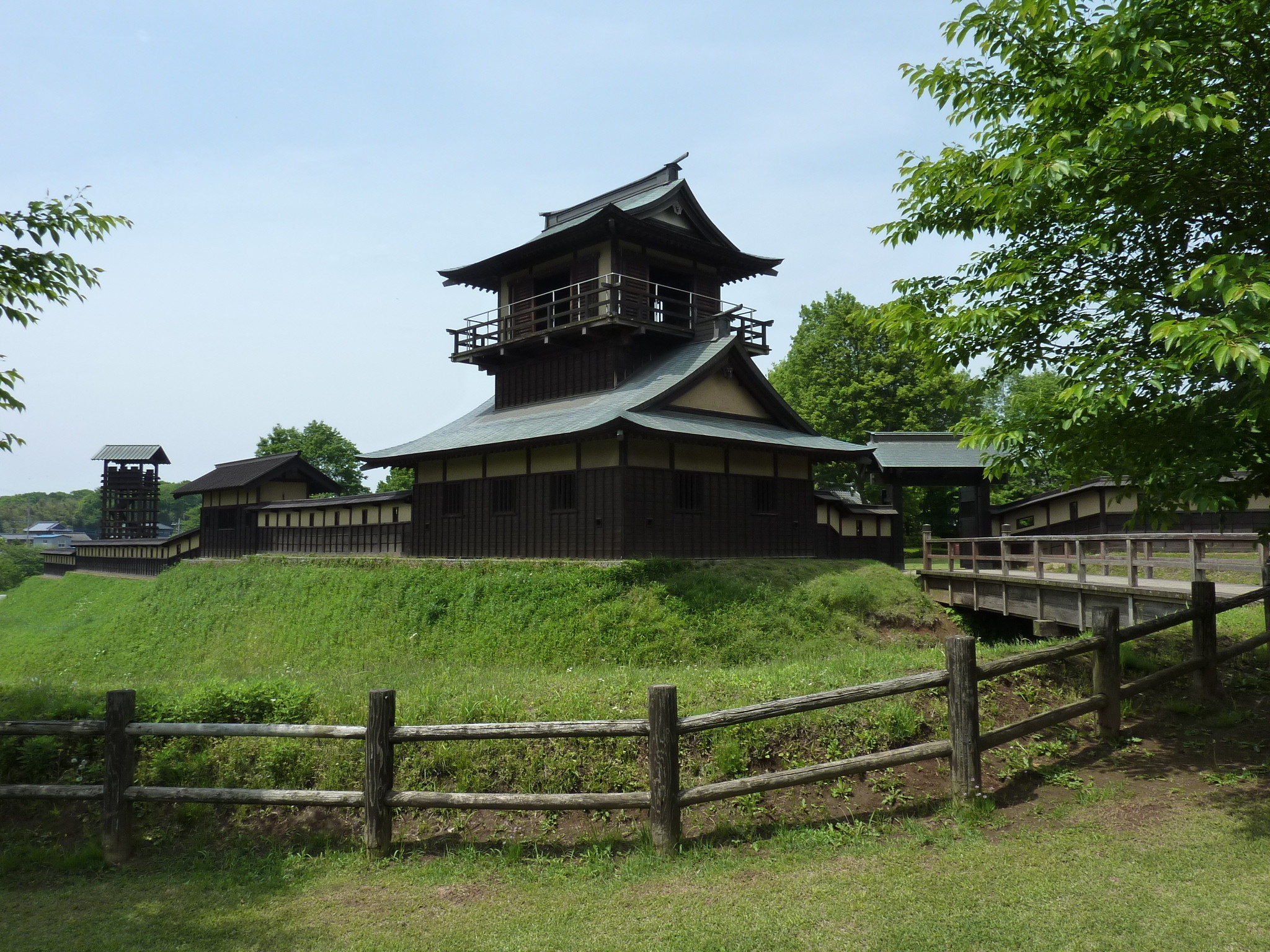
Sakasai Castle

Bandō (坂東市, Bandō-shi) is a city located in Ibaraki Prefecture, Japan. As of 1 October 2020, the city had an estimated population of 51,577 in 18,441 households and a population density of 419 persons per km^{2}. The percentage of the population aged over 65 was 30.7%. The total area of the city is 123.03 square kilometres (47.50 sq mi).

== Geography ==
Bandō is located in far southwestern Ibaraki Prefecture, on the north bank of the Tone River, bordered by Chiba Prefecture to the southwest. It is approximately 50 kilometers northeast of Tokyo.

=== Surrounding municipalities ===
Chiba Prefecture

- Noda

Ibaraki Prefecture

- Jōsō
- Koga
- Sakai
- Yachiyo

=== Climate ===
Bandō has a humid subtropical climate (Köppen Cfa) characterized by warm summers and cool winters with light snowfall. The average annual temperature in Bandō is 14.3 °C. The average annual rainfall is 1316 mm with September as the wettest month. The temperatures are highest on average in August, at around 26.4 °C, and lowest in January, at around 3.2 °C.

== Demographics ==
Per Japanese census data, the population of Bandō peaked around the year 1990 and has declined slightly since.

Historical population
Year	Pop.	±%
1920	37,015	—
1930	39,661	+7.1%
1940	42,007	+5.9%
1950	51,707	+23.1%
1960	48,176	−6.8%
1970	48,853	+1.4%
1980	55,204	+13.0%
1990	58,699	+6.3%
2000	58,673	−0.0%
2010	56,114	−4.4%
2020	52,265	−6.9%

== History ==
The area of modern Bandō was part of Shimōsa Province until the start of the Meiji period. With the establishment of the modern municipalities system on April 1, 1889, the village of Iwai was created within Sashima District, Ibaraki. Iwai was elevated to town status on July 4, 1900, and to city status on April 1, 1972. The city of Bandō was established on March 22, 2005, from the merger of the city of Iwai with the neighboring town of Sashima.

== Government ==
Bandō has a mayor-council form of government with a directly elected mayor and a unicameral city council of 20 members. Bandō contributes one member to the Ibaraki Prefectural Assembly. In terms of national politics, the city is part of Ibaraki 7th district of the lower house of the Diet of Japan.

== Economy ==
Bandō has mixed economy with a large number of industrial parks. The area is traditionally known for its production of leeks, lettuce and Chinese cabbage.

== Education ==
- Bandō has 13 public elementary schools and four public middle schools operated by the city government, and two public high schools operated by the Ibaraki Prefectural Board of Education.

== Transportation ==
=== Railway ===
- Bandō does not have any passenger train service.

=== Highway ===
- Ken-Ō Expressway – Bando Interchange
- National Route 354

== Local attractions ==
- site of Sakasai Castle
- Ibaraki Nature Museum

== International relations ==
- Pine Bluff, Arkansas, United States, sister city since October 9, 1989

== Notable people ==
- Wakanami Jun, sumo wrestler
- Makoto Takimoto, judoka
