= Sanwa, Ibaraki =

Dissolved municipality in Ibaraki prefecture, Japan

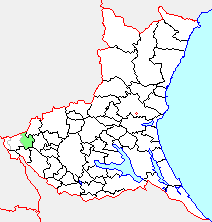
Map of Sanwa, Ibaraki

Sanwa (三和町, Sanwa-machi) was a town located in Sashima District, Ibaraki Prefecture, Japan.

As of 2003, the town had an estimated population of 39,220 and a density of 787.87 persons per km^{2}. The total area was 49.78 km^{2}.

On September 12, 2005, Sanwa, along with the town of Sōwa (also from Sashima District), was merged into the expanded city of Koga.
