= Sashima District =

District in Ibaraki prefecture, Japan

Sashima District in Ibaraki Prefecture

Sashima (猿島郡, Sashima-gun) is a district located in Ibaraki Prefecture, Japan.

As of 2020, the district had an estimated population of 32,294, with a population density of 463,3 persons per km². The total area is 69.70 km². Annual population change between 2015 and 2020 was -0.61%.

Within the district, the Edo river flows into the Tone river.

== Towns and villages ==
- Goka
- Sakai

== Mergers ==
- On March 22, 2005, the town of Sashima merged with the neighboring city of Iwai forming the city of Bandō.
- On September 12, 2005, the towns of Sanwa and Sōwa merged into the city of Koga.
