= Keiko Nagaoka =

Japanese politician (born 1953)

- 永岡 桂子
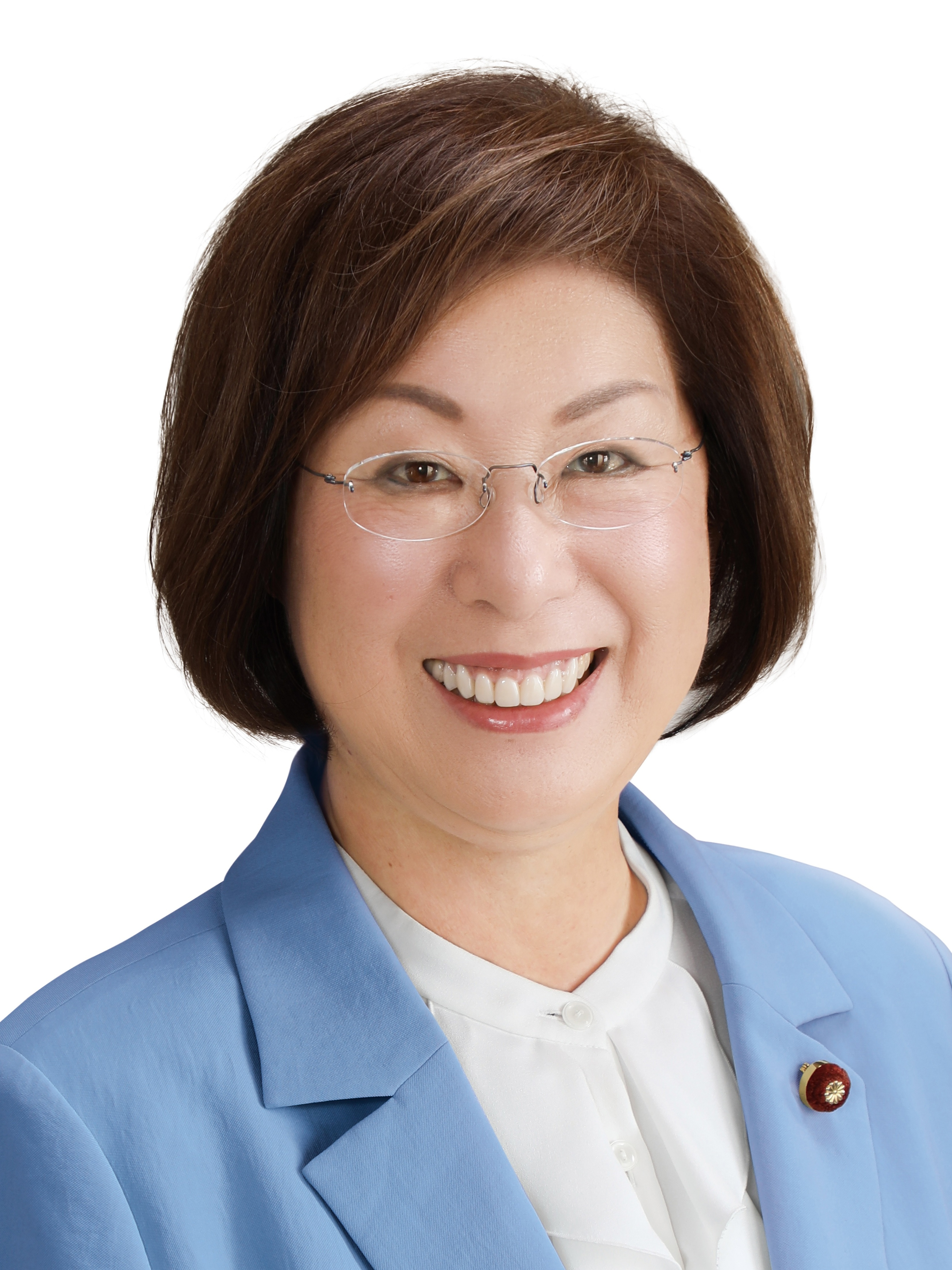
- Official portrait, 2023

Minister of Education, Culture, Sports, Science and Technology
- In office 10 August 2022 – 13 September 2023
- Prime Minister: Fumio Kishida
- Preceded by: Shinsuke Suematsu
- Succeeded by: Masahito Moriyama

Member of the House of Representatives; from Northern Kanto
- Incumbent
- Assumed office 11 September 2005
- Preceded by: Multi-member district
- Constituency: PR block (2005–2021); Ibaraki 7th (2021–2024); PR block (2024–present)

Personal details
- Born: 8 December 1953 (age 72) Shibuya, Tokyo, Japan
- Party: Liberal Democratic (Shikōkai)
- Spouse: Yoji Nagaoka (m. 1978; died 2005)
- Education: Gakushuin University

Keiko Nagaoka (永岡 桂子, Nagaoka Keiko; born 8 December 1953) is a Japanese politician serving in the House of Representatives in the Diet (national legislature) as a member of the Liberal Democratic Party. A native of Tokyo and graduate of Gakushuin University she was elected for the first time in 2005. Her husband was politician Yoji Nagaoka, who committed suicide on 1 August 2005.

== Early life ==
Born in Shibuya, her father was the president of a feed company. She attended the Gakushūin for middle school and high school. In March 1976 she graduated from the Law Faculty of Gakushuin University. In January 1978 she married Yōji Nagaoka, who at that time was a bureaucrat in the Ministry of Agriculture, Forestry and Fisheries. In 1995 her husband retired from the Ministry and entered electoral politics, joining the New Frontier Party, but did not win an election until he joined the Liberal Democratic Party (LDP) in 2003.

== Political career ==
In 2005, Nagaoka's husband cast a vote in favor the privatization of the Japanese Post Office (which later became the Japan Post Network in 2007), thereby incurring the wrath of Banking Minister Shizuka Kamei, who was the leader of his faction within the LDP. A magazine called Nagaoka a traitor for this action. On 1 August Nagaoka reported to the police that her husband had hanged himself. Although he did not leave a suicide note, stress over political matters was widely cited as the reason.

Following her husband's suicide, Nagaoka announced her candidacy for his seat (Ibaraki District 7) in the 2005 Japanese general election, with the assent of the LDP. Although defeated for the District 7 seat by Kishirō Nakamura (independent), she won a proportional seat in the Kanto block proportional seat, and became a member of the House of Representatives.

In the 2021 Japanese general election she defeated Kishirō Nakamura (previously unbeaten after 14 elections).

Political offices
Preceded by Shinsuke Suematsu	Minister of Education, Culture, Sports, Science and Technology; 2022–2023	Succeeded by Masahito Moriyama
