= Iwai, Ibaraki =

Dissolved municipality in Ibaraki prefecture, Japan

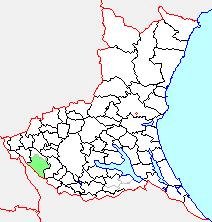
Map of Iwai, Ibaraki

Iwai (岩井市, Iwai-shi) was a city located in Ibaraki Prefecture, Japan.

As of 2003, the city had an estimated population of 42,813 and the density of 471.92 persons per km^{2}. The total area was 90.72 km^{2}.

On March 22, 2005, Iwai, along with the town of Sashima (from Sashima District), was merged to create the city of Bandō and no longer exists as an independent municipality.

The city was founded on April 1, 1972.
