= Keiko Furukawa =

Announcer for the Japanese broadcasting company MBS

- Born: Furukawa Keiko; January 30, 1967 (age 59); Japan

Keiko Furukawa (Japanese:古川 圭子, Furukawa Keiko, real name: Keiko Kamei (亀井圭子); born January 30, 1967) is an announcer for the Japanese broadcasting company MBS. She joined the company in 1993.

She is married to Mareo Kamei, who also works at MBS and is two years her senior.
