= Koga, Ibaraki =

Koga 古河市
- City
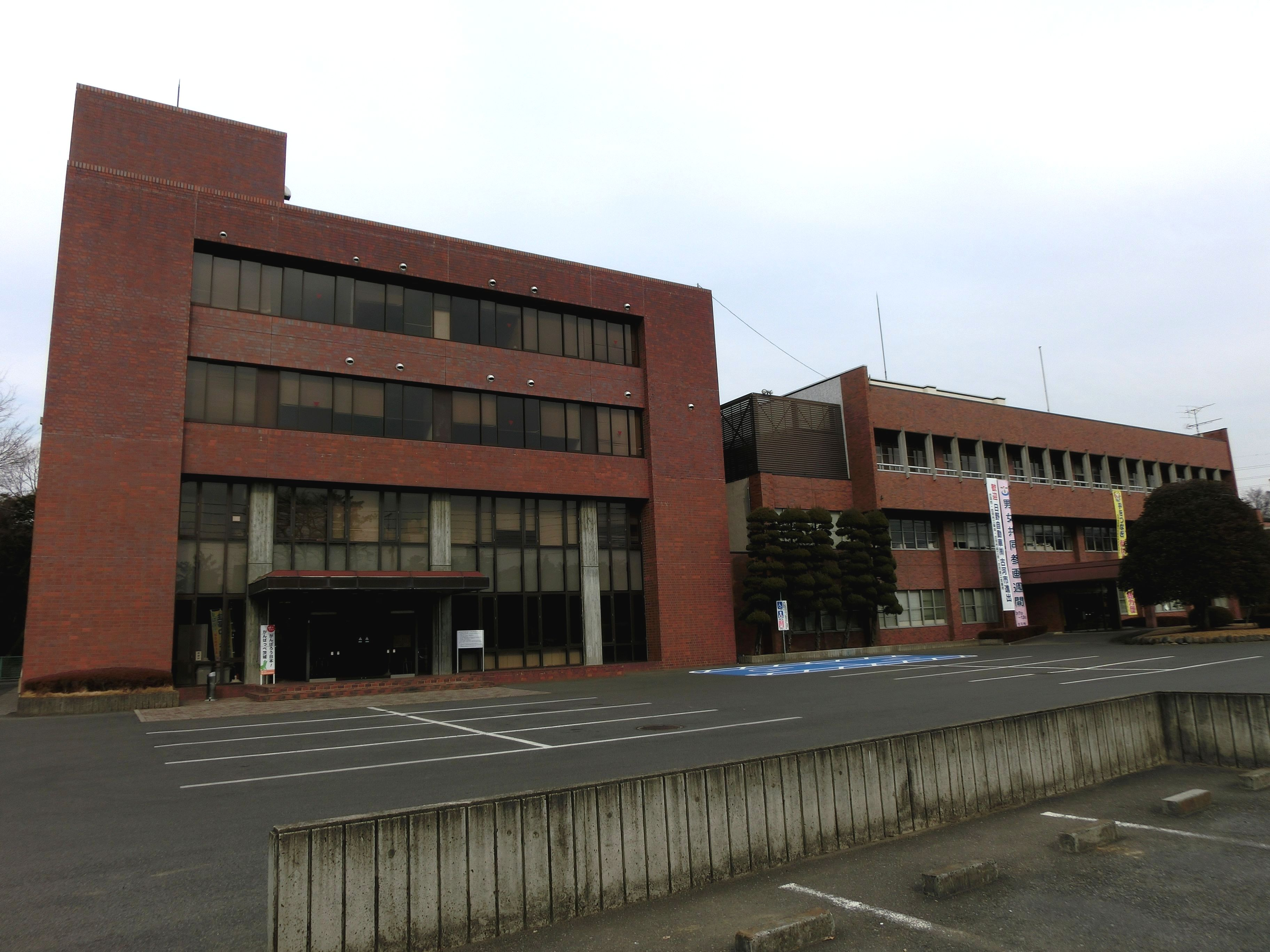
- Koga city hall

- Flag Seal

- Location of Koga in Ibaraki Prefecture

- Coordinates: 36°10′41.7″N 139°45′19.6″E
- Country: Japan
- Region: Kantō
- Prefecture: Ibaraki

Government
  - Mayor: Chikara Hariya (since December 2016)

Area
  - Total: 123.58 km^{2} (47.71 sq mi)

Population (January 2024)
  - Total: 137,512
  - Density: 1,112.7/km^{2} (2,882.0/sq mi)
- Time zone: UTC+9 (Japan Standard Time)
- Phone number: 0280-92-3111
- Address: 2248 Shimoōno, Koga-shi, Ibaraki-ken 306-0291
- Climate: Cfa
- Website: Official website
- Symbols
- Flower: Prunus persica
- Tree: Zelkova serrata

Koga (古河市, Koga-shi) is a city located in Ibaraki Prefecture, Japan. As of 1 January 2024, the city had an estimated population of 137,512 in 58,276 households and a population density of 1113 persons per km². The percentage of the population aged over 65 was 28.98%. The total area of the city is 123.58 square kilometres (47.71 sq mi).

== Geography ==
Koga is located in the extreme southwestern corner of Ibaraki Prefecture. Located almost in the center of the Kanto Plain, the city is very flat. The Tone River flows eastward in the southern part of the city and the Watarase River flows through the west and joins the Tone River north of the Tonegawa Bridge.The altitude of the northern part is slightly higher than that of the southern part, and the rivers that flow through the city flow from north to south except for the Tone River.

=== Surrounding municipalities ===
Ibaraki Prefecture

- Bandō
- Goka
- Sakai
- Yachiyo
- Yūki

Saitama Prefecture

- Kazo
- Kuki

Tochigi Prefecture

- Nogi
- Oyama
- Tochigi

=== Climate ===
Koga has a humid subtropical climate (Köppen Cfa) characterized by warm summers and cool winters with light snowfall. The average annual temperature in Koga is 14.9 °C (58.8 °F). The average annual rainfall is 1,229.9 mm (48.42 in) with September as the wettest month. The temperatures are highest on average in August, at around 26.8 °C (80.2 °F), and lowest in January, at around 3.6 °C (38.5 °F).

Climate data for Koga (1991−2020 normals, extremes 1978−present)
Month	Jan	Feb	Mar	Apr	May	Jun	Jul	Aug	Sep	Oct	Nov	Dec	Year
Record high °C (°F)	18.8 (65.8)	23.4 (74.1)	26.1 (79.0)	31.4 (88.5)	35.1 (95.2)	38.0 (100.4)	40.0 (104.0)	39.6 (103.3)	38.2 (100.8)	33.1 (91.6)	24.7 (76.5)	25.3 (77.5)	40.0 (104.0)
Mean daily maximum °C (°F)	9.2 (48.6)	10.3 (50.5)	14.0 (57.2)	19.6 (67.3)	24.1 (75.4)	26.6 (79.9)	30.6 (87.1)	32.0 (89.6)	27.8 (82.0)	21.9 (71.4)	16.4 (61.5)	11.4 (52.5)	20.3 (68.6)
Daily mean °C (°F)	3.6 (38.5)	4.6 (40.3)	8.2 (46.8)	13.5 (56.3)	18.4 (65.1)	21.8 (71.2)	25.6 (78.1)	26.8 (80.2)	23.0 (73.4)	17.2 (63.0)	11.0 (51.8)	5.8 (42.4)	15.0 (58.9)
Mean daily minimum °C (°F)	−1.3 (29.7)	−0.5 (31.1)	2.9 (37.2)	8.0 (46.4)	13.6 (56.5)	18.0 (64.4)	21.9 (71.4)	23.0 (73.4)	19.3 (66.7)	13.2 (55.8)	6.3 (43.3)	0.9 (33.6)	10.4 (50.8)
Record low °C (°F)	−11.9 (10.6)	−8.3 (17.1)	−4.8 (23.4)	−1.4 (29.5)	2.3 (36.1)	10.6 (51.1)	14.5 (58.1)	15.6 (60.1)	8.4 (47.1)	2.1 (35.8)	−2.4 (27.7)	−6.3 (20.7)	−11.9 (10.6)
Average precipitation mm (inches)	35.2 (1.39)	35.1 (1.38)	75.9 (2.99)	91.3 (3.59)	120.8 (4.76)	132.0 (5.20)	147.3 (5.80)	135.8 (5.35)	181.4 (7.14)	166.1 (6.54)	61.6 (2.43)	37.7 (1.48)	1,229.9 (48.42)
Average precipitation days (≥ 1.0 mm)	3.9	4.6	8.6	9.4	11.0	12.1	11.6	8.6	11.0	10.2	6.0	4.2	101.2
Mean monthly sunshine hours	208.7	195.1	197.2	190.6	184.7	128.6	144.7	168.1	133.1	145.1	165.0	188.5	2,049.5
Source: Japan Meteorological Agency

== Demographics ==
Per Japanese census data, the population of Koga peaked around the year 2000 and has declined slightly since.

Historical population
Year	Pop.	±%
1950	78,478	—
1960	82,446	+5.1%
1970	97,659	+18.5%
1980	117,691	+20.5%
1990	139,239	+18.3%
2000	146,452	+5.2%
2010	142,995	−2.4%
2020	139,344	−2.6%

== History ==
Koga was settled in the Jōmon period and already known as a ferry port on the Watarase River in the Nara period and is mentioned in the Man'yōshū. During the Heian period it was the site of an iron smelter and kilns for production of ceramics and roof tiles and was one of the largest centers for iron production in eastern Japan . During the Muromachi period it was the location of the Koga kubō, a secondary government created by the Ashikaga shogunate to rule eastern Japan. In the Sengoku period, it developed into a castle town and during the Edo period became the seat of the daimyō of Koga Domain under the Edo period Tokugawa shogunate and a station on the Nikkō Kaidō highway.

The town of Koga was established on April 1, 1889, with the creation of the modern municipalities system. It was raised to city status on August 1, 1950. On September 12, 2005, Koga absorbed the towns of Sanwa and Sōwa (both from Sashima District) to create the new and expanded city of Koga. The new city hall is now located at the former town of Sōwa.

== Government ==
Koga has a mayor-council form of government with a directly elected mayor and a unicameral city council of 24 members. Koga contributes three members to the Ibaraki Prefectural Assembly. In terms of national politics, the city is part of Ibaraki 7th district of the lower house of the Diet of Japan.

== Economy ==
Koga was known in the Meiji era through the prewar Shōwa era as a center for sericulture. At present, the economy is highly industrialized, with the number of factories as second within Ibaraki Prefecture, after Hitachi city.

KDDI Corp.’s Yamata Transmitting Station, the only shortwave station still in business in Japan, is located in Yamata (now Koga, Ibaraki). The station started broadcasts on 1 January 1941. The announcement of Japan’s surrender by Emperor Hirohito, in 1945, was transmitted from this station to the Japanese military personnel located overseas.

== Education ==
Koga has 23 public elementary schools and nine public middle schools operated by the city government, and five public high schools operated by the Ibaraki Prefectural Board of Education. In addition, there is one private high school.

== Transportation ==
bus JR East – Tōhoku Main Line

- Koga

=== Highway ===
- National Route 4
- National Route 125
- National Route 354

== Sister cities ==
- Sanhe, Hebei, China

== Local attractions ==
- site of Koga Castle
- site of Koga Kubo residence
- Suzume-jinja
- Hase Kannon temple
- Koga History Museum
- Sogo Koen Park, near the Watarase River, was formally a summer palace for a local daimyo. It has two restored 17th century farmhouses, like including the Nakayama house and Takami Senseki house/museum.
- Navel Park in Sowa-machi has outdoor and barbecue facilities for families.
- Koga west of the station is old and has many old buildings. Many of the streets are cobbled.
- Tenkoku Art Museum.

== Notable people ==
- Hideo Jinpu, politician
- Kawanabe Kyōsai, artist
- Reiko Okano, manga artist
- Okuhara Seiko, artist
- Koji Yamamuro, Olympic gymnast
