= Naganuma Castle =

Castle in Naganuma, Sukugawa, Fukushima Prefecture, Japan

Naganuma Castle 長沼城
- Naganuma, Fukushima Prefecture, Japan

Site information
- Type: flatland-mountain castle
- Owner: None
- Open to the public: Yes
- Condition: Destroyed

Location
- Coordinates: 37°17′34″N 140°12′40″E
- Height: 40 meters

Site history
- Built: 1260
- Built by: Takatoki Naganuma
- Materials: Stone and Clay
- Fate: Demolished in accordance with a decree mandating no more than one castle per province
- Demolished: 1615

Garrison information
- Past commanders: Naganuma, Nikaido, Ashina, Uesugi, Gamo

Naganuma Castle (長沼城) was a Japanese castle located in Naganuma, Fukushima Prefecture, Japan. The site has 300 cherry blossom trees.

== History ==
This castle is thought to have been built by Takatoki Naganuma in 1260 (Bun'ō gannen). The castle is possibly the main base for the Naganuma clan, a branch of the Oyama clan, which is a traditional samurai clan of the Nasu area of the Tochigi prefecture.

In the mid-15th century, the Naganuma clan moved their main base to the Shigiyama castle in the captured Aizu Tajima area, but kept the Naganuma castle. Following an alliance in approximately 1560 with the Ashina clan (Japan), which soon declined due to military overextension and the death of an heir, the Naganuma clan had a brief alliance with the Date clan.

After the Date clan fell out of favor with central ruler Toyotomi Hideyoshi, control of the castle transferred to the warlord Gamō Ujisato, who rebuilt a number of hill castles, including Naganuma Castle, on the model of his own Matsusaka Castle.

Upon his death, his territory was transferred to Uesugi Kagekatsu (1556-1623), who posted Tadanao Shimazu, an important retainer, in the Naganuma Castle. The castle was probably destroyed after a 1615 (Genna gannen) decree mandating only one castle per province (一国一城令).

== Structure ==
The castle is located on Hidakami-Yama mountain, a peninsula-like hill of 40 meters in height spreading from the Taishaku mountains toward Koriyama basin, at the center of the former Naganuma Town. Naganuma town is located in a valley formed by the Ebana-Gawa river and Sunoko-Gawa river at the western edge of the Koriyama basin, in the western part of current Sukagawa.

The central area of Naganuma castle is a pentagonal, about 70 x 50 meters. At the west side of the central area sits an oblong area about 50 meters long with a stone wall on its south side. Another long and narrow area is at the east side. These three areas at the top of the hill likely were constructed by the Naganuma or Ashina clans. Surrounding these core areas, several terraces of about 40 meters long were built halfway down the hill. These areas are connected by a small buffer area formed by clay walls. While the western part of the castle is connected to the mountains behind it, this side is protected by a deep dry moat about 20 meters wide.

The total size of the upper hill area is about 250 x 100 meters, making it a moderately-sized branch castle. The east side of the hill is not protected by marsh. A line of outer barriers separated two rivers. Though most of this part of the castle is lost, a line of clay wall and a dry moat with the shape of a gate remains on private property. The size of the outer barrier is extremely large for a branch castle, and this shows the importance of Naganuma castle for the Gamo clan.

Every spring the castle site, now a park, becomes fully covered by cherry blossoms.

== See also ==
- Miharu Takizakura
- Nihonmatsu Castle
- Aizuwakamatsu Castle
