= Sugama Tōfuku-ji Stone Reliquary =

Kamakura-period stone reliquary monument

Sugama Tōfukuji Stone Reliquary
- 須釜東福寺舎利石塔 (Japanese)
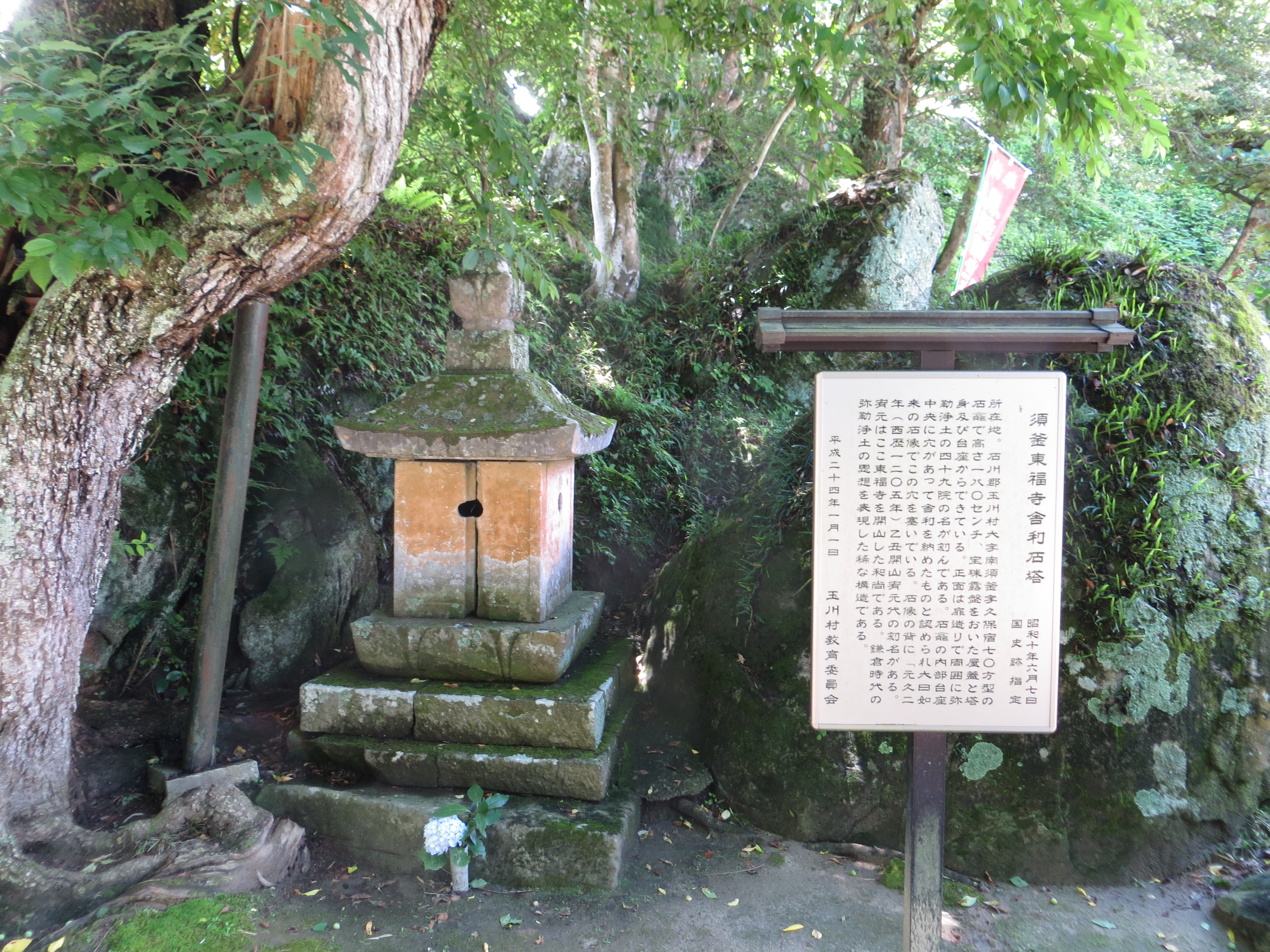
- Sugama Tōfukuji Stone Reliquary

- Shimotoriwata Memorial Stele Sugama Tōfuku-ji Stone Reliquary (Japan)
- 37°12′15″N 140°27′18″E
- Type: monument
- Periods: Kamakura period
- Location: Tamakawa, Fukushima, Japan
- Region: Tōhoku region

Site notes
- Public access: Yes

Sugama Tōfukuji Stone Reliquary (須釜東福寺舎利石塔, Sugama Tōfukuji shari sekitō) is a Kamakura period stone reliquary monument located within the grounds of the temple of Tōfuku-ji in the village of Tamakawa, Fukushima Prefecture, in the Tōhoku region of northern Japan. The stele was designated a National Historic Site of Japan in 1935 by the Japanese government.

== Overview ==
The monument is made of andesite and has a height of 180 cm. It is the form of a square tower with a lotus-base and a jewel-roof. The tower is hollow and has a stone door in front, and is thought to have once housed a Śarīra relic. The location within the monument where a relic would normally be located is now occupied by a stone status of Dainichi Nyōrai. An inscription of the back of the statue gives the date of 1205 AD. On the doors of the shrine is an inscription with the names of 49 temples in the vicinity dedicated to the Pure Land of the Miroku Bosatsu.

The monument is located about 20 minutes by car from Izumigo Station on the JR East Tohoku Main Line.

== See also ==
- List of Historic Sites of Japan (Fukushima)
