= Uzumine =

Uzumine Castle
- 宇津峰
- Kōriyama and Sukagawa, Fukushima Prefecture, Japan
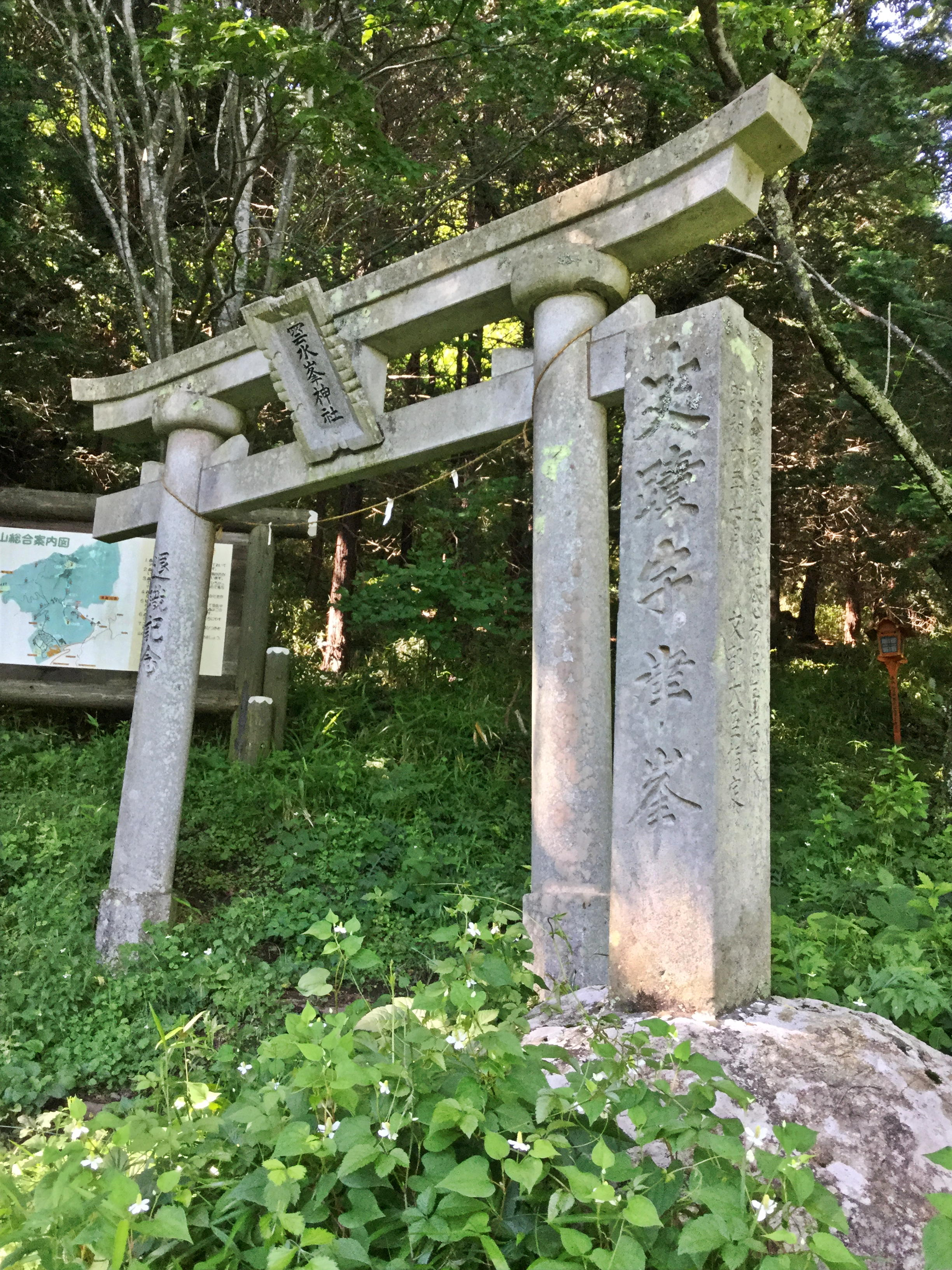
- Entrance to Uzumine

Site information
- Type: yamashiro-style Japanese castle
- Open to the public: yes

Location
- Coordinates: 37°17′49.2″N 140°28′0.12″E

Site history
- Built: c.1340
- Built by: Tamura Morihide
- In use: Nanboku-chō period
- Demolished: c. 1354

Uzumine (宇津峰) was a Nanboku-chō period Yamashiro-style Japanese castle located on Mount Uzumine, a mountain with an altitude of 677 metres (2,221 ft), at the border between the cities of Kōriyama and Sukagawa in Fukushima Prefecture, Japan. The castle was also known as "Hoshiga-jō" (星が城) of "Unsui-mine" (雲水峯). The site was designated a National Historic Site of Japan in 1951.

== History ==
During the early Muromachi period, the entire mountain was fortified by Tamura Morihide, a powerful local warlord who controlled much of southern Mutsu Province. Support for the Southern Court was strong in northern Japan during the early Nanboku-chō period; however, after the death of the Chinjufu shōgun Kitabatake Akinobu and the general Yūki Munehiro in 1339, the tide began to turning favor of the Northern Court. In 1346, both Mount Uzumine and Mount Ryōzen, another fortified mountain castle of the Southern Dynasty, fell to an attack from Northern forces. It was recovered by Southern forces under Kitabatake Akinobu in the Kannō disturbance of 1352. He was accompanied by Prince Morinaga, a grandson of Emperor Go-Daigo, who even adopted the name of "Prince Uzumine" to commemorate the victory. The Southern forces were unable to maintain their momentum, and were pushed back from Mount Uzumine in May 1353. Kitakatake Akinobu and Prince Morinaga escaped the fall of the castle and flex to Dewa Province; however, after the fall of Mount Uzumine, the conflict in Mutsu Province came to an end with the Northern Court victorious. The Tamura clan were also destroyed by this see-saw campaign, and the later Tamura clan who ruled Miharu Castle during the Sengoku period were not related.

Only a few scattered ruins remain of the castle today. These include a kuruwa enclosure with 1,8 meter high earthen ramparts towards the western end of the castle ruins, the remains of a dry moat in the eastern end, and several area of the mountain which have been artificially flattened. The site is located approximately 5 minutes by car from Oshioe Station on the JR East Suigun Line.

== See also ==
- List of Historic Sites of Japan (Fukushima)

== Literature ==
- Motoo, Hinago (1986). Japanese Castles. Tokyo: Kodansha. p. 200 pages. ISBN 0-87011-766-1.
