= Tamakawa, Fukushima =

Tamakawa 玉川村
- Village
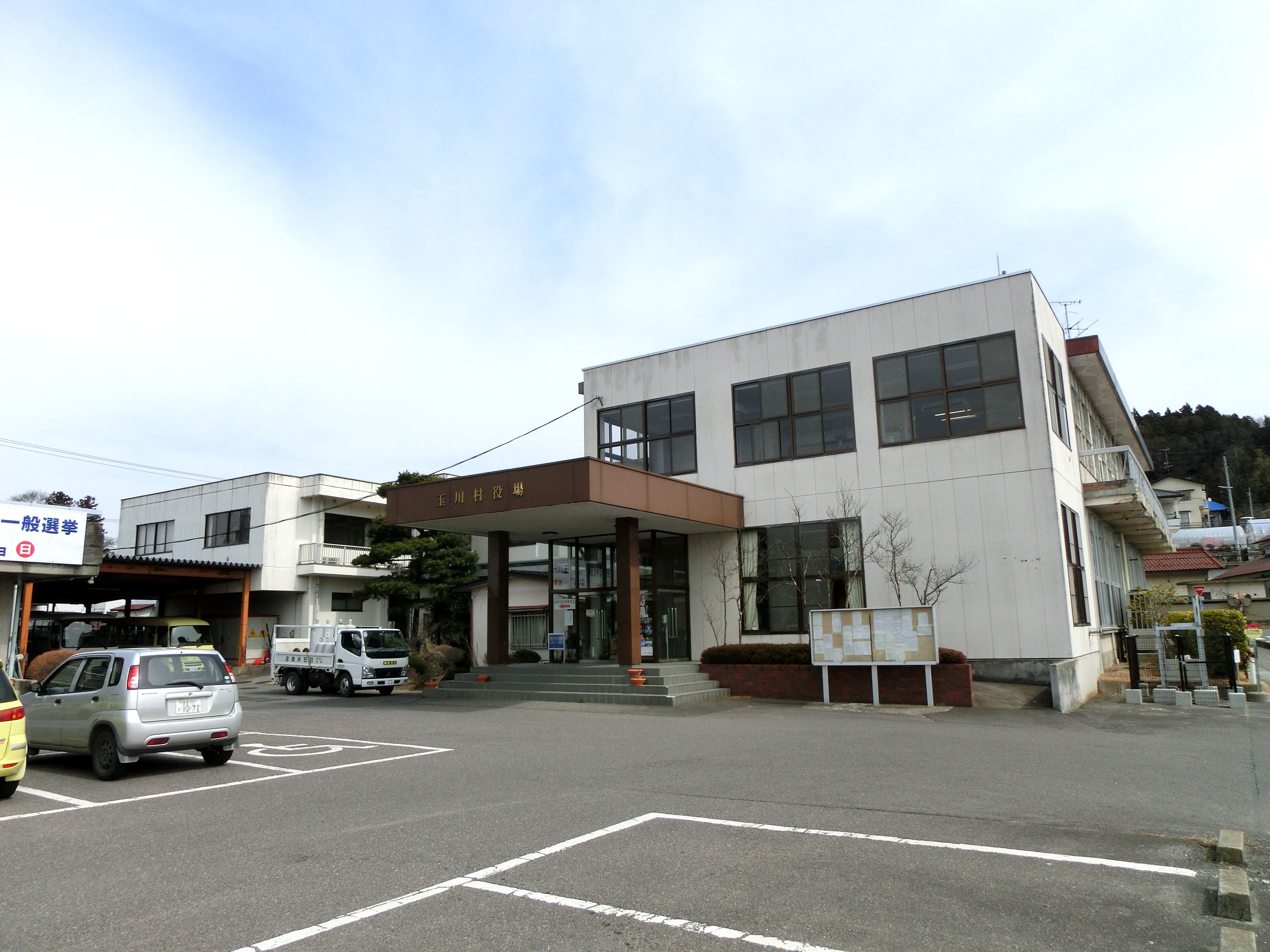
- Tamakawa Village Hall

- Flag Seal

- Location of Tamakawa in Fukushima Prefecture

- Coordinates: 37°12′38.6″N 140°24′32.4″E
- Country: Japan
- Region: Tōhoku
- Prefecture: Fukushima
- District: Ishikawa

Area
  - Total: 46.67 km^{2} (18.02 sq mi)

Population (March 2020)
  - Total: 6,497
  - Density: 139.2/km^{2} (360.6/sq mi)
- Time zone: UTC+9 (Japan Standard Time)
- Phone number: 0247-57-3101
- Address: Kodaka Nakawatecho 9-banchi Tamagawa-mura, Ishikawa-gun, Fukushima-ken 963-6312
- Climate: Cfa
- Website: Official website
- Symbols
- Bird: Oriental turtle dove
- Flower: Cherry blossom
- Tree: Pinus densiflora

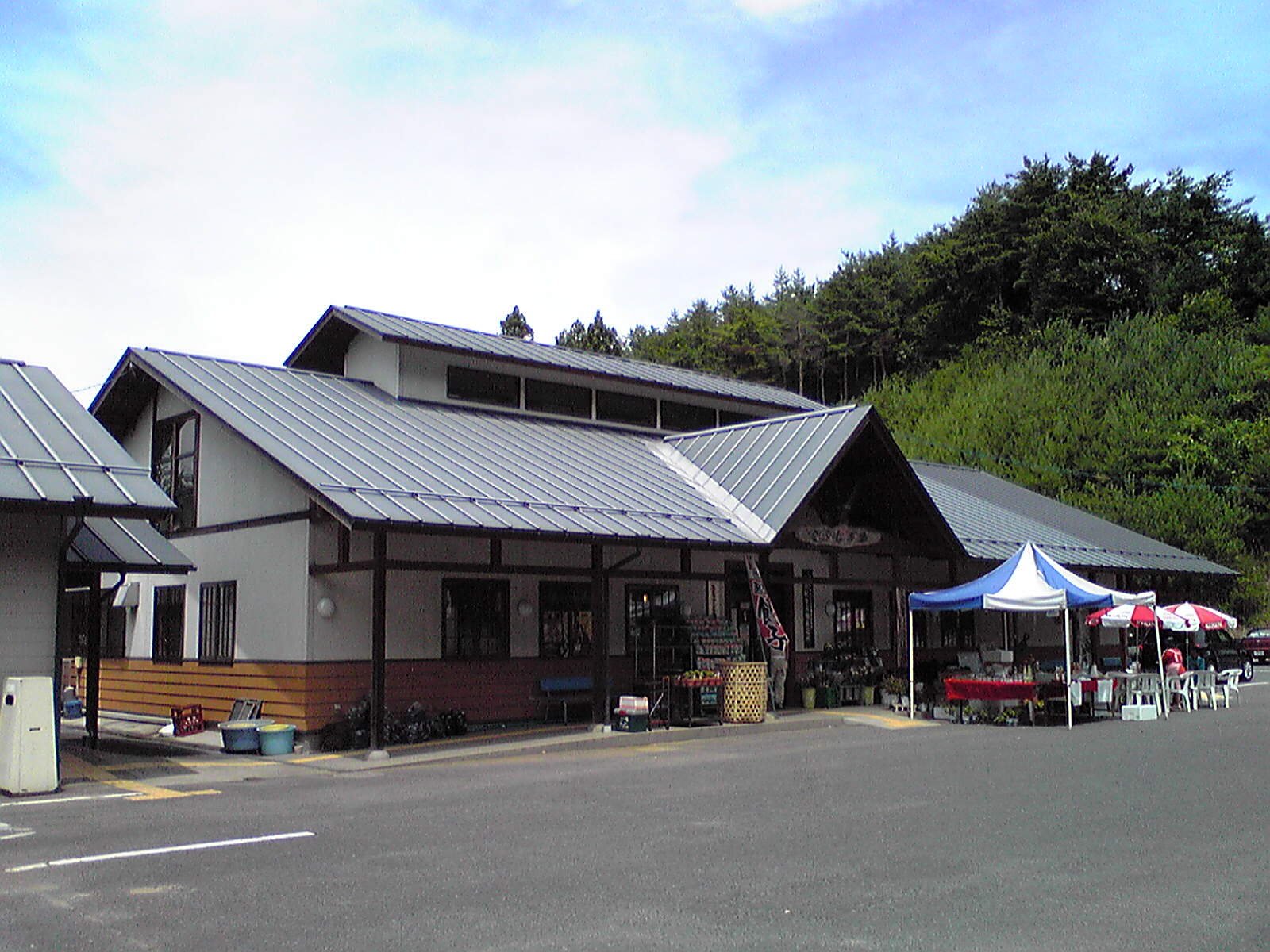
Tamakawa, Roadside Station

Tamakawa (玉川村, Tamakawa-mura) is a village located in Fukushima Prefecture, Japan. As of 1 March 2020, the village had an estimated population of 6,497 in 2143 households, and a population density of 140 per km^{2}. The total area of the village was 46.67 square kilometres (18.02 sq mi).

== Geography ==
Tamakawa is located in south-central Fukushima prefecture at an average altitude of 262 meters.

- Mountains: Kannondake
- Rivers: Abukuma River

=== Climate ===
Tamakawa has a humid subtropical climate (Köppen climate classification Cfa). The average annual temperature in Tamakawa is 11.2 °C (52.2 °F). The average annual rainfall is 1,344 mm (52.9 in) with September as the wettest month.

Climate data for Tamakawa, Fukushima (2003−2020 normals, extremes 2003−present)
Month	Jan	Feb	Mar	Apr	May	Jun	Jul	Aug	Sep	Oct	Nov	Dec	Year
Record high °C (°F)	14.4 (57.9)	19.0 (66.2)	22.2 (72.0)	28.1 (82.6)	32.9 (91.2)	33.3 (91.9)	34.9 (94.8)	35.5 (95.9)	33.4 (92.1)	27.3 (81.1)	23.0 (73.4)	19.1 (66.4)	35.5 (95.9)
Mean daily maximum °C (°F)	4.1 (39.4)	5.2 (41.4)	9.4 (48.9)	15.3 (59.5)	21.1 (70.0)	24.3 (75.7)	27.0 (80.6)	28.8 (83.8)	24.6 (76.3)	18.6 (65.5)	13.1 (55.6)	7.1 (44.8)	16.6 (61.8)
Daily mean °C (°F)	0.3 (32.5)	0.9 (33.6)	4.3 (39.7)	9.8 (49.6)	15.5 (59.9)	19.2 (66.6)	22.6 (72.7)	23.9 (75.0)	19.9 (67.8)	14.0 (57.2)	8.5 (47.3)	3.0 (37.4)	11.8 (53.3)
Mean daily minimum °C (°F)	−3.2 (26.2)	−3.0 (26.6)	−0.3 (31.5)	4.6 (40.3)	10.3 (50.5)	15.1 (59.2)	19.2 (66.6)	20.3 (68.5)	16.2 (61.2)	9.9 (49.8)	3.9 (39.0)	−0.9 (30.4)	7.7 (45.8)
Record low °C (°F)	−10.2 (13.6)	−9.7 (14.5)	−7.3 (18.9)	−4.3 (24.3)	2.0 (35.6)	5.9 (42.6)	11.2 (52.2)	12.0 (53.6)	5.0 (41.0)	0.2 (32.4)	−6.0 (21.2)	−7.7 (18.1)	−10.2 (13.6)
Average precipitation mm (inches)	27.3 (1.07)	28.1 (1.11)	63.4 (2.50)	97.6 (3.84)	92.3 (3.63)	108.8 (4.28)	192.0 (7.56)	153.6 (6.05)	154.7 (6.09)	152.2 (5.99)	60.9 (2.40)	43.8 (1.72)	1,174.7 (46.25)
Average rainy days (≥ 1.0 mm)	4.3	5.1	8.5	9.1	9.4	10.8	14.8	11.5	10.6	9.1	6.6	5.9	105.7
Source: Japan Meteorological Agency

=== Neighboring municipalities ===
- Fukushima Prefecture
  - Hirata
  - Ishikawa
  - Kagamiishi
  - Sukagawa
  - Yabuki

== Demographics ==
According to Japanese census data, the population of Tamakawa has remained relatively stable since 1970.

Historical population
Year	Pop.	±%
1920	6,268	—
1930	6,887	+9.9%
1940	7,268	+5.5%
1950	9,014	+24.0%
1960	8,556	−5.1%
1970	7,480	−12.6%
1980	7,431	−0.7%
1990	7,631	+2.7%
2000	7,680	+0.6%
2010	7,231	−5.8%
2020	6,392	−11.6%

== History ==
The area of present-day Tamakawa was part of ancient Mutsu Province. The area was mostly tenryō territory under the direct control of the Tokugawa shogunate during the Edo period. After the Meiji Restoration, it was organized as part of Ishikawa District in the Nakadōri region of Iwashiro Province. The villages of Izumi and Sugama were established with the creation of the modern municipalities system on April 1, 1889. Tamagawa Village was formed on March 31, 1955, by the merger of the two villages.

== Economy ==
Tamakawa has a mixed economy of agriculture and light/precision manufacturing.

== Education ==
Tamakawa has two public elementary schools and two public junior high schools operated by the village government. The village does not have a high school.

- Tamakawa First Elementary School
- Tamakawa Sugama Elementary School
- Tamakawa Izumi Middle School
- Tamakawa Sugama Middle School

== Transportation ==
=== Airports ===
- Fukushima Airport

=== Railway ===
JR East – Suigun Line

- Kawabeoki – Izumigō

=== Highway ===
- Abukuma Kōgen Road
- National Route 118

== International relations ==
- Lugu, Nantou, Taiwan, Republic of China

== Local attractions ==
- Sugama Tōfuku-ji Stone Reliquary, National Historic Site
