= Shōnindan temple ruins =

Archaeological site in Fukushima, Japan

- 上人壇廃寺跡
- Location within Fukushima Prefecture Location within Japan

Religion
- Affiliation: Buddhist
- Status: ruins

Location
- Location: Sukagawa, Fukushima
- Country: Japan
- Interactive map of Shōnindan temple ruins
- Coordinates: 37°18′08″N 140°22′24″E

Shōnindan Haiji Site (上人壇廃寺跡, Shōnindan Haiji iseki) is an archaeological site with the ruins of a Nara period Buddhist temple located in what is now the city of Sukagawa, Fukushima, Japan. The temple no longer exists, but the temple grounds were designated as a National Historic Site by the Japanese government in 1968. The actual name of the temple is unknown.

== History ==
The temple site is immediately north of modern Sukagawa Station and was discovered in 1961 when the Tohoku Main Line railway underwent construction work for double-tracking and electrification. The temple layout is in the standard layout for a provincial temple, as established in each of the provinces of Japan by Emperor Shōmu during the Nara period (710 – 794), aligned on a north-south axis with a large main gate to the south, a Kondō and a Pagoda side-by side, and a large lecture hall, all of which was surrounded by a cloister-like wall. The temple also had rare hexagonal-shaped roof tiles.

The date of the construction of the temple is contemporary with the creation of the short-lived Iwase Province in 718 out of five districts of Mutsu Province: Shirakawa (白河), Iwase (石背), Aizu (会津), Asaka (安積) and Shinobu (信夫), and from the layout of the temple, it can be assumed that the provincial capital of Iwase Province was located nearby. Iwase Province was reabsorbed back into Mutsu some time between 722 and 724.

The site is located approximately ten minutes on foot from Sukagawa Station. It was backfilled after excavation, so there is nothing visible at the site except for a stone monument and wooden placard.

== See also ==
- List of Historic Sites of Japan (Fukushima)
