= Kawahigashi Station (Fukushima) =

Railway station in Sukagawa, Fukushima Prefecture, Japan

Kawahigashi Station 川東駅
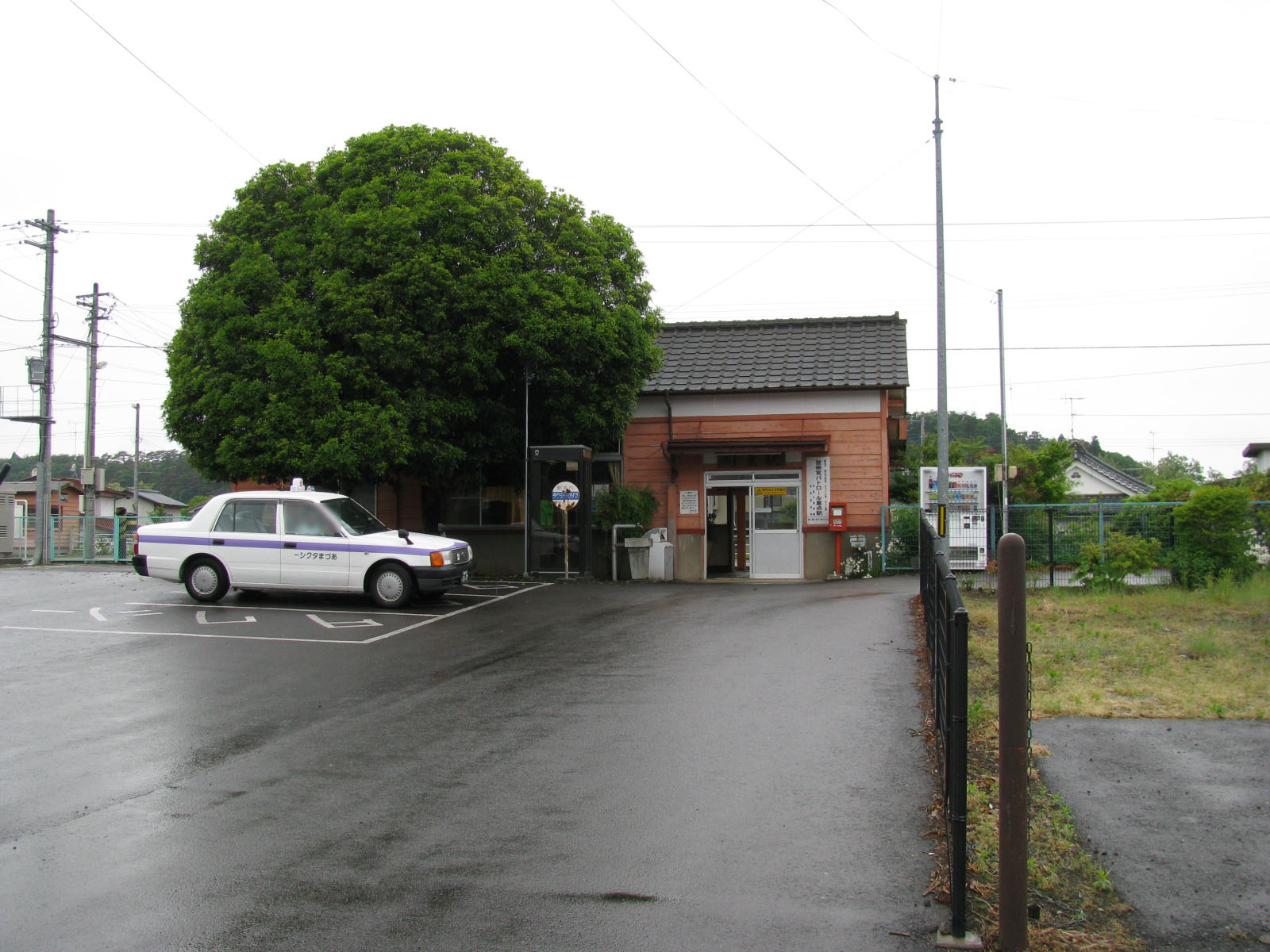
- Kawahigashi Station in May 2008

General information
- Location: Kosakuda Nishidate 132, Sukagawa-shi, Fukushima-ken 962-0727; Japan
- Coordinates: 37°16′11″N 140°24′22″E
- Operator: JR East
- Line: ■ Suigun Line
- Distance: 122.2 km from Mito
- Platforms: 1 side platform
- Tracks: 2

Other information
- Status: Unstaffed
- Website: Official website

History
- Opened: October 10, 1931

Passengers

Services
Preceding station	JR East	Following station
Izumigō towards Mito	Suigun Line	Oshioe towards Kōriyama
Location
- Location within Fukushima Prefecture Location within Japan

Kawahigashi Station (川東駅, Kawahigashi-eki) is a railway station in the city of Sukagawa, Fukushima, Japan operated by the East Japan Railway Company (JR East).

== Lines ==
Kawahigashi Station is served by the Suigun Line, and is located 122.2 rail kilometers from the official starting point of the line at Mito.

== Station layout ==
The station has two opposed side platforms connected to the station building by a footbridge; however, one of the platforms in no longer in use, and the overhead passageway has been discontinued, rendering the station effectively a single side platform station serving a single bi-directional track. The station is unattended.

== History ==
Kawahigashi Station opened on October 10, 1931. The station was absorbed into the JR East network upon the privatization of the Japanese National Railways (JNR) on April 1, 1987.

== Surrounding area ==
- Kawahigashi Post Office
- Abukuma River
- Wada no Daibutsu

== See also ==
- List of railway stations in Japan
