= Nogisawa Station =

Railway station in Ishikawa, Fukushima Prefecture, Japan

Nogisawa Station 野木沢駅
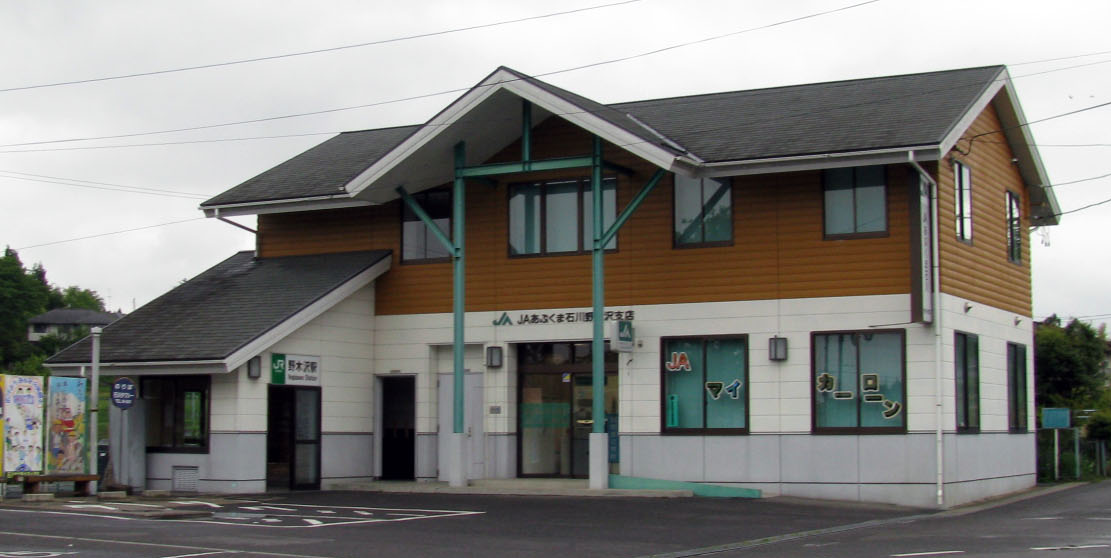
- Nogisawa Station in May 2008

General information
- Location: Nakano Mizuuchi 4, Ishikawa-machi, Ishikawa-gun, Fukushima-ken 963-7837; Japan
- Coordinates: 37.1754°N 140.4208°E
- Operator: JR East
- Line: ■ Suigun Line
- Distance: 110.1 km from Mito
- Platforms: 1 side platform
- Tracks: 1

Other information
- Status: Unstaffed
- Website: Official website

History
- Opened: December 4, 1934

Passengers
- FY2004: 148 (daily)

Services
Preceding station	JR East	Following station
Iwaki-Ishikawa towards Mito	Suigun Line	Kawabeoki towards Kōriyama
Location
- Location within Fukushima Prefecture Location within Japan

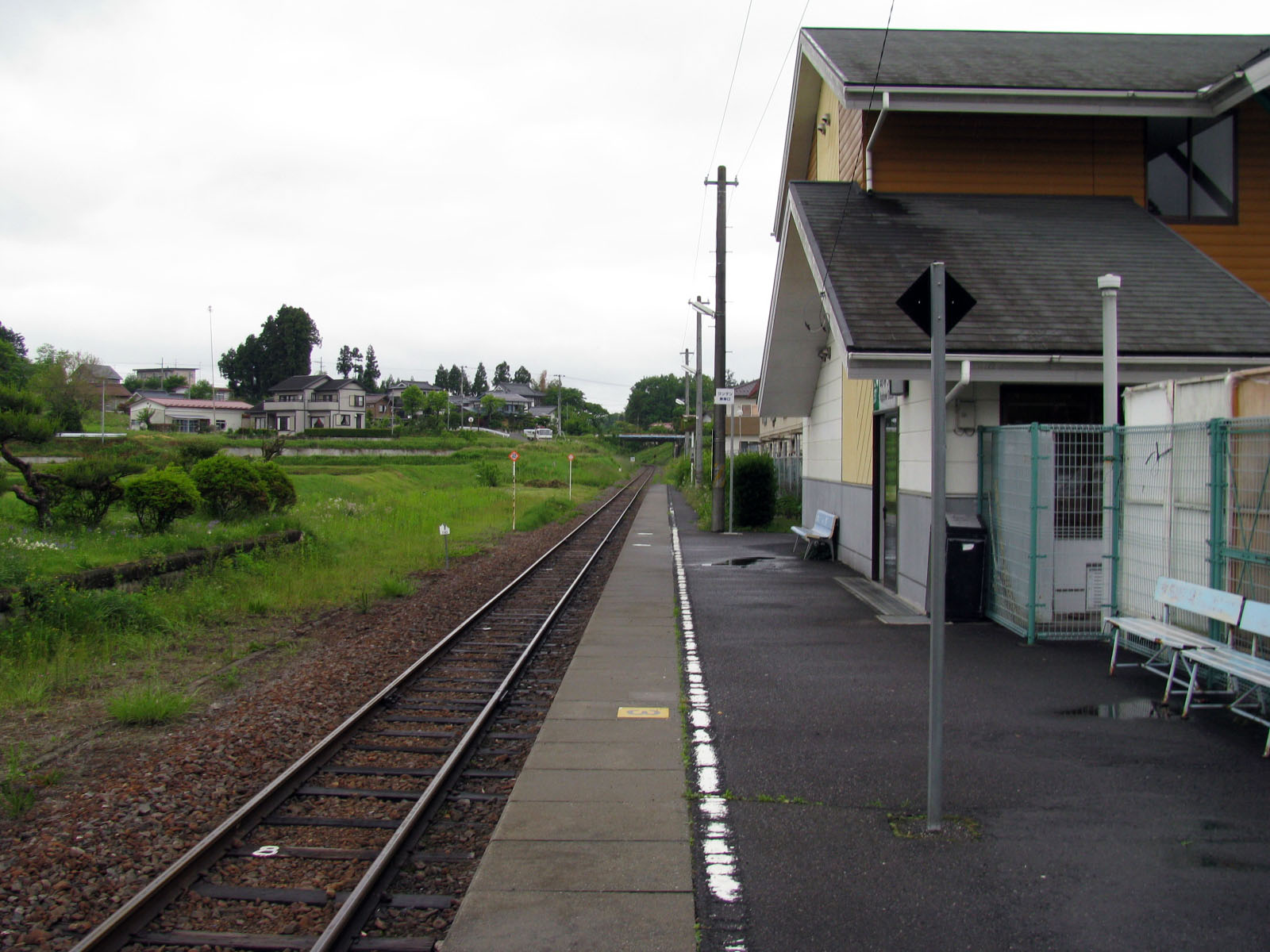
Platform

Nogisawa Station (野木沢駅, Nogisawa-eki) is a railway station in the town of Ishikawa, Fukushima, Japan operated by East Japan Railway Company (JR East).

== Lines ==
Nogisawa Station is served by the Suigun Line, and is located 110.1 rail kilometers from the official starting point of the line at Mito.

== Station layout ==
Nogisawa Station has one side platform serving a single bi-directional track. The station formerly had two opposed side platforms, but one of the platforms is no longer in use. The station is unattended.

== History ==
The station opened on December 4, 1934. The station was absorbed into the JR East network upon the privatization of the Japanese National Railways (JNR) on April 1, 1987.

== Surrounding area ==
- Nogisawa Post Office
- National Route 118

== See also ==
- List of railway stations in Japan
