= Iwase, Fukushima =

Iwase 岩瀬村
- Village
- Flag Seal

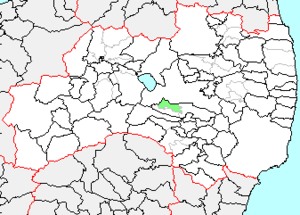
- Coordinates: 37°17′25″N 140°12′50″E
- Country: Japan
- Region: Tōhoku
- Prefecture: Fukushima
- District: Iwase

Area
  - Total: 64.23 km^{2} (24.80 sq mi)

Population (2003)
  - Total: 5,993
  - Density: 93.31/km^{2} (241.7/sq mi)
- Time zone: UTC+9 (Japan Standard Time)
- Tree: Pinus densiflora
- Flower: Gentiana scabra
- Bird: Parus varius
- Address: 22, Nakajimae, Hashirata, Iwase village, Fukushima prefecture

Iwase in Japan

Iwase (岩瀬村, Iwase-mura) was a village located in Iwase District, Fukushima Prefecture, Japan.

As of 2003, the village had an estimated population of 5,993 and a density of 93.31 persons per km^{2}. The total area was 64.23 km^{2}.

== History ==
Shirakata village merged the Shirae village and it was Iwase village in 1955.

On April 1, 2005, Iwase, along with the town of Naganuma (also from Iwase District), was merged into the expanded city of Sukagawa

== Education ==
・Shirakata Primary School

・Shirae Primary School

・Iwase Junior High School

== Event ==
A Japanese drone meeting held at Iwase yukyu no sato in every August.

== See also ==
・Naganuma, Fukushima

・Ten-ei, Fukushima

・Sukagawa, Fukushima
