= Fujinuma Dam =

Dam in Fukushima Prefecture, Japan

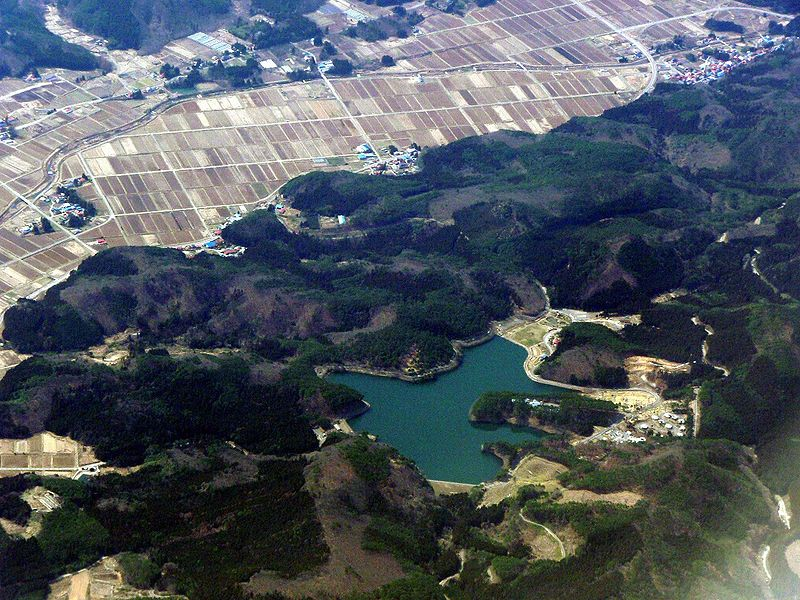
- Fujinuma Reservoir in 2009 with dam at center bottom, auxiliary dam on left edge of reservoir
- Interactive map of Fujinuma Dam
- Country: Japan
- Location: Sukagawa City
- Coordinates: 37°18′07″N 140°11′41″E
- Status: Failed
- Opening date: 1949
- Owner: Ebana River Coastal Reclamation District

Dam and spillways
- Type of dam: Embankment
- Impounds: Ebana River
- Height: 18.5 m (61 ft)
- Length: 133 m (436 ft)
- Width (crest): 6 m (20 ft)
- Dam volume: 99,000 m^{3} (3,496,152 ft^{3})

Reservoir
- Creates: Fujinuma Reservoir
- Total capacity: 1,504,000 m^{3} (1,219 acre⋅ft)
- Catchment area: 8.8 km^{2} (3 sq mi)
- Surface area: 20 ha (49 acres)

The Fujinuma Dam (藤沼ダム, Fujinuma Damu), was an earth-fill embankment dam in Sukagawa, Fukushima, Japan. It was established on the Ebana River, a tributary of the Abukuma River, 16 km (10 mi) west of the city office of Sukagawa City. Construction on the dam commenced in 1937 and it was completed in 1949 after construction was halted due to World War II. The dam's primary purpose was irrigation. It failed on 11 March 2011 after the 2011 Tōhoku earthquake.

== Failure ==
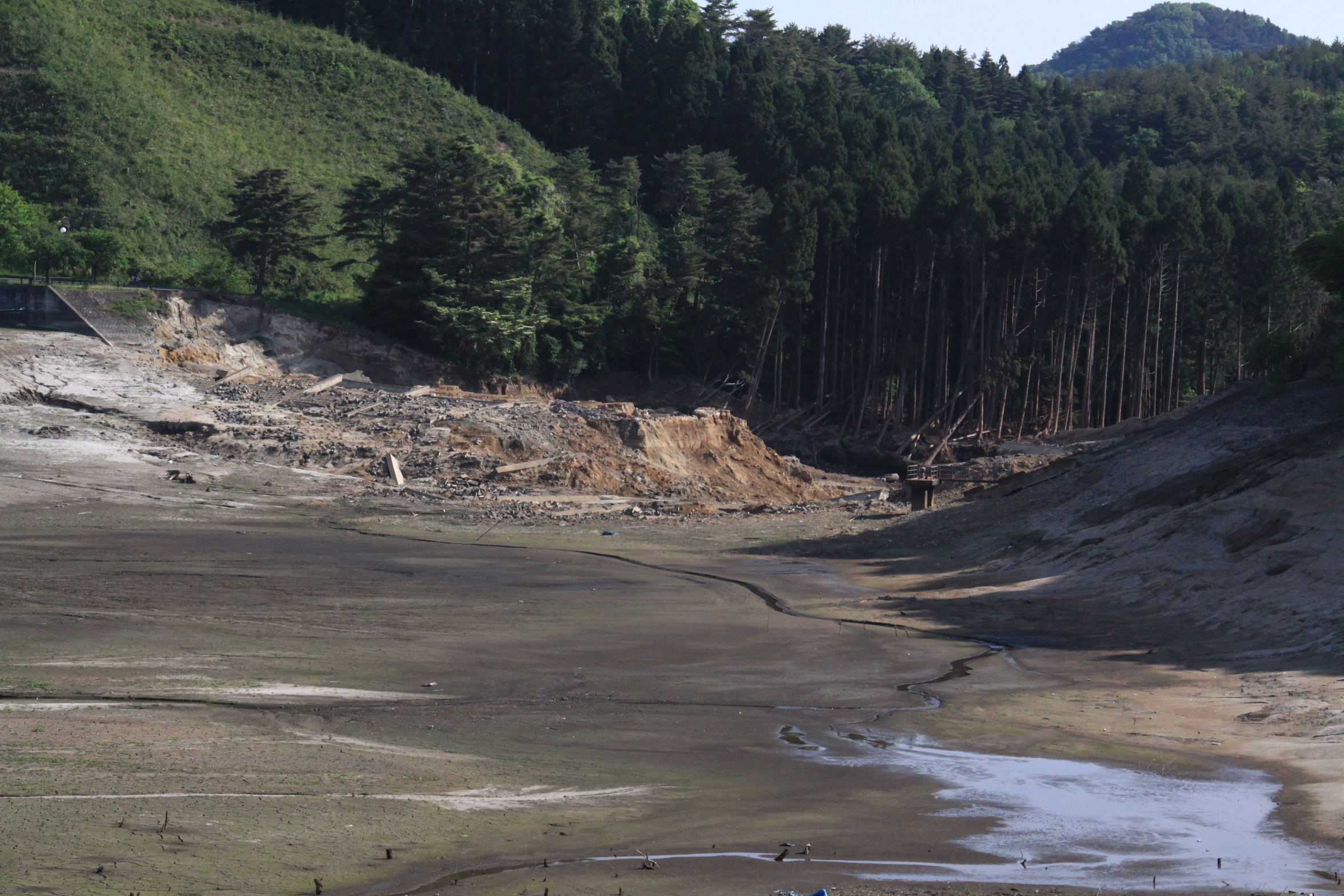
Empty reservoir and dam after collapse

On 11 March 2011, the dam failed 20 to 25 minutes after the Tōhoku earthquake as the nearly full reservoir overtopped the dam's crest. Locals reported hearing a loud burst before seeing a flood. The flood washed away five houses while damaging others, disabling a bridge and blocked roads with debris. Eight people were missing and four bodies were discovered after searches began at dawn. The failure of the earth-fill dam at the Fujinuma reservoir in Fukushima prefecture resulted in eight deaths in a village.

On 12 March, 252 dams were inspected and seven dams were found to be damaged. Six embankment dams had shallow cracking on their crests and the reservoir at one concrete gravity dam had a slight slope failure. Four dams, including the Fujinuma, were inaccessible and could not be inspected.

A preliminary survey of the dam and facilities conducted in April 2011 noted that the breach occurred at the tallest section of the dam. Within the dam's fill, there were layers of organic residual soil that in one area contained a tree stump. The residual soil was used as foundation and in layers as well – above alluvium. This suggests that the foundation for the dam was not prepared properly, according to the study. In addition, the reservoir's auxiliary dam suffered a severe slope failure on its upstream face while areas around the rim of the reservoir had mild slope failures or distress. It could not be confirmed whether the earthquake or a quick draining of the reservoir was the cause of this.

== Design ==
The dam was a 18.5 m (61 ft) tall and 133 m (436 ft) long embankment-type with a structural volume of 99,000 m^{3} (3,496,152 ft^{3}) and crest width of 6 m (20 ft). About 300 m (984 ft) to the south, there is an auxiliary dam with a height of about 6 m (20 ft) and length of approximately 60 m (197 ft). The auxiliary dam helped the reservoir maintain it designed levels given the topography wouldn't allow the single main dam to do so. The dam sat at the head of a 8.8 km^{2} (3 sq mi) drainage area and its reservoir had a capacity of 1,504,000 m^{3} (1,219 acre⋅ft). The reservoir had a surface area of 20 ha (49 acres). The dam was built by Shoji Kensetsu and operated by Ebana River Coastal Reclamation District.

== Society Responses ==
After the dam’s failure, there were conflicts between the governmental reviews and the citizens’ understanding of why the dam experienced such failure. Japanese national and Fukushima prefectural governments inspected and considered that the earthquake’s impact was significant damage triggered and stated it a natural disaster. Oppositely, the failure mentioned above, such as lack of workforce, knowledge, and proper materials in the construction process, the citizens doubt that this failure is a human-made disaster and the consequences of the construction failures; especially Sukagawa city is far away from the ocean to experience Tsunami, so, they couldn't consider it as a natural disaster.

These opposing opinions can also be seen in the discussion and conflict about disaster public assistance by the governing sectors. In Japan, when there is a natural disaster, there is a regulation of maximum financial support of 3 million yen, however, in this case, the citizens’ understanding of this dam failure was a human-made disaster, so the disaster public assistance financial support did not meet citizens’ needs and created this disaster to more complicated situation to battle against the governmental perspective on assistance and approach for dam failure, especially on recovery discussion.

== Recovery ==
Reconstruction of the dam started in October 2013, and was completed in April 2017.

=== Citizen's opinions ===
Although the recovery of this dam was completed in 2017, there were some unheard voices of citizens living near the once-failed dam. Three main arguments were: 1) recovery and water are needed for their agricultural business, 2) potential risk of flood to reconstruct at the same location, and 3) no dam is needed.

== See also ==
- Dam failure
