= Sukagawa Ichirizuka =

- 須賀川一里塚 (Japanese)
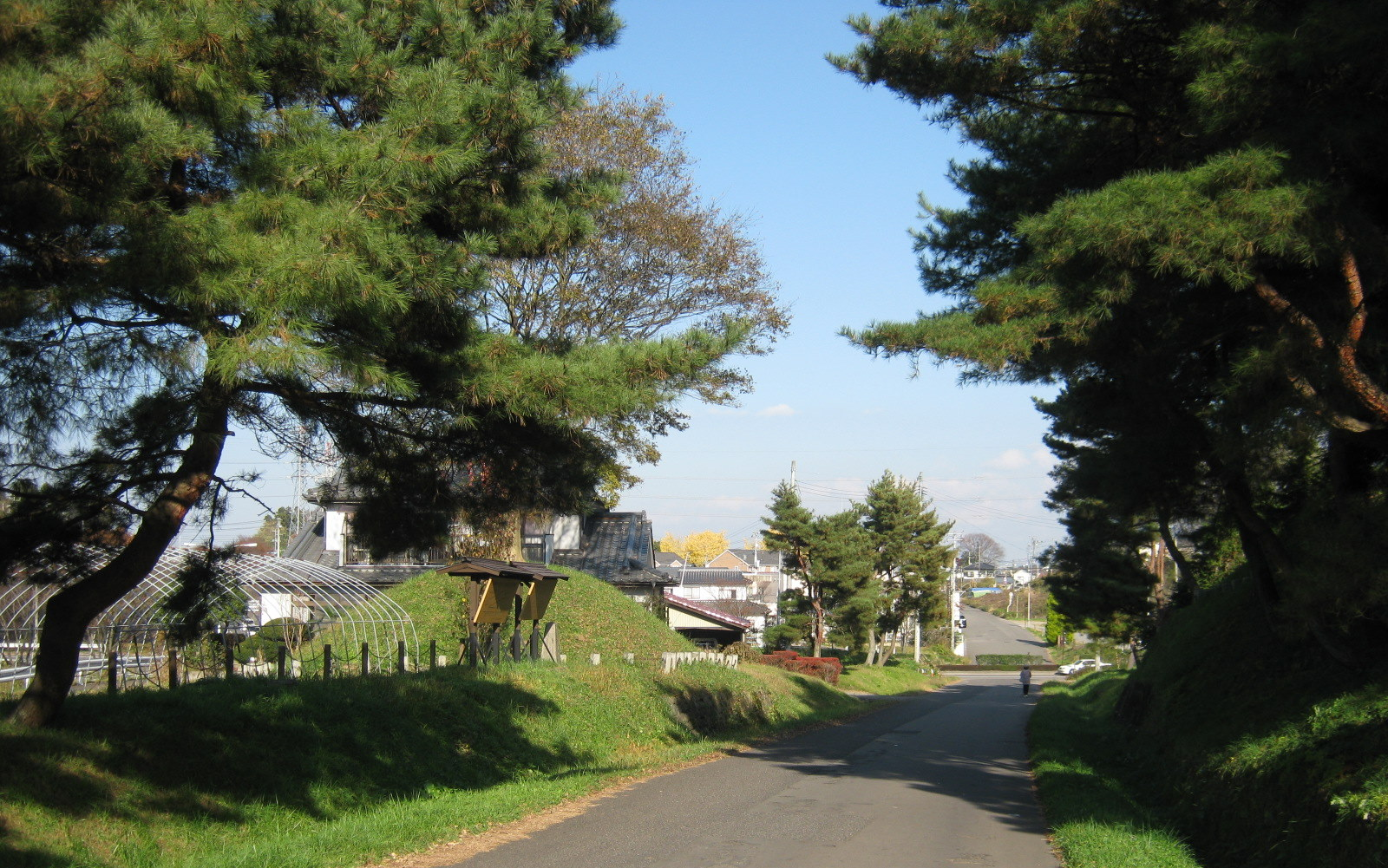
- Sukagawa Ichirizuka

- Sukagawa Ichirizuka Sukagawa Ichirizuka (Japan)
- 37°16′28″N 140°21′47″E
- Periods: Edo period
- Location: Sukagawa, Fukushima, Japan
- Region: Tōhoku region

Site notes
- Public access: Yes

The Sukagawa Ichirizuka (須賀川一里塚) is a historic Japanese distance marker akin to a milestone, comprising a pair of earthen mounds located in what is now part of the city of Sukagawa, Fukushima Prefecture in the Tōhoku region of Japan. It was designated a National Historic Site of Japan in 1936.

== Overview ==
During the Edo period Tokugawa shogunate established ichirizuka on major roads, enabling calculation both of distance travelled and of the charge for transportation by kago or palanquin. These mounds, denoted the distance in ri (3.927 kilometres (2.440 mi)) to Nihonbashi, the "Bridge of Japan", erected in Edo in 1603. They were typically planted with an enoki or Japanese red pine to provide shelter for travelers. Since the Meiji period, most of the ichirizuka have disappeared, having been destroyed by the elements, modern highway construction and urban encroachment. In 1876, the "Ichirizuka Abolition decree" was issued by the Meiji government and many were demolished at that time. Currently, 17 surviving ichirizuka are designated as national historic sites.

In the case of the Sukagawa ichirizuka, the mounds flank the Ōshū Kaidō, and were the 59th marker from Nihonbashi. The mounds are approximately three meters in height and four to five meters in diameter, with trees planted on the top. While the mounds were in good preservation, they were substantially repaired and enlarged in 1984.

The site is about 10 minutes by car from Sukagawa Station on the JR East Tōhoku Main Line.

== See also ==
- List of Historic Sites of Japan (Fukushima)
