= Mizuno Senko =

Japanese writer

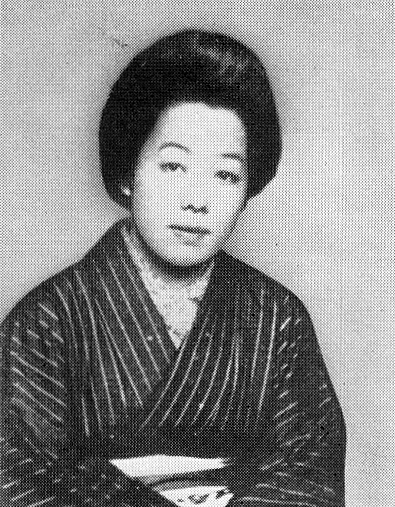
- Senko Mizuno
- Born: Hattori Tei; 3 December 1888; Sukagawa City, Fukushima Prefecture, Japan
- Died: 31 May 1919 (aged 30); Kusatsu Onsen, Gunma Prefecture, Japan
- Other names: Hattori Suisen, Hattori Sadako, Mizuno Sen (pseudonyms)
- Occupation: Writer
- Spouse: Michizo Kawanami

Mizuno Senko (3 December 1888 – 31 May 1919) (水野仙子 in Japanese, or みずの せんこ in kana) was a Japanese writer, born Tei Hattori. In her short career, she was published as a novelist, story writer, essayist, and journalist.

== Early life ==
Senko was born in Sukugawa, Fukushima, one of the daughters of Naotaro Hattori. She graduated from high school in Sukugawa, and trained at Sukagawa Sewing College. She later studied with writer Tayama Katai in Tokyo.

== Career ==
Senko was a writer from her youth; she began publishing short essays in Joshi Bundan in 1905. She worked at Seitō (Bluestocking), a feminist literary magazine, and was a reporter for the Yomiuri Shimbun newspaper. Much of Senko's writing was on topics related to women's lives, relationships, bodies, and illness. For example, her short story "For More Than Forty Days" ("Shijūyonichi", 四十余日, 1910), centers on a pregnant rural woman. "Dignity of a Dog" ("Inu no igen", 犬の威嚴, 1914), another short story, features two women discussing marriage and their husbands' faults.

== Personal life ==
Senko married journalist Dosan Kawanami in 1911. She fell ill with liver disease and pleurisy in 1918, and died at Kusatsu Onsen, a hot springs resort in Gunma Prefecture, in 1919, at the age of 30. Her widower published a collection of her works in 1920.
