= Beizanji Sutra Mounds =

- 米山寺経塚群 (Japanese)
- Beizanji Sutra Mounds Beizanji Sutra Mounds (Japan)
- 37°18′01″N 140°21′47″E
- Periods: Heian period
- Location: Sukagawa, Fukushima, Japan
- Region: Tōhoku region

Site notes
- Excavation dates: 1976
- Discovered: 1884
- Public access: Yes (no public facilities)

The Beizanji Sutra Mounds (米山寺経塚群, Beizanji kyōzuka-gun) is a Kamakura period archaeological site located in what is now part of the city of Sukagawa, Fukushima Prefecture in the Tōhoku region of Japan. The site was designated a National Historic Site of Japan in 1937. and expanded in 1977.

== Overview ==
The Beizanji Sutra Mounds are located within the grounds of the Hie Jinja, a Shinto shrine located in the Nishikawa neighborhood located to the northwest of central Sukagawa. During a rebuilding of the main shrine building in 1884, a number of earthen mounds located to its rear were flattened, and were found to contain pottery cylinders and bronze Buddhist statues. A large number of Sue ware pottery shards and roof tiles were also unearthed. The mounds were determined to have been sutra mounds, which, from inscriptions on the artifacts, were made the Jōan era (1171-1174) for a temple called Beizan-ji, which once occupied this site. A total of ten mounds existed; however only Mound No.3 has been retained in almost its original shape. Excavations in 1976 determined the foundations for at least three buildings on the slopes of the hill at this site, with some indications of a surrounding stone wall and moat.

The site is located about 15 minutes on foot from Sukagawa Station on the JR East Tohoku Main Line.

== See also ==
- List of Historic Sites of Japan (Fukushima)
