= Kawabeoki Station =

Railway station in Tamakawa, Fukushima Prefecture, Japan

Kawabeoki Station 川辺沖駅
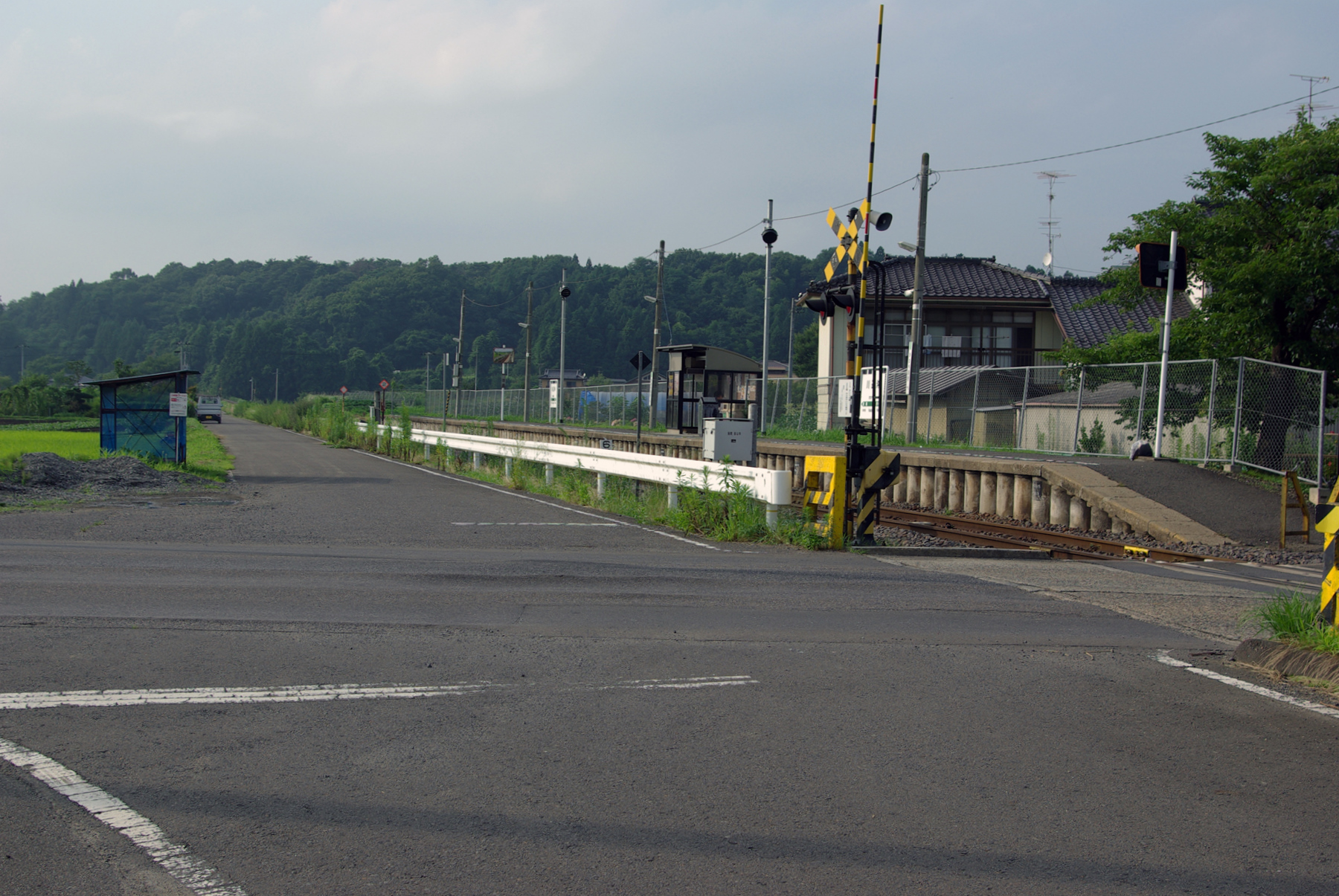
- Kawabeoki Station in July 2009

General information
- Location: Kawabe, Tamakawa, Ishikawa District, Fukushima Prefecture 963-6313; Japan
- Coordinates: 37.1929°N 140.4056°E
- Operator: JR East
- Line: ■ Suigun Line
- Distance: 112.6 km from Mito
- Platforms: 1 side platform
- Tracks: 1

Other information
- Status: Unstaffed
- Website: Official website

History
- Opened: June 1, 1959

Passengers
- FY2004: 47 daily

Services
Preceding station	JR East	Following station
Nogisawa towards Mito	Suigun Line	Izumigō towards Kōriyama
Location
- Location within Fukushima Prefecture Location within Japan

Kawabeoki Station (川辺沖駅, Kawabeoki-eki) is a railway station in the village of Tamakawa, Fukushima, Japan operated by East Japan Railway Company (JR East).

== Lines ==
Kawabeoki Station is served by the Suigun Line, and is located 112.6 rail kilometers from the official starting point of the line at Mito.

== Station layout ==
The station has one side platform serving a single bi-directional track. There is no station building, but only a waiting room on the platform. The station is unattended.

== History ==
Kawabeoki Station opened on June 1, 1959. The station was absorbed into the JR East network upon the privatization of the Japanese National Railways (JNR) on April 1, 1987.

== Surrounding area ==
- Abukuma River
- National Route 118

== See also ==
- List of railway stations in Japan
