= Naganuma, Fukushima =

Naganuma 長沼町
- Town
- Flag Seal

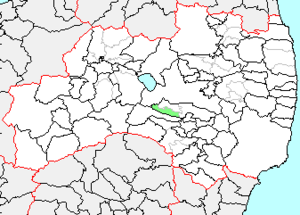
- Coordinates: 37°17′25″N 140°12′50″E
- Country: Japan
- Region: Tōhoku
- Prefecture: Fukushima
- District: Iwase

Area
  - Total: 60.34 km^{2} (23.30 sq mi)

Population (2003)
  - Total: 6,455
  - Density: 107.0/km^{2} (277.1/sq mi)
- Time zone: UTC+9 (Japan Standard Time)
- Tree: Cherry Blossom, pine
- Flower: Lilium auratum
- Bird: Common cuckoo
- Address: 85, Kanamachi, Nagnuma, Naganuma Town, Iwase district, Fukushima prefecture
- Website: Official website

Naganuma in Japan

Naganuma (長沼町, Naganuma-machi) was a town located in Iwase District, Fukushima Prefecture, Japan.

As of 2003, the town had an estimated population of 6,455 and a density of 106.98 persons per km^{2}. The total area was 60.34 km^{2}.

== History ==
The people lived in Naganuma, because of Jomon pottery(縄文土器)and Dugout(竪穴式住居)discovered from Tsukakoshi remains in 25th century BC.

Naganuma town built by Takatoki Naganuma in 1260 AD.

It is deserted castle by Decree of One Castle Per Province(一国一城令) in 1615 AD.

Old Naganuma was formed as a result of the enforcement of town organization in 1901 AD.

Old Naganuma town and Hokotsuki village merged Naganuma town in 1955 AD.

On April 1, 2005 AD, Naganuma, along with the village of Iwase (also from Iwase District), was merged into the expanded city of Sukagawa.

== Education ==
- Naganuma Kindergarten
- Naganuma Primary School
- Naganuma East Primary School
- Naganuma Junior High School
- Naganuma High School

== Industry ==
=== Tradition ===
From Edo era to Meiji era made Naganuma dyed paper(長沼染型紙).And from Meiji era to Taisho era made Naganuma ware(長沼焼).

== Local attractions ==
=== Tourist spot ===
- Naganuma Castle
- Fujinuma Lake National park
- Naganuma Folk Museum
- Naganuma Minami Kodate

=== Festival ===
- Naganuma Nebuta Festival

== Transportation ==
From Sukagawa station to Naganuma town (Yatano or Yokota) by bus in Sukagawa station stop 1 pole.

It take about one hour.

== See also ==
- Ten-ei
- Naganuma, Hokkaido
- Sukagawa, Fukushima
