= Yatagawa Station =

Railway station in Kōriyama, Fukushima Prefecture, Japan

Yatagawa Station 谷田川駅
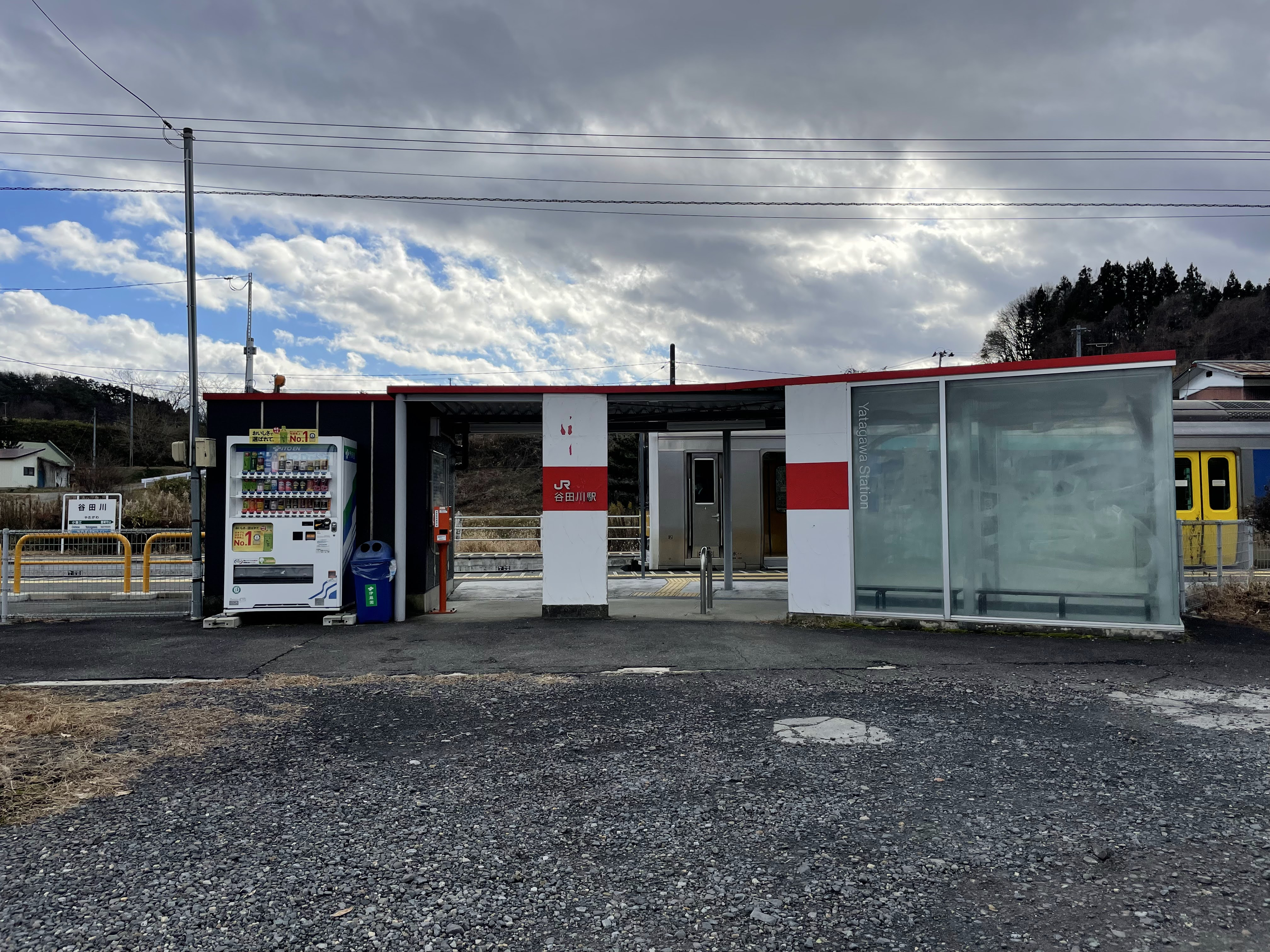
- Yatagawa Station in 20 December 2021

General information
- Location: Tamuramachi-Yatagawa Arakoji 1, Kōriyama-shi, Fukushima-ken 963-1246; Japan
- Coordinates: 37.3136°N 140.4312°E
- Operator: JR East
- Line: ■ Suigun Line
- Distance: 128.9 km from Mito
- Platforms: 2 side platforms
- Tracks: 2

Other information
- Status: Unstaffed
- Website: Official website

History
- Opened: May 10, 1929

Services
Preceding station	JR East	Following station
Oshioe towards Mito	Suigun Line	Iwaki-Moriyama towards Kōriyama
Location
- Location within Fukushima Prefecture Location within Japan

Yatagawa Station (谷田川駅, Yatagawa-eki) is a railway station in the city of Kōriyama, Fukushima, Japan operated by East Japan Railway Company (JR East).

== Lines ==
Yatagawa Station is served by the Suigun Line, and is located 128.9 rail kilometers from the official starting point of the line at Mito.

== Station layout ==
The station has two opposed unnumbered side platforms connected to the station building by a level crossing. The station is unattended.

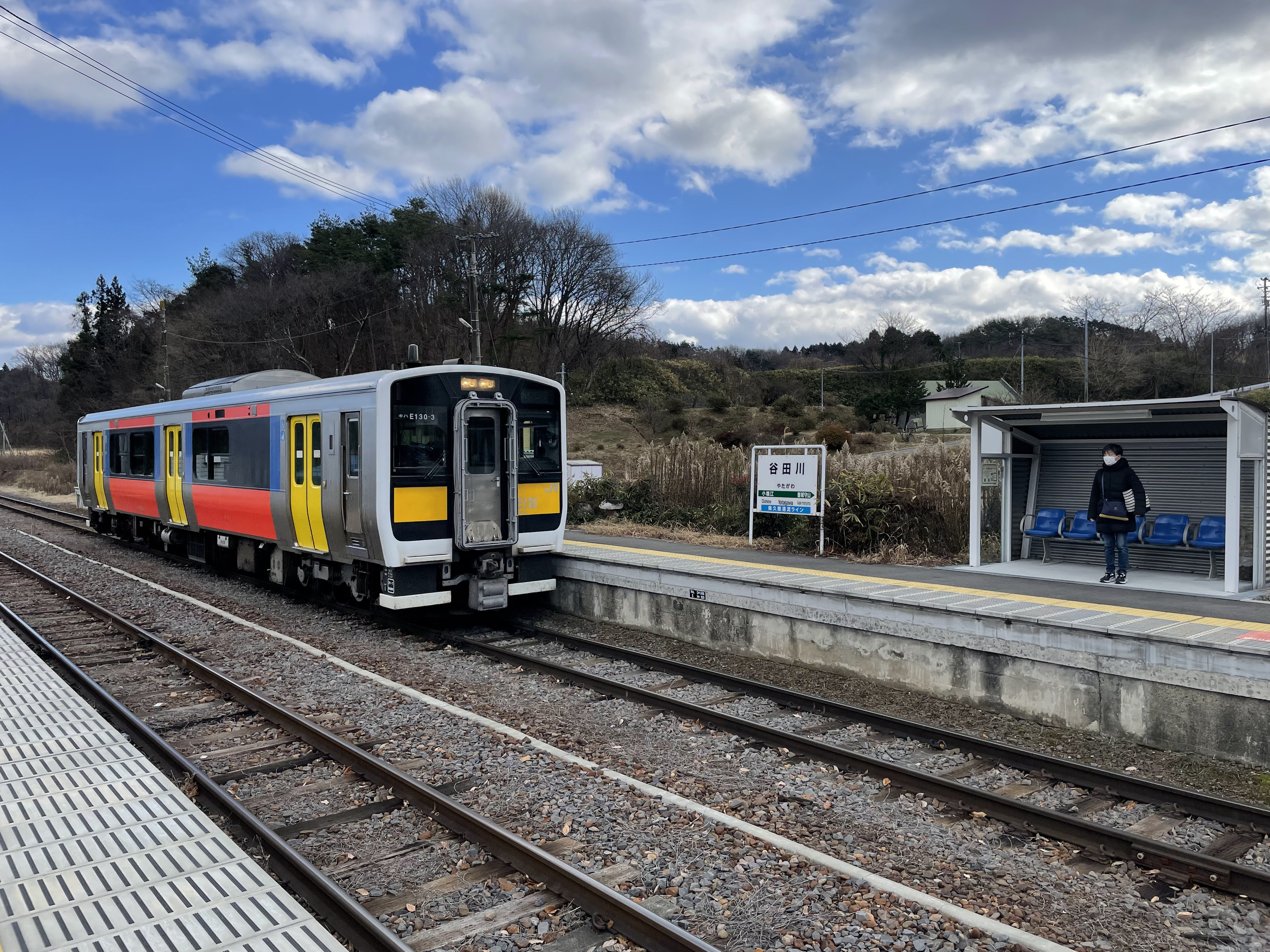
Platform and E130 series (December, 2021)

=== Platforms ===
station side	■ Suigun Line	for Mito
opposite side	■ Suigun Line	for Kōriyama

== History ==
Yatagawa Station opened on May 10, 1929. The station was absorbed into the JR East network upon the privatization of the Japanese National Railways (JNR) on April 1, 1987.

== Surrounding area ==
- National Route 49

== See also ==
- List of railway stations in Japan
