= Oshioe Station =

Railway station in Sukagawa, Fukushima Prefecture, Japan

Oshioe Station 小塩江駅
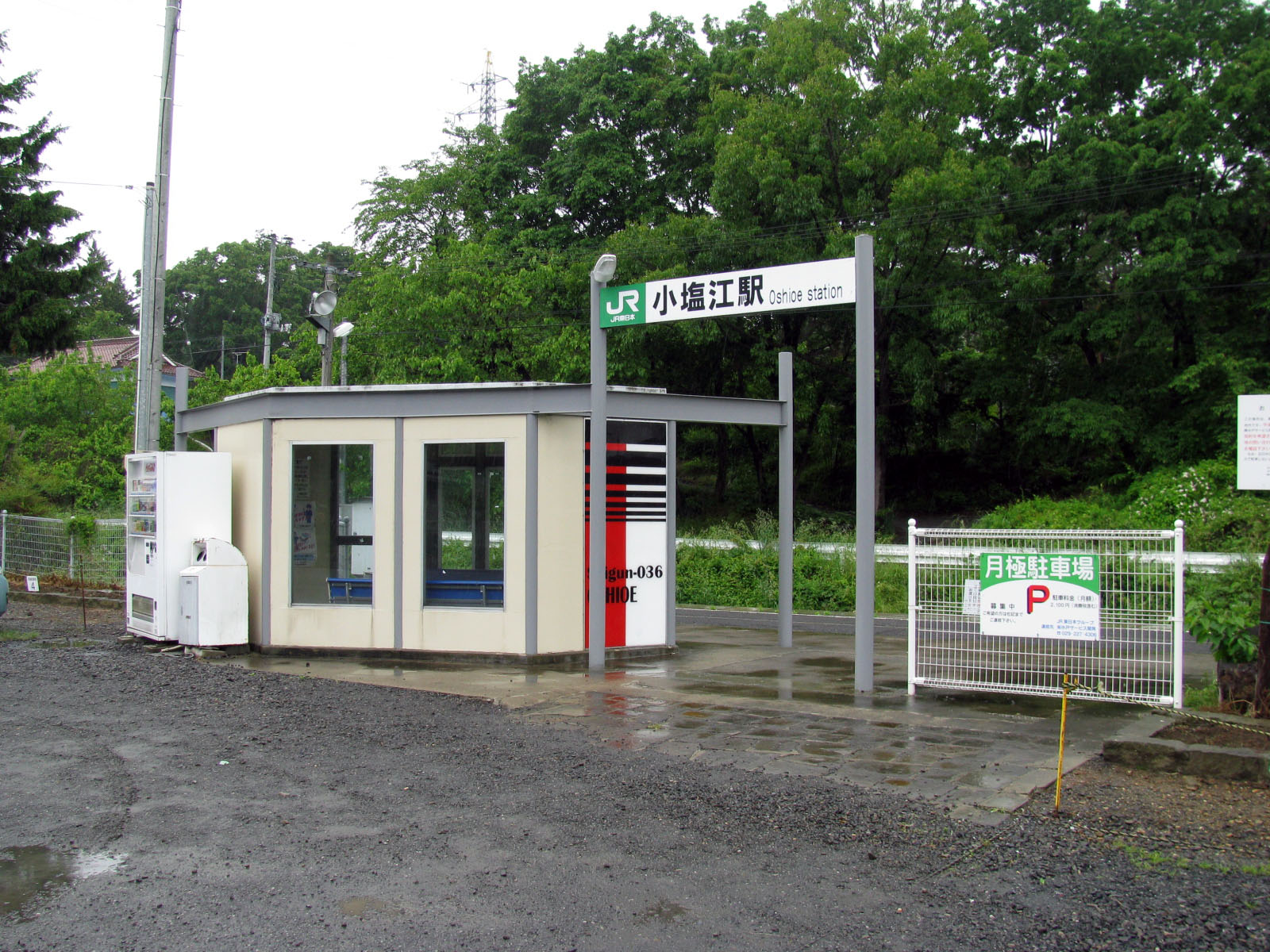
- Oshioe Station in June 2008

General information
- Location: 4 Kodama Oshioe, Sukagawa-shi, Fukushima-ken 962-0711; Japan
- Coordinates: 37.2956°N 140.4304°E
- Operator: JR East
- Line: ■ Suigun Line
- Distance: 126.0 km from Mito
- Platforms: 1 side platform
- Tracks: 1

Other information
- Status: Unstaffed
- Website: Official website

History
- Opened: May 1, 1952

Services
| Preceding station | JR East | Following station |
|---|---|---|
| Kawahigashi towards Mito | Suigun Line | Yatagawa towards Kōriyama |
Location
- Location within Fukushima Prefecture Location within Japan

Oshioe Station (小塩江駅, Oshioe-eki) is a railway station in the city of Sukagawa, Fukushima, Japan operated by East Japan Railway Company (JR East).

== Lines ==
Oshioe Station is served by the Suigun Line, and is located 126.0 rail kilometers from the official starting point of the line at Mito .

== Station layout ==
The station has one side platform serving a single bi-directional track. The station is unattended.

== History ==
Oshioe Station opened on May 1, 1952. The station was absorbed into the JR East network upon the privatization of the Japanese National Railways (JNR) on April 1, 1987.

== Surrounding area ==
- Oshioe Post Office

== See also ==
- List of railway stations in Japan
