= Izumigō Station =

Railway station in Tamakawa, Fukushima Prefecture, Japan

Izumigō Station 泉郷駅
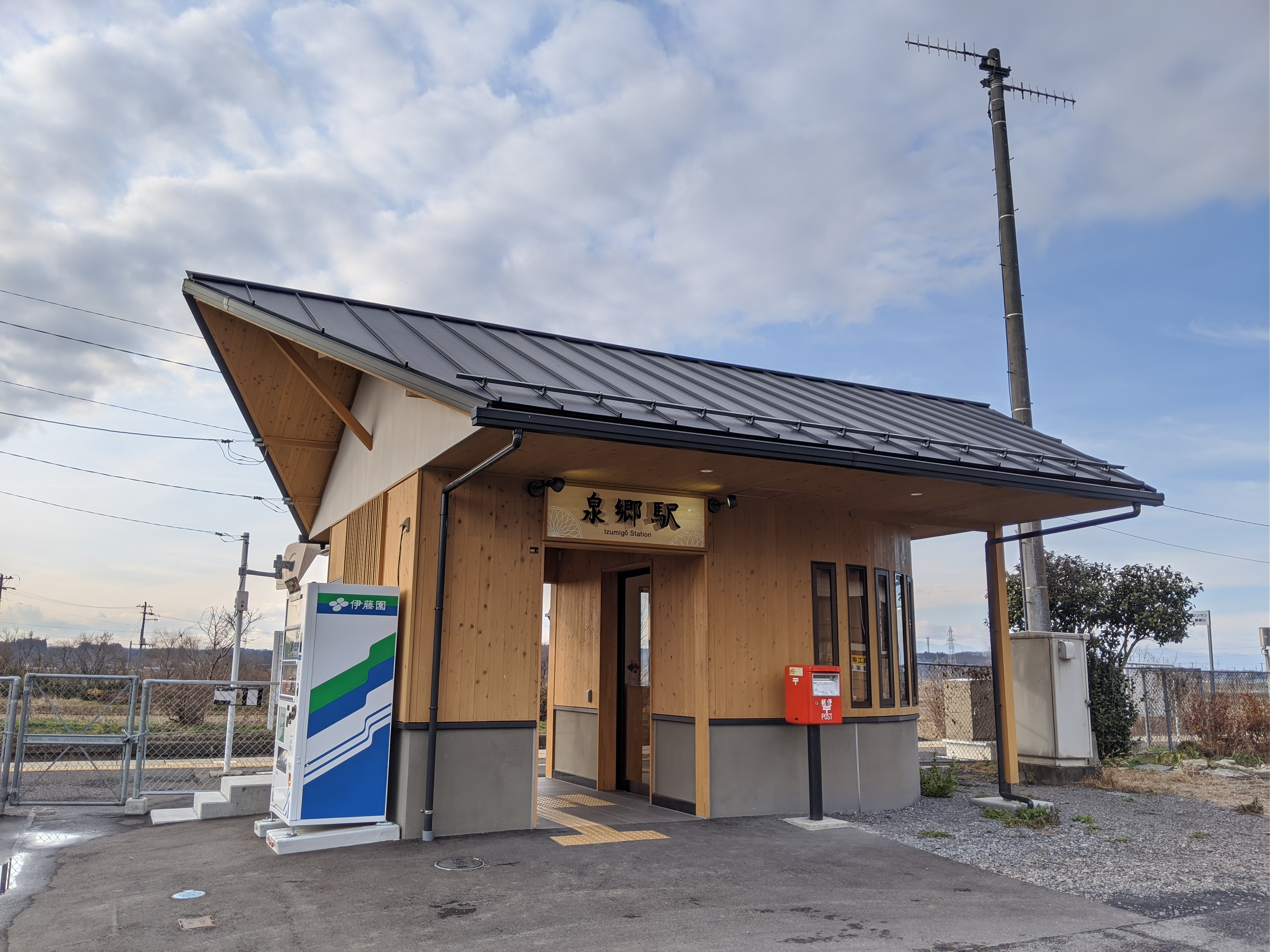
- Izumigō Station in Dec 2019

General information
- Location: Nakamuramae Odaka, Tamakawa, Ishikawa District, Fukushima Prefecture 963-6312; Japan
- Coordinates: 37.2146°N 140.4055°E
- Operator: JR East
- Line: ■ Suigun Line
- Distance: 115.3 km from Mito
- Platforms: 1 side platform
- Tracks: 1

Other information
- Status: Staffed
- Website: Official website

History
- Opened: December 4, 1934

Passengers
- FY2017: 116 daily

Services
Preceding station	JR East	Following station
Kawabeoki towards Mito	Suigun Line	Kawahigashi towards Kōriyama
Location
- Location within Fukushima Prefecture Location within Japan

Izumigō Station (泉郷駅, Izumigō-eki) is a railway station in the village of Tamakawa, Fukushima, Japan operated by East Japan Railway Company (JR East).

== Lines ==
Izumigō Station is served by the Suigun Line, and is located 115.3 rail kilometers from the official starting point of the line at Mito.

== Station layout ==
The station has one side platform serving a single bi-directional track. The station formerly had two opposed side platforms, but one of the platforms is no longer in use.

== History ==
Izumigō Station opened on December 4, 1934. The station was absorbed into the JR East network upon the privatization of the Japanese National Railways (JNR) on April 1, 1987.

== Passenger statistics ==
In fiscal 2017, the station was used by an average of 116 passengers daily (boarding passengers only).

== Surrounding area ==
- Tamagawa Village Hall
- Tamagawa Post Office
- Abukuma River
- National Route 118
- Fukushima Airport
  - The walk takes about 50 minutes from this station to the airport.

== See also ==
- List of railway stations in Japan
