= Sukagawa =

Sukagawa 須賀川市
- City
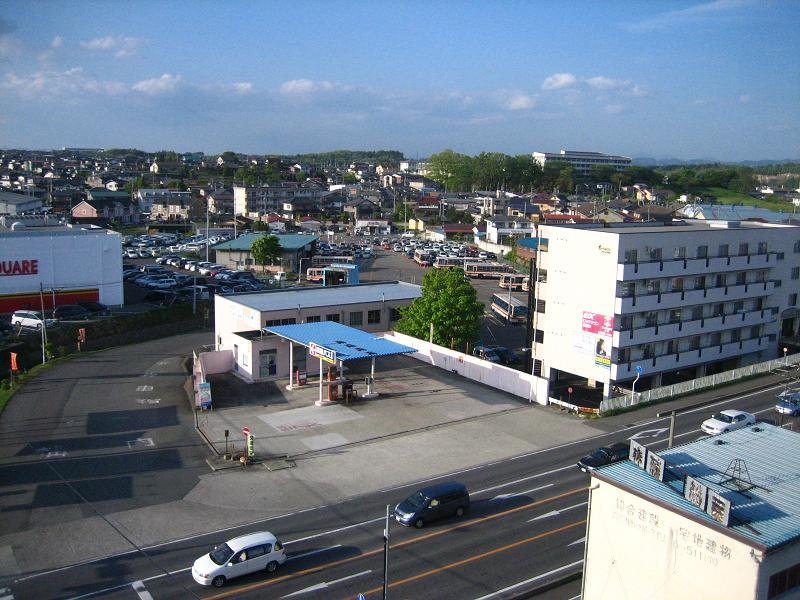
- Skyline of Sukagawa

- Flag Seal

- Location of Sukagawa in Fukushima Prefecture

- Coordinates: 37°17′11.3″N 140°22′21.6″E
- Country: Japan
- Region: Tōhoku
- Prefecture: Fukushima

Government
  - Mayor: Masaaki Ōdera

Area
  - Total: 279.43 km^{2} (107.89 sq mi)

Population (January 2020)
  - Total: 75,753
  - Density: 271.10/km^{2} (702.14/sq mi)
- Time zone: UTC+9 (Japan Standard Time)
- City symbols
  - Tree: Pinus densiflora
  - Flower: Peony
  - Bird: Common kingfisher
- Phone number: 0248-75-1111
- Address: 135 Hachimanmachi, Sukagawa-shi, Fukushima-ken 962-8601
- Website: Official website

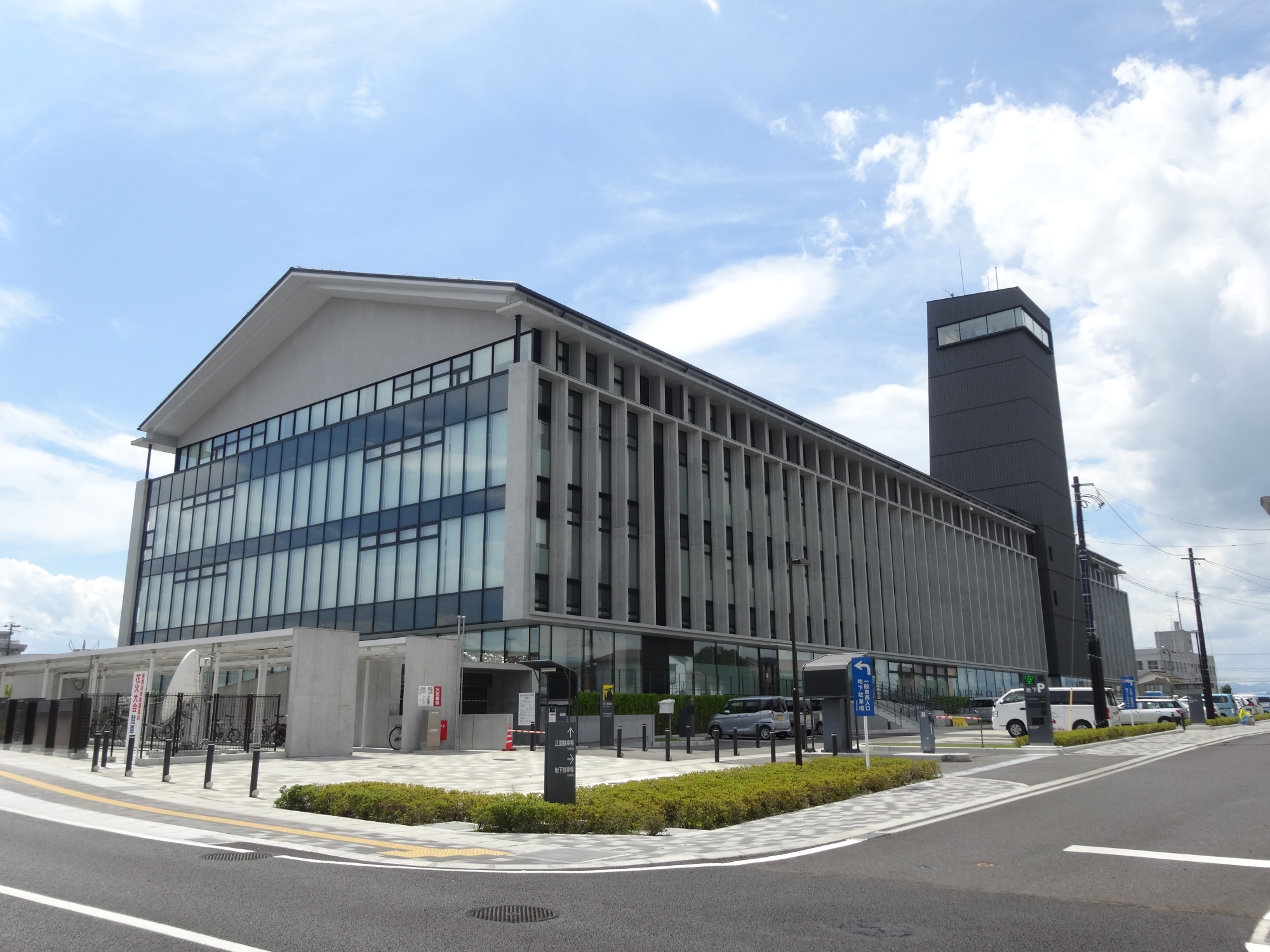
Sukagawa City Hall

Sukagawa (須賀川市, Sukagawa-shi) is a city located in Fukushima Prefecture, Japan. As of 1 May 2018, the city had an estimated population of 76,251 in 38824 households, and a population density of 270 persons per km^{2}. The total area of the city was 279.43 square kilometres (107.9 sq mi).

== History ==
The area of present-day Sukagawa was part of ancient Mutsu Province. Remains from the Japanese Paleolithic through the Nara period and Heian period indicate continuous settlement of the area for many centuries. Sukagawa developed as a castle town of the Nikaido clan during the Kamakura period. The castle was destroyed by Date Masamune after his aunt Onamihime surrendered the castle during the Sengoku period. During the Edo period the area prospered from its location as a major lodging place on Ōshū Kaidō, which is one of the Edo Five Routes, and was the commercial center in the region. The area was mostly administered as an exclave of Takada Domain under the Tokugawa Shogunate. After the Meiji restoration, it was organized as part of the Nakadōri region of Iwaki Province.

The village of Sukagawa was formed on April 1, 1889 with the creation of the modern municipalities system. However, after mid-Meiji period, the municipality was eclipsed by Kōriyama, which had succeeded in inviting the junction of West Ban'etsu Line with the Tōhoku Main Line train routes. On March 31, 1954, Sukagawa was elevated to city status after merging with the town of Hamada and villages of Nishibukuro and Inada (all from Iwase District), and the village of Oshioe (from Ishikawa District). Later, Sukagawa absorbed Niida Village (from Iwase District) on March 10, 1955, and then absorbed Ohigashi Village (from Ishikawa District) on February 1, 1967. On April 1, 2005, Sukagawa absorbed the town of Naganuma and village Iwase (both from Iwase District).

After the earthquake of 2011, the Fujinuma Dam collapsed resulting in seven fatalities. See also Radiation effects from Fukushima I nuclear accidents.

== Geography ==
Sukagawa is located in central Fukushima prefecture.

- Rivers: Abukuma River, Shakadogawa
- Mountains: Uzumine (676.9m)

=== Neighboring municipalities ===
- Fukushima Prefecture
  - Hirata
  - Kagamiishi
  - Kōriyama
  - Tamakawa
  - Ten'ei

== Climate ==
Sukagawa has a humid climate (Köppen climate classification Cfa). The average annual temperature in Sukagawa is 11.8 °C (53.2 °F). The average annual rainfall is 1,261 mm (49.6 in) with September as the wettest month. The temperatures are highest on average in August, at around 24.6 °C (76.3 °F), and lowest in January, at around 0.1 °C (32.2 °F).

== Demographics ==
Per Japanese census data, the population of Sukagawa peaked around the year 2000 and has declined slightly since then.

Historical population
| Year | Pop. | ±% |
|---|---|---|
| 1920 | 45,838 | — |
| 1930 | 52,045 | +13.5% |
| 1940 | 54,077 | +3.9% |
| 1950 | 71,947 | +33.0% |
| 1960 | 69,768 | −3.0% |
| 1970 | 66,552 | −4.6% |
| 1980 | 69,553 | +4.5% |
| 1990 | 73,107 | +5.1% |
| 2000 | 79,409 | +8.6% |
| 2010 | 79,279 | −0.2% |
| 2020 | 75,753 | −4.4% |

== Economy ==
Sukagawa has a mixed economy, and is a major commercial center for the surrounding region.

== Government ==
Sulagawa has a mayor-council form of government with a directly elected mayor and a unicameral city legislature of 23 members. Tamura, together with Tamura District contributes three members to the Fukushima Prefectural Assembly. In terms of national politics, the city is part of Fukushima 3rd district of the lower house of the Diet of Japan.

== Education ==
Sukagawa has 17 public elementary schools and ten public junior high schools operated by the city government. The city has five public high schools operated by the Fukushima Prefectural Board of Education.

== Transportation ==
=== Railway ===
JR East – Tōhoku Main Line

- Sukagawa

JR East – Suigun Line

- Kawahigashi - Oshioe

=== Highway ===
- Tōhoku Expressway – Sukagawa Interchange
- National Route 4
- National Route 118
- National Route 294

=== Airports ===
Fukushima Airport is located on the border of Sukagawa City and Tamagawa Village. It is notable for an array of Ultraman displays in honor of franchise creator Eiji Tsuburaya, whose hometown was Sukagawa. The airport houses the first Ultraman store in the Tohoku region.

== Local attractions ==
- Beizanji Sutra Mounds
- Fujinuma Dam
- Sukagawa Ichirizuka
- Sukagawa Peony Garden
- Shōnindan temple ruins
- Taimatsu Akashi Festival
- Uzumine

== International relations ==
- Luoyang, China, friendship city since August 1983

== Notable people from Sukagawa ==
- Dean Fujioka, Musician, actor
- Mizuno Senko (1888–1919), writer
- Nakaba Suzuki, Manga artist
- Eiji Tsuburaya, special effects director and creator of Ultraman
- Kōkichi Tsuburaya, Olympic marathon runner
- Sachiko Eto (1947-2012), cult leader and serial killer
