= Fukushima Airport =

Fukushima Airport 福島空港
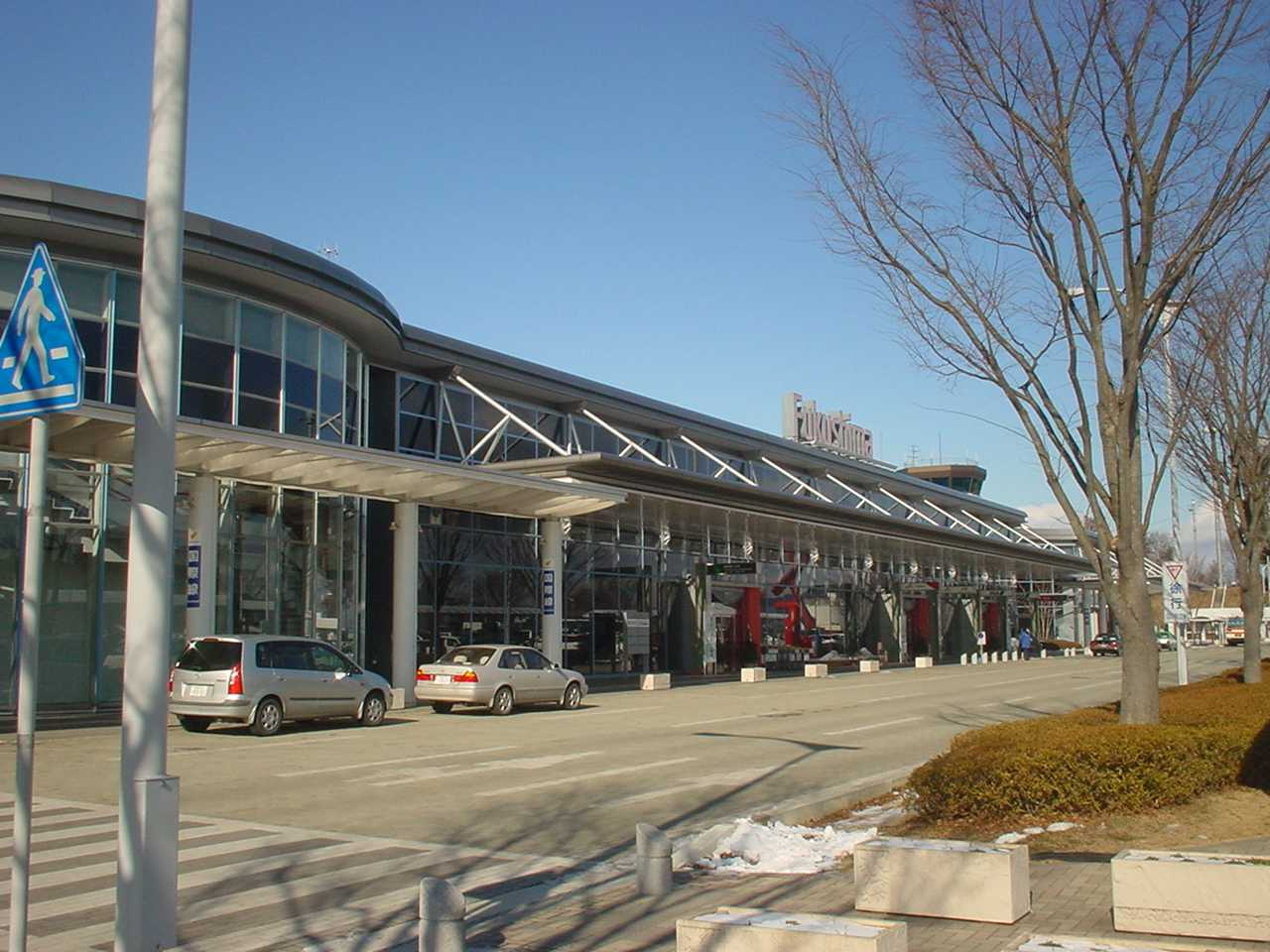
- IATA: FKS; ICAO: RJSF

Summary
- Airport type: Civil
- Operator: Government
- Serves: Sukagawa, Fukushima, Japan
- Elevation AMSL: 372 m (1,220 ft)
- Coordinates: 37°13′39″N 140°25′41″E
- Website: Official website

Map
- Location in Japan FKS/RJSF (Japan)

Runways
Direction	Length		Surface
Direction	m	ft	Surface
01/19	2,500	8,202	Asphalt/concrete

Statistics (2015)
- Passengers: 250,535
- Cargo (metric tonnes): 52
- Aircraft movement: 7,625
- Source: Japanese Ministry of Land, Infrastructure, Transport and Tourism

Fukushima Airport (福島空港, Fukushima Kūkō) (IATA: FKS, ICAO: RJSF) is an airport in Sukagawa, Fukushima Prefecture, Japan. The airport is located 19.4 km (12.1 mi) southeast of Kōriyama Station. It has served as the regional airport hub since its opening in 1993, the closest alternative being Sendai International Airport. Fukushima Airport is also a popular tourist destination for fans of the tokusatsu franchise, Ultraman. Ultraman creator Eiji Tsuburaya was born and raised in Sukagawa City, which is commemorated by an array of Ultraman displays on the grounds of the airport, as well as the first Ultraman store within the Tōhoku region.

== History ==
Fukushima Airport was conceived in the late 1970s, and planning at the prefectural level began in 1981. Construction occurred between 1988 and 1991, and the airport opened on March 20, 1993. The international terminal was opened in 1999.

The airport remained operational during and following the 2011 Tōhoku earthquake and Fukushima Daiichi nuclear disaster in March 2011, and temporarily saw increased domestic service during the closure of the Tōhoku Shinkansen high-speed rail line to Tokyo. The disasters caused minor damage to the airport itself but led to the suspension of scheduled international service by Asiana Airlines (to Seoul) and China Eastern Airlines (to Shanghai).

In November 2011, the airport terminal operator filed a claim against Tokyo Electric Power for 48 million yen in lost profits from the lost international service. As of June 2013 Asiana is considering resumption of scheduled service to Seoul due to the resurgent popularity of charter services with both Japanese and Korean tourists, but the Shanghai service appears much less likely to resume in the foreseeable future.

== Airlines and destinations ==
Airlines	Destinations
ANA Wings	Osaka–Itami, Sapporo–Chitose
Ibex Airlines	Osaka–Itami
Tigerair Taiwan	Taipei–Taoyuan

== Land traffic ==
- Limousine bus

=== Route and highway buses ===
No	Via	Destination	Company	Notes
Airport bus	Kōriyama-Chuō-Kōgyō-Danchi	Kōriyama Station	Fukushima kōtsū	There is a connecting discount to Aizu-Wakamatsu Station via Kōriyama Station (Aizu bus).
Airport bus	Nonstop	Iwaki Station	Shin-Joban-Kōtsū	Suspension of the service

=== Reservation system buses ===
Destination	Company
Aizu-Wakamatsu Station・Inawashiro Station・Iimori Hill・Higashiyama Onsen	Aizu taxi

=== Train ===
Station	Line	time
Izumigo Station	Suigun Line	60 minutes on foot

== In popular culture ==
The last episode of the TV drama Crying Out Love, In the Center of the World was filmed at Fukushima Airport in 2004.
