= Kuji River (Ibaraki) =

Kuji River 久慈川
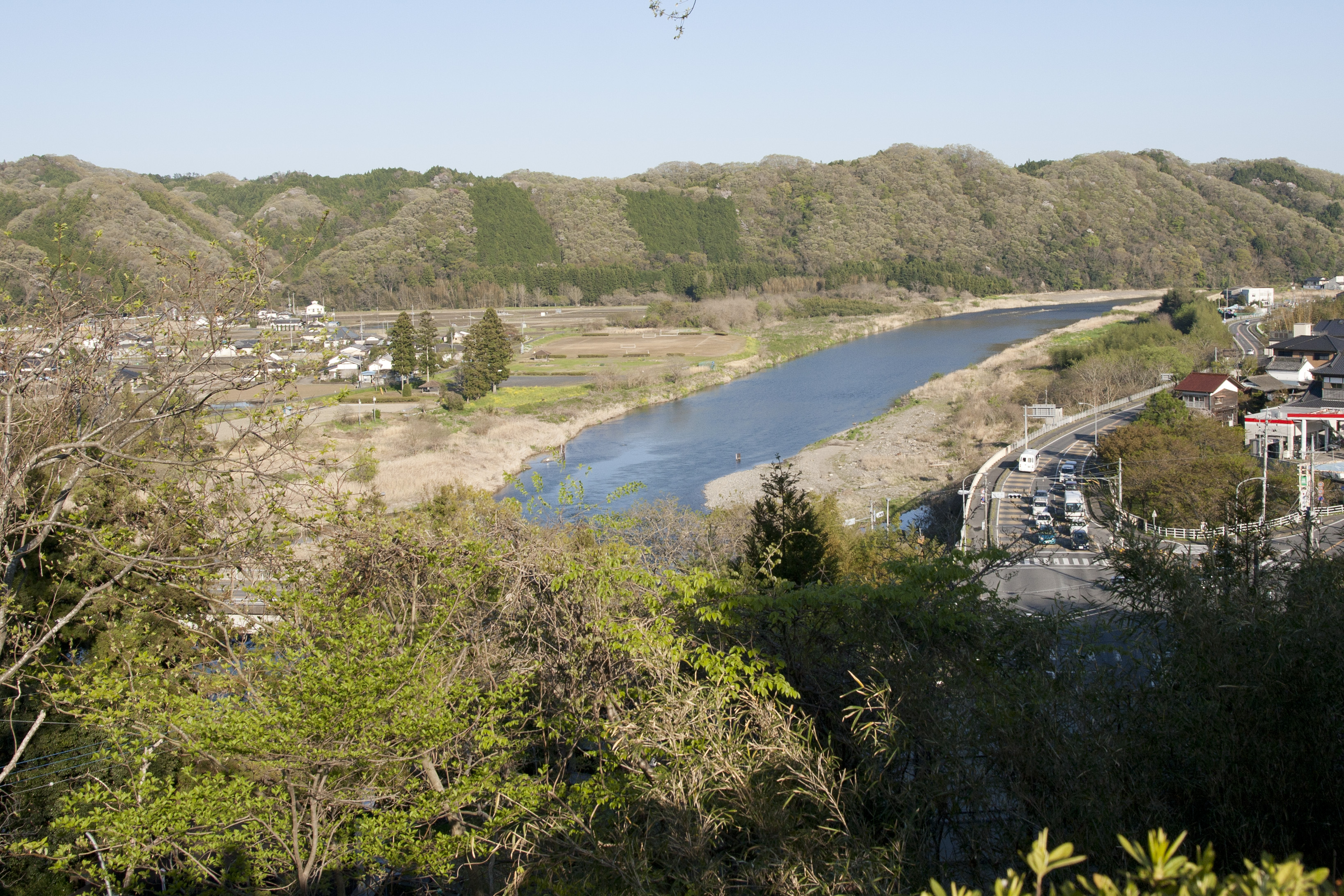
- Kuji River in Hitachiomiya (April 2017)

- Location within Japan

Location
- Country: Japan
- State: Honshu
- Region: Fukushima, Tochigi, Ibaraki

Physical characteristics
- Source: Mount Yamizo
  - elevation: 1,022 m (3,353 ft)
- Mouth: Pacific Ocean (at Hitachi and Tokai)
  - coordinates: 36°28′54″N 140°36′58″E
- Length: 124 km (77 mi)
- Basin size: 1,490 km^{2} (580 sq mi)
- Discharge
  - location: Sakakibashi (榊橋)
  - average: 27.1 (Note: The average discharge of calm water from 1989 to 1998.) m^{3}/s (960 cu ft/s)

Kuji River (Japanese: 久慈川(くじがわ), Hepburn: Kuji-gawa) is a river in Fukushima Prefecture, Tochigi Prefecture and Ibaraki Prefecture, Japan. It rises at the northern slope of Mount Yamizo, where the border of these three prefectures is located, and flows into Pacific Ocean at Hitachi and Tokai in Ibaraki Prefecture. It has a length of 124 kilometers (77 mi) and a drainage area of 1,490 square kilometers (580 sq mi), and is designated as a Class A river.

== History ==
The name Kuji is thought to be derived from the phonetically similar word for whale (kujira in Japanese). Hitachi no kuni fudoki, one of the existent fudoki, states: "There were a hill that resembled a whale [kujira]. Then the emperor named the land Kuji." The river is known for ayu fishing. In 2006 it had the second largest catch of ayu in Japan after the Naka River, which is also located in Ibaraki Prefecture. A fishing weir (梁 yana) for tourists is installed along the river in Daigo. Fukuroda Falls are located on the Taki River (滝川 Takigawa), which is one of its tributary rivers. One midwinter phenomenon is called shiga, in which frazil ice that is formed at the bottom floats to the surface. Distribution of freshwater fish like salvelinus and masu salmon captured in Fukushima Prefecture was restricted after the Fukushima Daiichi nuclear disaster in 2011, though restrictions on Kuji River fish has been gradually removed.

== Geography ==
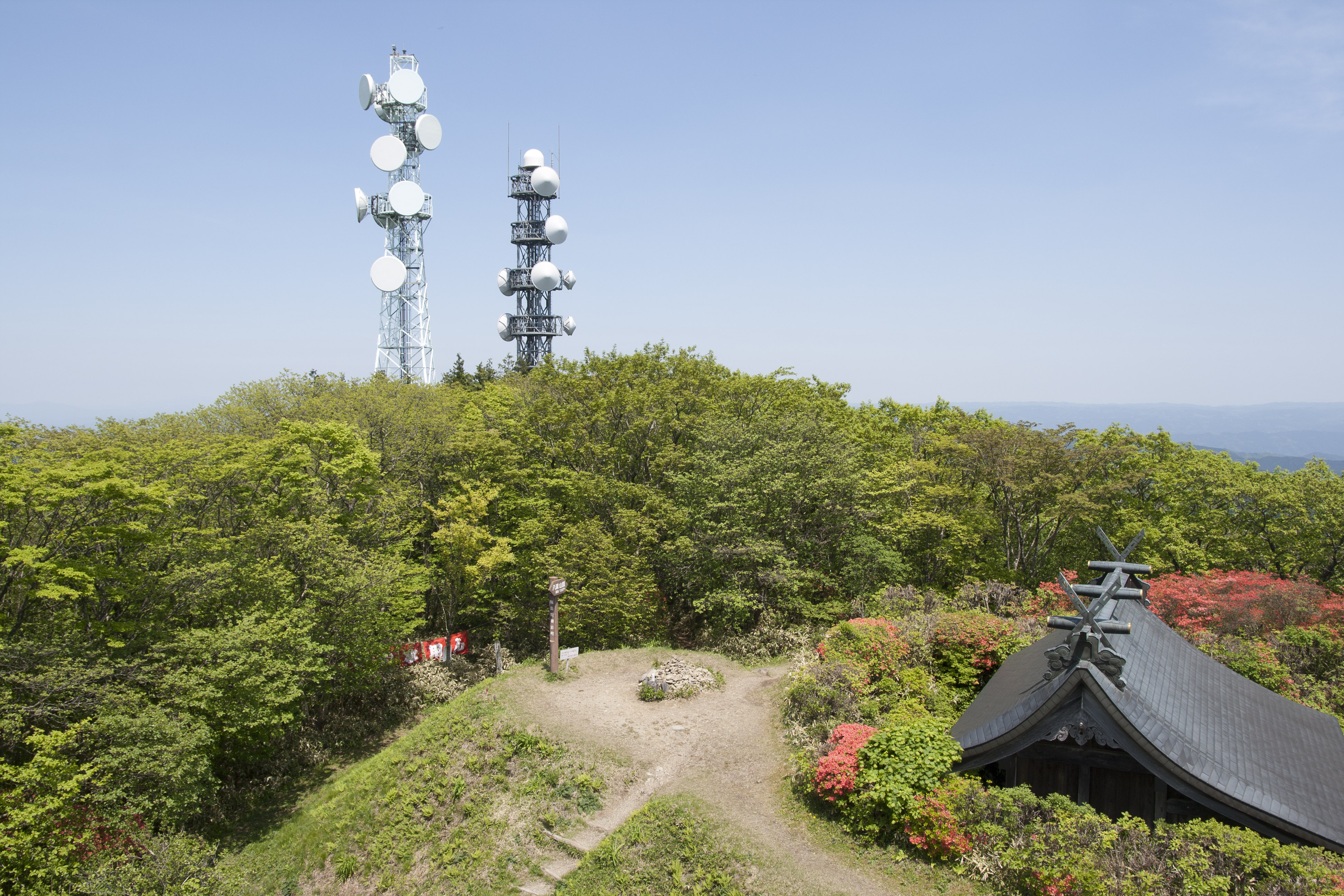
Summit of Mt. Yamizo (May 2016)

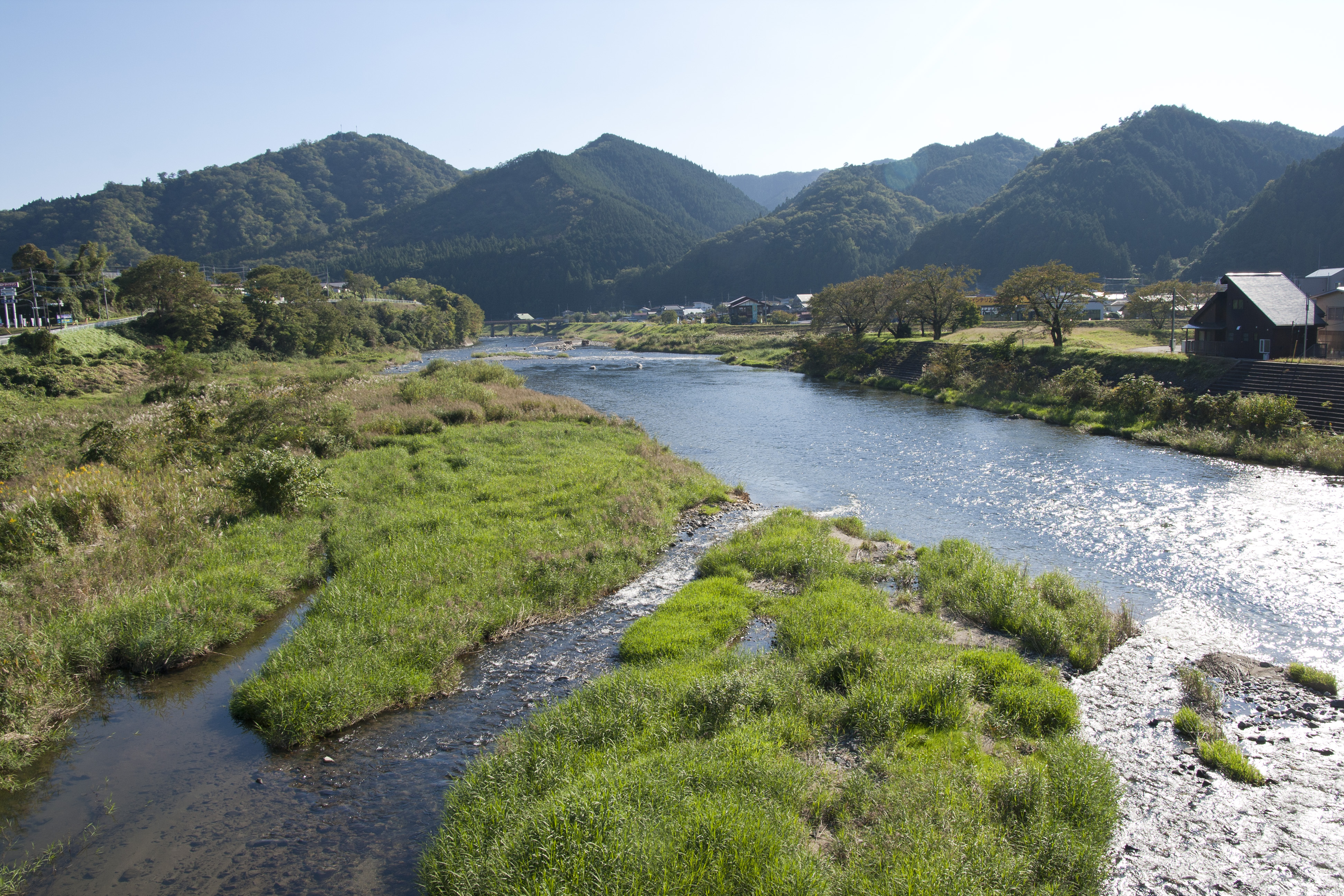
Kuji River in Daigo (October 2016)

Kuji River originates from the northern slope of Mount Yamizo, where the border of Fukushima Prefecture, Tochigi Prefecture and Ibaraki Prefecture is located. It initially flows to the northeast in Tanagura, Fukushima and then changes the flow direction to the sounth in the town. The dividing ridges of Abukuma River and Kuji River are relatively low, and it is considered that Kuji River captured the course of Abukuma River in the past. It flows along a narrow plain between Yamizo Mountains and Abukuma Mountains and into Ibaraki Prefecture. In Ibaraki Prefecture it flows through Daigo, Hitachiomiya and flows finally into Pacific Ocean at the border of Hitachi and Tokai. While the mainstream of the river flows through Fukushima Prefecture and Ibaraki Prefecture, some tributaries flow through Otawara in Tochigi Prefecture (former Kurobane), which is located in the southwest of Mt.Yamizo.

The approximately 80% of the basin consists of mountains and hills, and the rest consists of plateaus and plains. In the downstream basin there is Naka Plateau (那珂台地) between Naka River and Kuji River, which is a fluvial terrace formed by the erosion and deposition by the two rivers.

=== Major tributaries ===
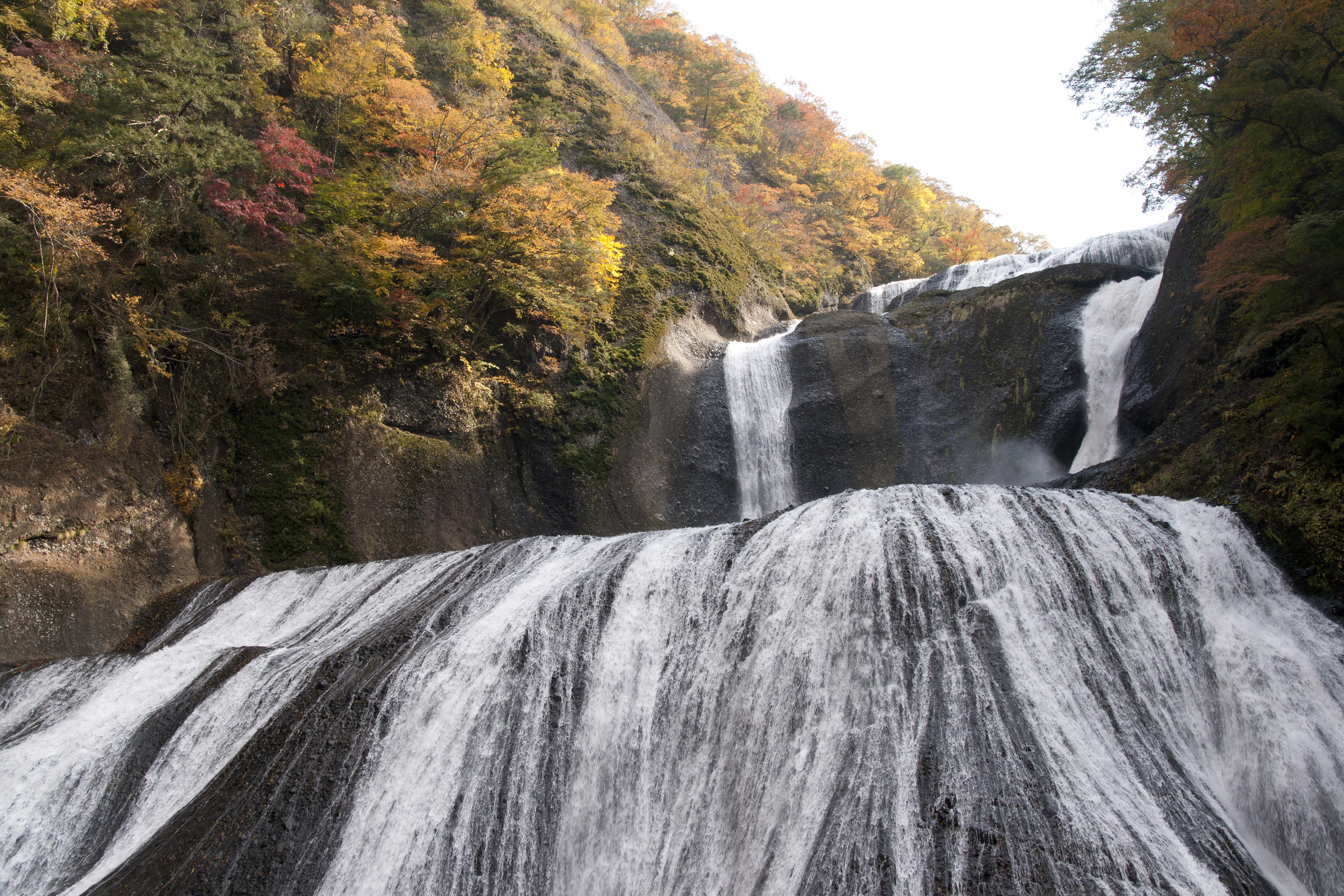
Fukuroda Falls (November 2017)

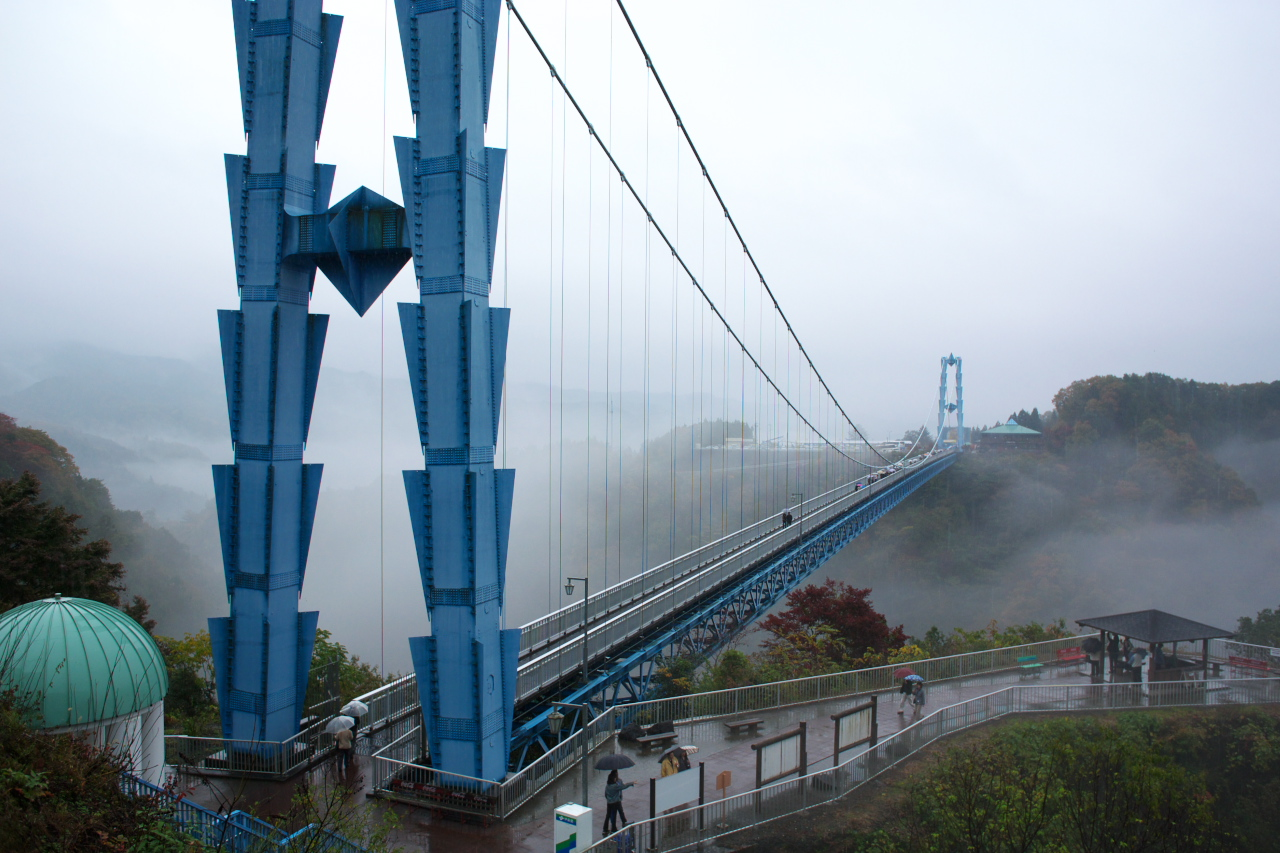
Ryujin Big Suspension Bridge (November 2011)

- Yamizo River (八溝川)

Yamizo River originates from the southern slope of Mt. Yamizo in Daigo, Ibaraki. It is 20.8 kilometers (12.9 mi) long. The natural springs of Yamizo River (八溝川湧水群 Yamizogawa Yūsuigun) are located at the source of the river. It is one of the Selected 100 Exquisite and Well Conserved Waters of Japan, which were designated by Ministry of the Environment in 1985.

- Oshi River (押川)

It is 27.4 kilometers in length and flows into Kuji River.

- Taki River (滝川)

Taki River rises at Namase Basin (生瀬盆地) and flows to the west. It is 12 kilometers (7.5 mi) in length. Namase Falls and Fukuroda Falls are located alongside the river. Fukuroda Falls are one of the three great waterfalls of Japan (日本三名瀑 Nihon-san-meibaku), the other two being Kegon Falls and Nachi Falls. Namase Falls and Fukuroda falls are designated as Places of Scenic Beauty.

- Tama River (玉川)

It is 20.0 kilometers (12.4 mi) in length and flows into Kuji River.

- Asa River (浅川)

It is 23.9 kilometers (14.9 mi) in length and flows into Kuji River.

- Yamada River (山田川)

It originates from Mount Nabeashi (鍋足山), flows through former Suifu, Kanasagō, Hitachiota, and into Kuji River. It is 37.8 kilometers (23.5 mi) in length.

- Ryūjin River (竜神川)

Its source is in Mount Nantai (男体山) located in the southeastern part of Daigo. It is 12.5 kilometers (7.8 mi) in length and flows into Yamada River at Takakura (高倉) in former Suifu Village. Ryujinkyo, a valley that was formed by the erosion, is situated alongside the river. On the lower valley Ryujin Dam is located and has the total capacity of 3,000,000 m^{3} (3,900,000 yd^{3}) and the height of 45 m (148 ft). Ryujin Big Suspension Bridge (竜神大吊橋 Ryujin Otsuribashi) links both sides of the valley, and is the longest suspension bridge for pedestrians in Honshu at 375 metres (1,230 ft).

- Sato River (里川)

It is 51.4 kilometers in length and flows into Kuji River.

=== Municipalities in the basin ===
In the basin there are five cities, five towns and two villages, which are listed below. As of 1995 the population of the basin is approximately 200,000.

- Hitachi, Hitachiota, Naka, Hitachiomiya, Daigo, Tokai (in Ibaraki Pref.)
- Asakawa, Tanagura, Hanawa, Yamatsuri, Samegawa (in Fukushima Pref.)
- Otawara (in Tochigi Pref.)
