= Shimonomiya Station =

Railway station in Daigo, Ibaraki Prefecture, Japan

Shimonomiya Station 下野宮駅
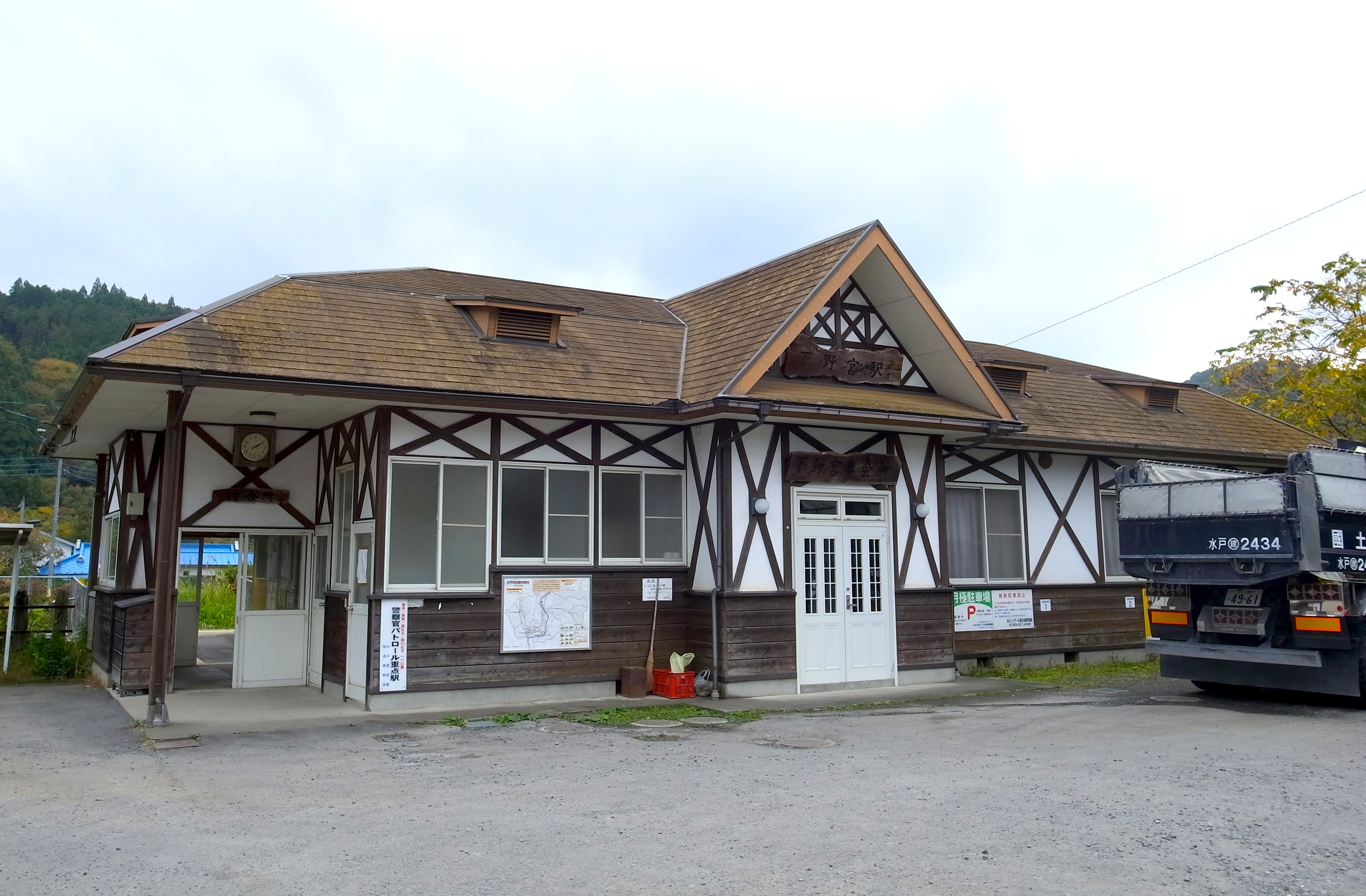
- Shimonomiya Station in October 2014

General information
- Location: Shimonomiya 2256, Daigo-machi, Kuji-gun, Ibaraki-ken 319-3555; Japan
- Coordinates: 36.8157°N 140.3753°E
- Operator: JR East
- Line: ■ Suigun Line
- Distance: 62.0 km from Mito
- Platforms: 1 side platform

Other information
- Status: Unstaffed
- Website: Official website

History
- Opened: April 16, 1930

Services
Preceding station	JR East	Following station
Hitachi-Daigo towards Mito	Suigun Line	Yamatsuriyama towards Kōriyama
Location
- Location within Ibaraki Prefecture Location within Japan

Shimonomiya Station (下野宮駅, Shimonomiya-eki) is a passenger railway station in the town of Daigo, Kuji District, Ibaraki Prefecture, operated by East Japan Railway Company (JR East).

== Lines ==
Shimonomiya Station is served by the Suigun Line, and is located 62.0 rail kilometers from the official starting point of the line at Mito Station.

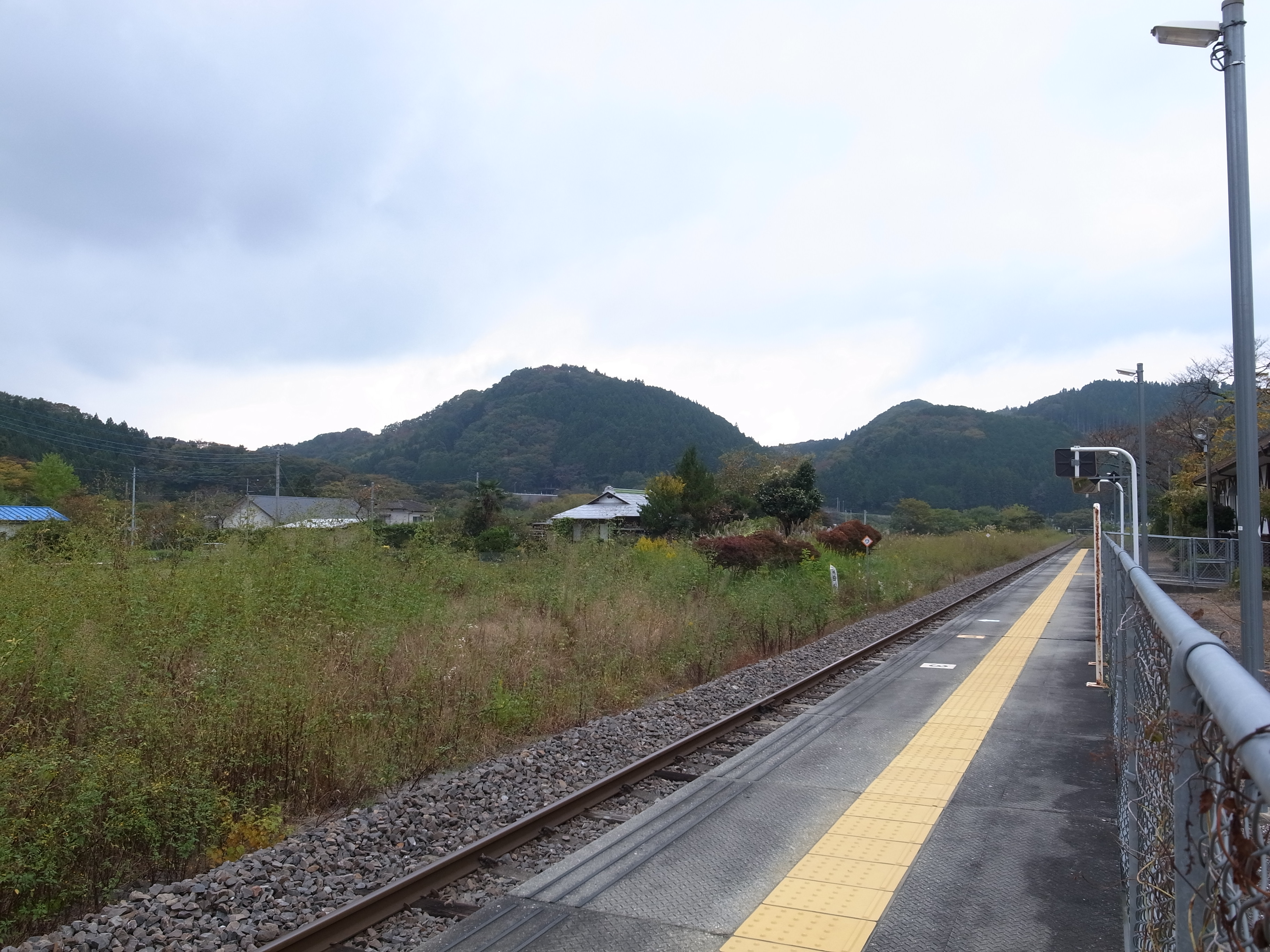
Station side platform, 2014

== Station layout ==
The station consists of a single side platform serving traffic in both directions. The station is unattended.

== History ==
Shimonomiya Station opened on April 16, 1930. The station was absorbed into the JR East network upon the privatization of the Japanese National Railways (JNR) on April 1, 1987.

== Surrounding area ==
- National Route 118
- Kujigawa River
- Shimonomiya Post Office
- Daigo Onsen
- Takachihara-iriguchi bus stop
  - Kamimyoga Line bound for Higashidate Station via Yamatsuriyama Station departs from the bus stop.

== Route buses ==
- Ibaraki Kotsu
  - For Jaketsu
  - For Karatake-Kubo
  - For Hitachi-Daigo Station

== See also ==
- List of railway stations in Japan
