= Minami-Ishii Station =

Railway station in Yamatsuri, Fukushima Prefecture, Japan

Minami-Ishii Station 南石井駅
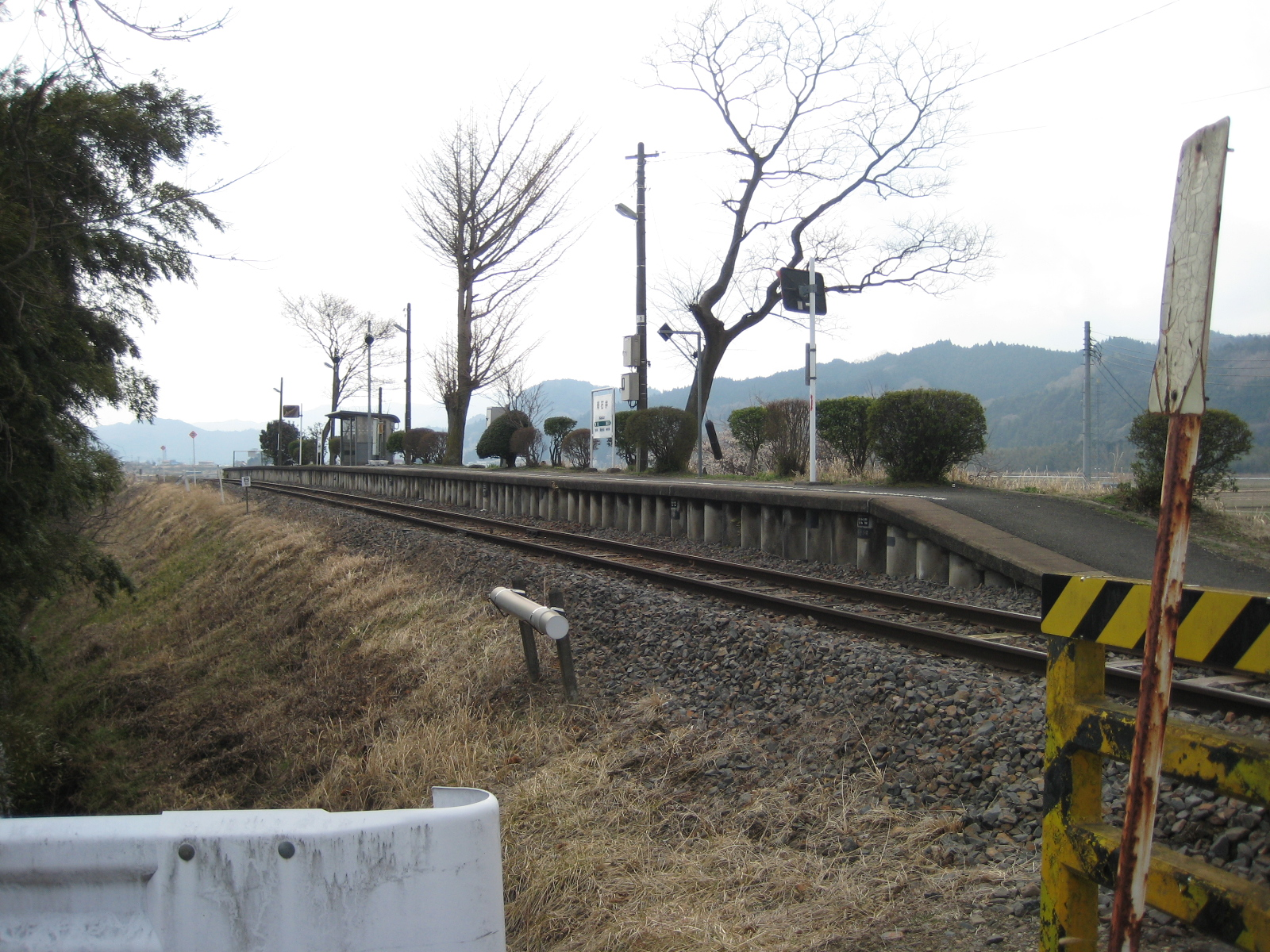
- Minami-Ishii Station in March 2008

General information
- Location: Shimoishii, Yamatsuri-machi, Higashishirakawa-gun, Fukushima-ken 963-5202; Japan
- Coordinates: 36.8947°N 140.4171°E
- Operator: JR East
- Line: ■ Suigun Line
- Distance: 73.8 km from Mito
- Platforms: 1 side platform
- Tracks: 1

Other information
- Status: Unstaffed
- Website: Official website

History
- Opened: August 1, 1957

Services
Preceding station	JR East	Following station
Higashidate towards Mito	Suigun Line	Iwaki-Ishii towards Kōriyama
Location
- Location within Fukushima Prefecture Location within Japan

Minami-Ishii Station (南石井駅, Minami-Ishii-eki) is a railway station in the town of Yamatsuri, Fukushima, Japan operated by East Japan Railway Company (JR East).

== Lines ==
Minami-Ishii Station is served by the Suigun Line, and is located 73.8 rail kilometers from the official starting point of the line at Mito.

== Station layout ==
The station has one side platform serving a single bi-directional track. There is no station building, but only a waiting shelter on the platform. The station is unattended.

== History ==
Minami-Ishii Station opened on August 1, 1957. The station was absorbed into the JR East network upon the privatization of the Japanese National Railways (JNR) on April 1, 1987.

== Surrounding area ==
- National Route 118
- Ishii Post Office

== See also ==
- List of railway stations in Japan
