= Yamatsuriyama Station =

Railway station in Yamatsuri, Fukushima Prefecture, Japan

Yamatsuriyama Station 矢祭山駅
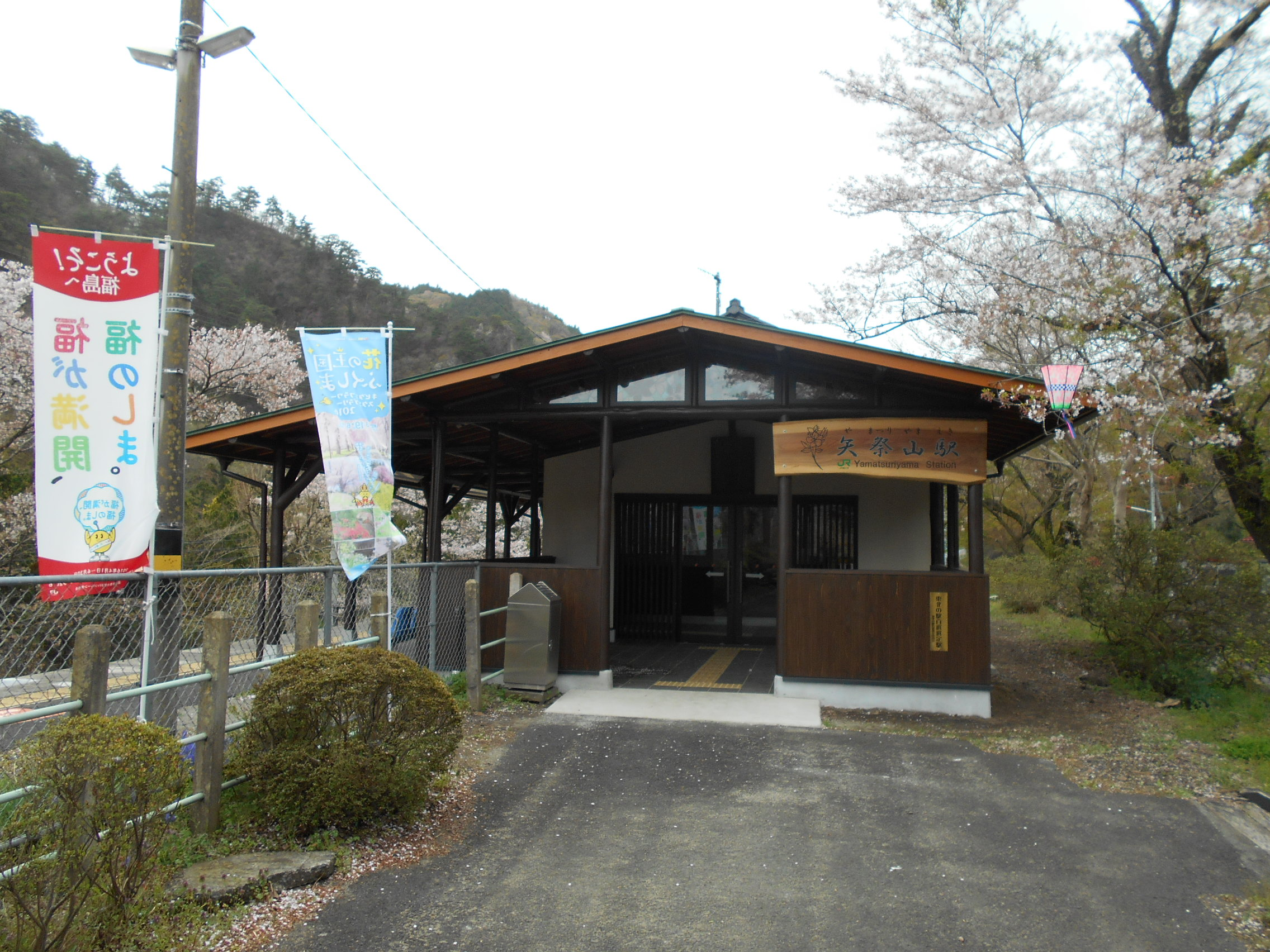
- Yamatsuriyama Station in April 2016

General information
- Location: Uchikawa Yamatsuri-machi, Higashishirakawa-gun, Fukushima-ken 963-5322; Japan
- Coordinates: 36.8499°N 140.3954°E
- Operator: JR East
- Line: ■ Suigun Line
- Distance: 66.9 km from Mito
- Platforms: 1 side platform
- Tracks: 1

Other information
- Status: Unstaffed
- Website: Official website

History
- Opened: November 15, 1939

Services
Preceding station	JR East	Following station
Shimonomiya towards Mito	Suigun Line	Higashidate towards Kōriyama
Location
- Location within Fukushima Prefecture Location within Japan

Yamatsuriyama Station (矢祭山駅, Yamatsuriyama-eki) is a railway station in the town of Yamatsuri, Fukushima, Japan, operated by East Japan Railway Company (JR East).

== Lines ==
Yamatsuriyama Station is served by the Suigun Line, and is located 66.9 kilometers from the official starting point of the line at Mito.

== Station layout ==
The station has one side platform serving a single bi-directional track. The station is unattended.

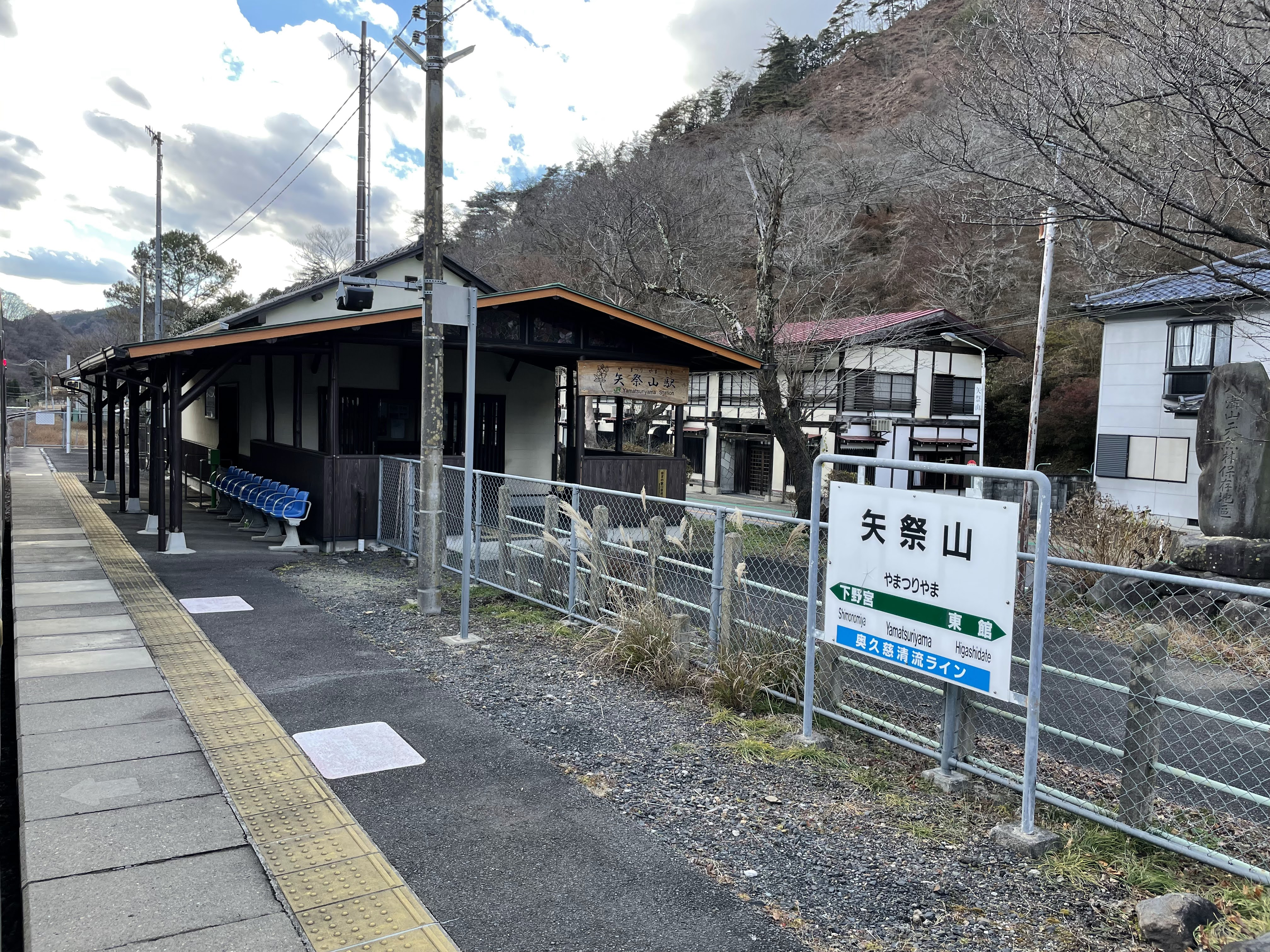
Station Platform and Name sign, December 2021

== History ==
Yamatsuriyama Station opened on March 27, 1937 as a temporary stop, and elevated to a full passenger station on November 15, 1939. The station was absorbed into the JR East network upon the privatization of the Japanese National Railways (JNR) on April 1, 1987.

== Surrounding area ==
- National Route 118
- Yamatsuri Jinja
- Yamatsuriyama

== See also ==
- List of railway stations in Japan
