= Satomi, Ibaraki =

Dissolved municipality in Ibaraki prefecture, Japan

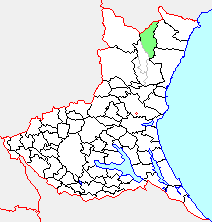
Map of Satomi, Ibaraki

Satomi (里美村, Satomi-mura) was a village located in Kuji District, Ibaraki Prefecture, Japan.

As of 2003, the village had an estimated population of 4,229 and a density of 35.26 persons per km^{2}. The total area was 119.95 km^{2}.

On December 1, 2004, Satomi, along with the town of Kanasagō, and the village of Suifu (all from Kuji District), was merged into the expanded city of Hitachiōta and no longer exists as an independent municipality.
