= Mount Yamizo =

Mountain between Fukushima and Ibaraki Prefectures, Japan

- 八溝山
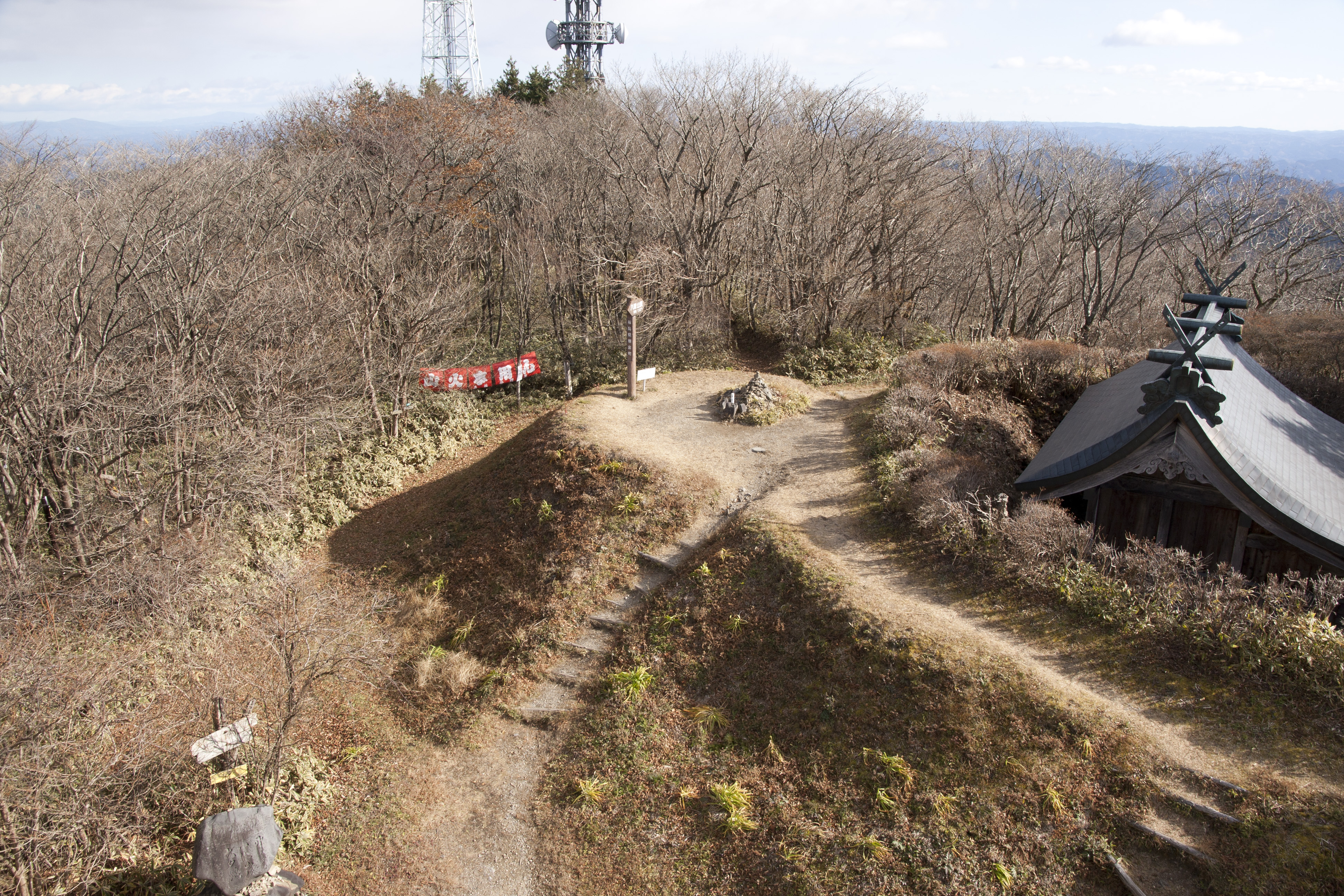
- Seem from the top of the mountain

Highest point
- Elevation: 1,021.8 m (3,352 ft)
- Listing: Mountains of Japan
- Coordinates: 36°55′49″N 140°16′23″E

Geography
- Location within Fukushima Prefecture Location within Japan
- Location: Ibaraki and Fukushima, Japan
- Parent range: Yamizo Mountains

Geology
- Mountain type: sandstone

Mount Yamizo (Japanese: 八溝山(やみぞさん), Hepburn: yamizosan) is a mountain and it stretches Ibaraki Prefecture with Fukushima in Japan. Mount Yamizo is the highest mountain in Ibaraki Prefecture.

== Access ==
The mountain is close to below-mentioned bus stop. The walk brings to the gate of a mountain from the bus stop at 2 hours.

- Ibaraki Kotsu - Jaketsu bus stop
  - For Hitachi-Daigo Station via Shimonomiya Station.

== Surrounding area ==
- Nichirinji Temple
