= Iwaki-Ishii Station =

Railway station in Yamatsuri, Fukushima Prefecture, Japan

Iwaki-Ishii Station 磐城石井駅
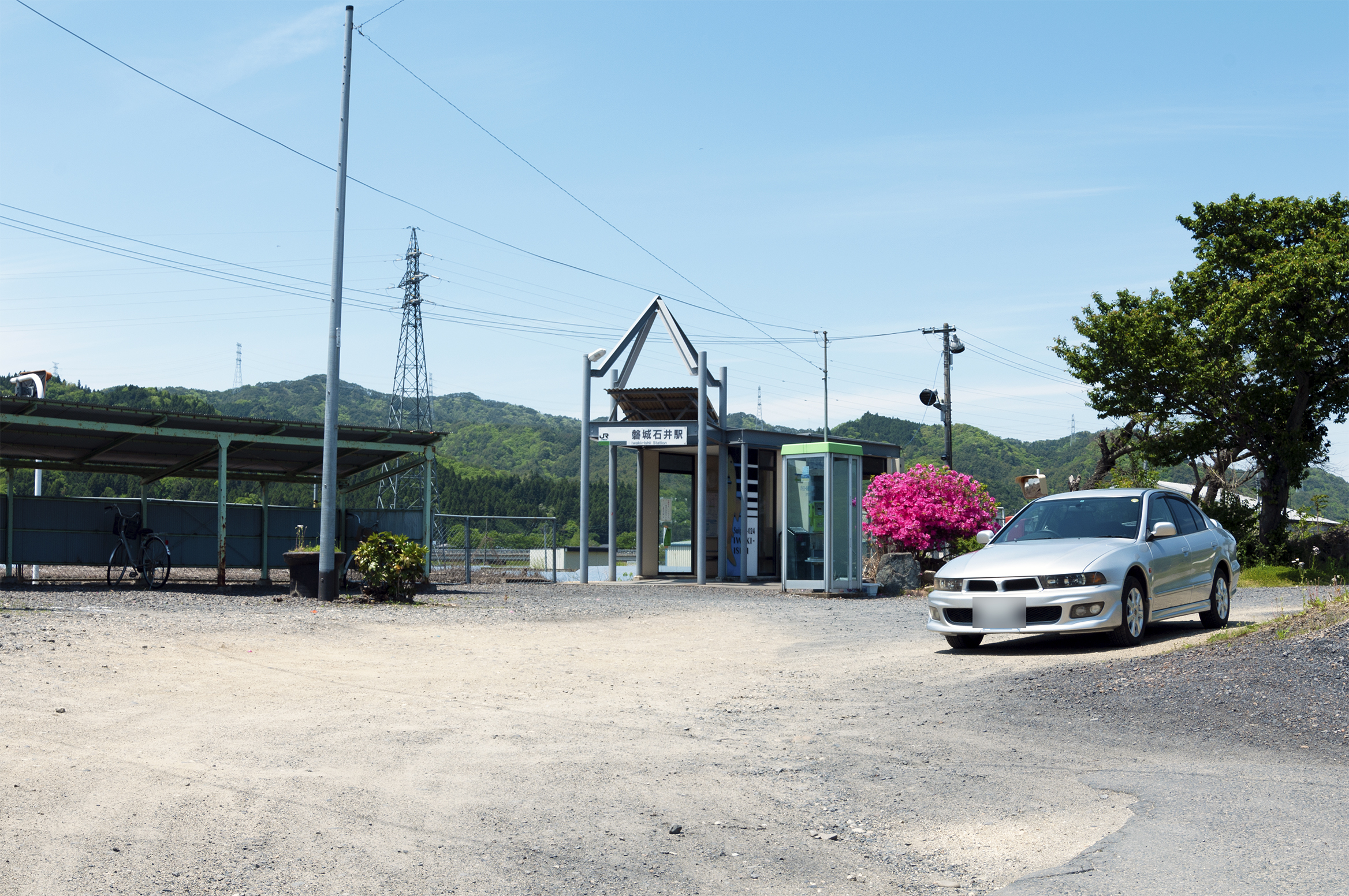
- Iwaki-Ishii Station in May 2011

General information
- Location: Nakaishii Goten Kawahara 11, Yamatsuri-machi, Higashishirakawa-gun, Fukushima-ken 963-5202; Japan
- Coordinates: 36.9043°N 140.4155°E
- Operator: JR East
- Line: ■ Suigun Line
- Distance: 74.9 km from Mito
- Platforms: 1 side platform
- Tracks: 1

Other information
- Status: Unstaffed
- Website: Official website

History
- Opened: October 10, 1931

Services
Preceding station	JR East	Following station
Minami-Ishii towards Mito	Suigun Line	Iwaki-Hanawa towards Kōriyama
Location
- Location within Fukushima Prefecture Location within Japan

Iwaki-Ishii Station (磐城石井駅, Iwaki-Ishii-eki) is a railway station on the Suigun Line in the town of Yamatsuri, Fukushima, Japan operated by East Japan Railway Company (JR East).

== Lines ==
Iwaki-Ishii Station is served by the Suigun Line, and is located 74.9 rail kilometers from the official starting point of the line at Mito.

== Station layout ==
Iwaki-Ishii Station has one side platform serving a single bi-directional track. The station originally had two side platforms, and the unused platform and footbridge are still in place. The station is unattended.

== History ==
The station opened on October 10, 1931. The station was absorbed into the JR East network upon the privatization of the Japanese National Railways (JNR) on April 1, 1987.

== Surrounding area ==
- National Route 118
- Takajo Post Office

== See also ==
- List of railway stations in Japan
