= Yamatsuri, Fukushima =

Town in Fukushima Prefecture, Japan

Yamatsuri 矢祭町
- Town
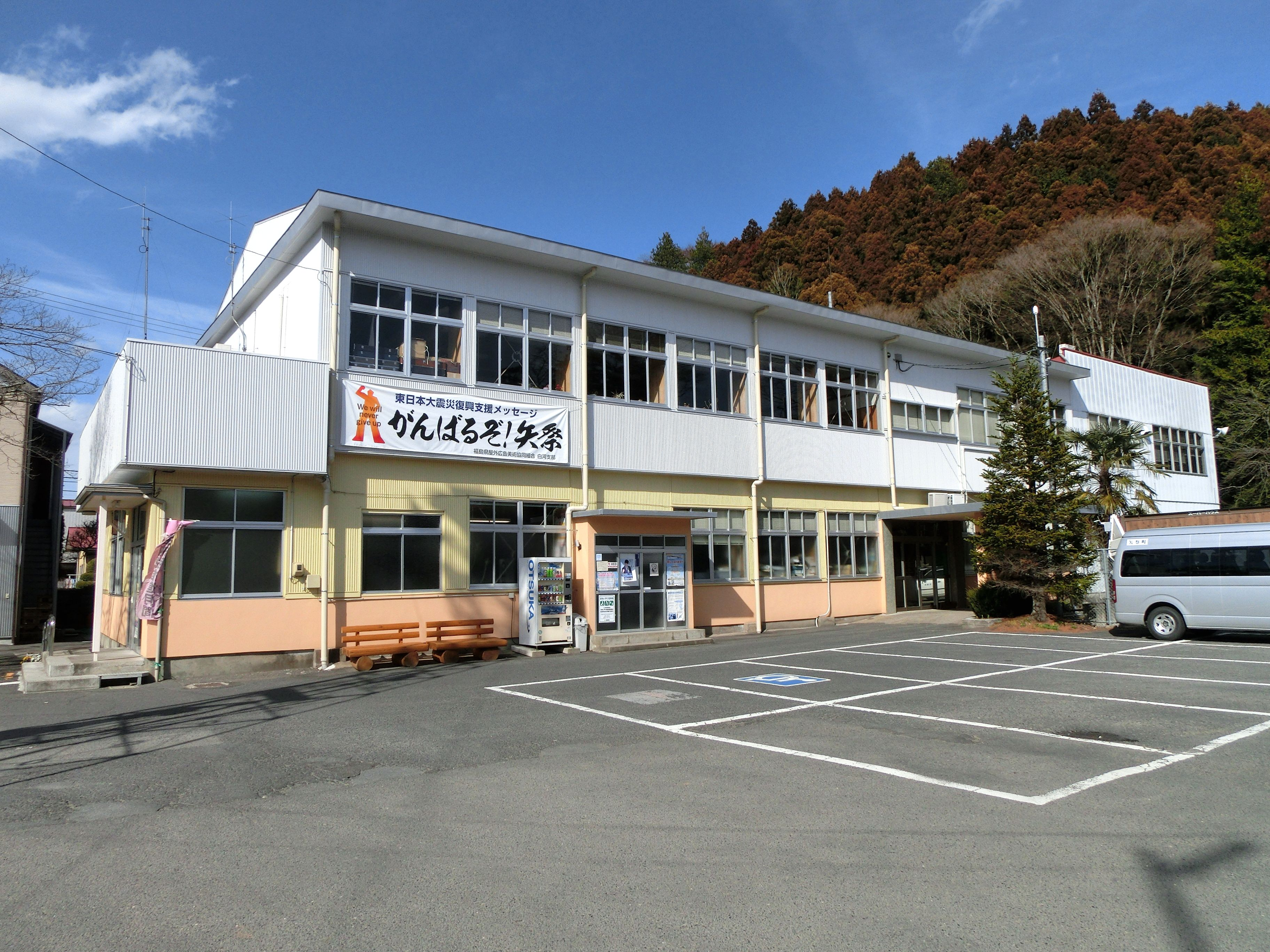
- Yamatsuri Town Hall

- Flag Seal

- Location of Yamatsuri in Fukushima Prefecture

- Coordinates: 36°52′16.8″N 140°25′29″E
- Country: Japan
- Region: Tōhoku
- Prefecture: Fukushima
- District: Higashishirakawa

Government
  - Mayor: Makoto Kobari

Area
  - Total: 118.27 km^{2} (45.66 sq mi)

Population (March 2020)
  - Total: 5,702
  - Density: 48.21/km^{2} (124.9/sq mi)
- Time zone: UTC+9 (Japan Standard Time)
- Tree: Japanese Red Pine
- Flower: Azalea
- Bird: Oriental turtle dove
- Phone number: 0247-46-3131
- Address: 66 Tatemoto, Higashitate, Yamatsuri-machi, Higashishirakawa-gun, Fukushima-ken 963-5118
- Website: Official website

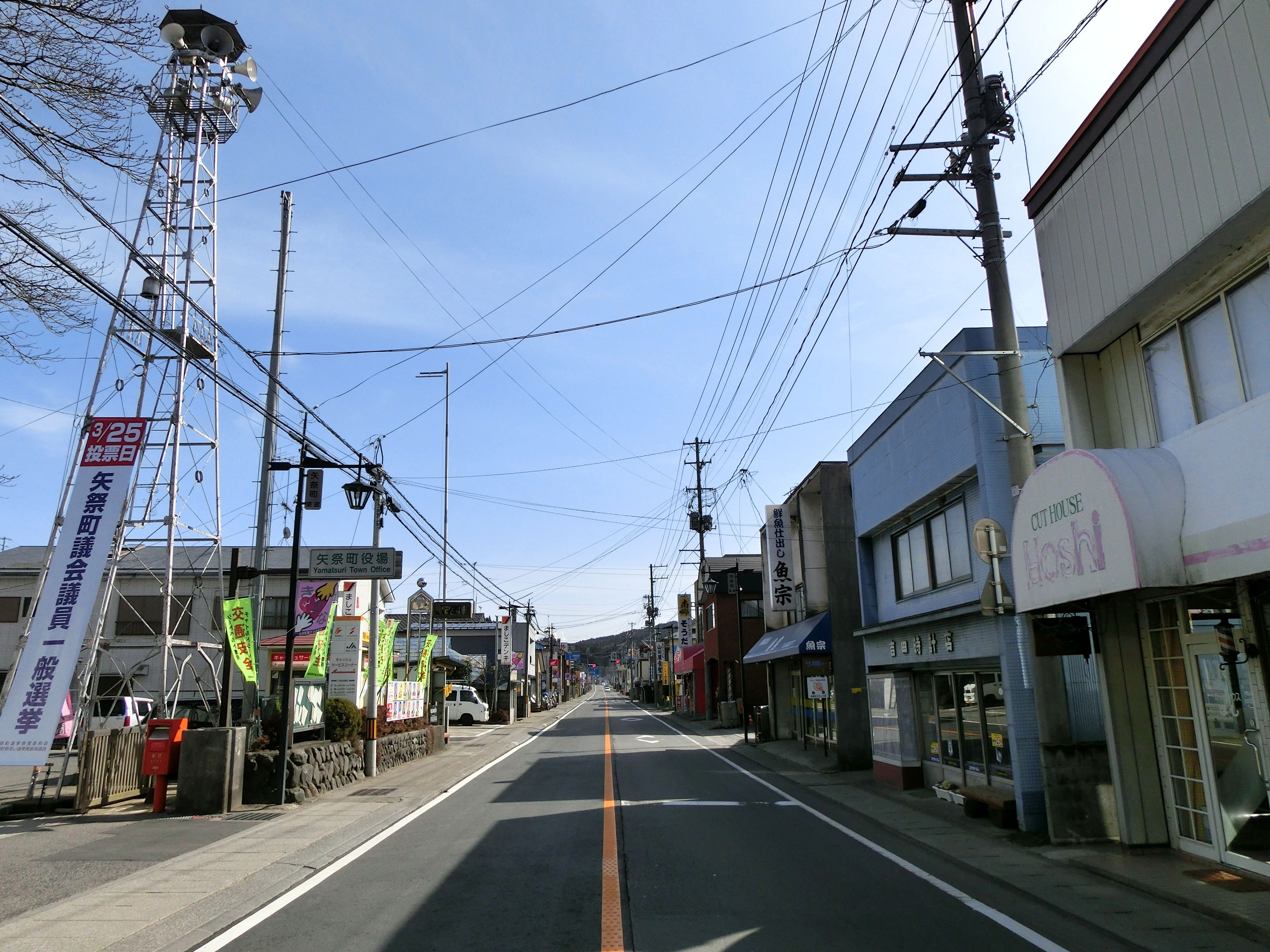
Central Yamatsuri

Yamatsuri (矢祭町, Yamatsuri-machi) is a town located in Fukushima Prefecture, Japan. As of 1 March 2020, the town had an estimated population of 5,702 across 2,095 households, and a population density of 48 persons per km^{2}. The total area of the town was 118.27 square kilometres (45.7 sq mi).

== Geography ==
Yamatsuri is located in the southernmost portion of Fukushima prefecture, bordering on Ibaraki Prefecture to the south and Tochigi Prefecture to the west. Mt. Yamatsuri is in the center of the town, and the Kuji River flows from north to south. To the east of the town are the Abukuma Mountains.

- Mountains: Yamatsuriyama (382.7 m), Yamizosan (1021.8 m)
- Rivers: Kuji River, Yamatsurigawa

=== Neighboring municipalities ===
- Fukushima Prefecture
  - Hanawa
  - Tanagura
- Ibaraki Prefecture
  - Daigo
  - Hitachiōta

=== Climate ===
Yamatsuri has a humid subtropical climate (Köppen climate classification Cfa). The average annual temperature in Yamatsuri is 11.7 °C (53.1 °F). The average annual rainfall is 1,428 mm (56.2 in) with September as the wettest month. The temperatures are highest on average in August, at around 25.3 °C (77.5 °F), and lowest in Yamatsuri, at around −0.9 °C (30.4 °F).

== Demographics ==
Per Japanese census data, the population of Yamatsuri has been declining over the past 60 years.

Historical population
Year	Pop.	±%
1960	11,704	—
1970	9,211	−21.3%
1980	8,074	−12.3%
1990	7,596	−5.9%
2000	7,062	−7.0%
2010	6,348	−10.1%
2020	5,392	−15.1%

== History ==
The area of present-day Yamatsuri was part of ancient Mutsu Province. The area formed part of the holdings of Tanagura Domain, in the early Edo period, but mostly became tenryō territory under direct control of the Tokugawa Shogunate after 1729. After the Meiji Restoration, it was organized as part of Higashishirakawa District within the Nakadōri region of Iwaki Province. The villages of Toyosato, Takagi and Ishii were created with the establishment of the modern municipalities system on April 1, 1889. On March 31, 1955, Toyosato and a portion of the village of Takagi merged to form the village of Yamatsuri. It was elevated to town status on January 1, 1963.

== Economy ==
The economy of Yamatsuri is primarily agricultural.

== Education ==
Yamatsuri has one public elementary school and one public junior high school operated by the town government. The town does not have a high school.

== Transportation ==
=== Railway ===
- JR East – Suigun Line
  - Yamatsuriyama - Higashidate - Minami-Ishii - Iwaki-Ishii

=== Highway ===
- National Route 118
- National Route 349

== International relations ==
- City of Rockdale, New South Wales, Australia
