= Suifu, Ibaraki =

Dissolved municipality in Ibaraki prefecture, Japan

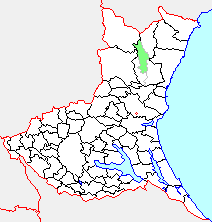
Map of Suifu, Ibaraki

Suifu (水府村, Suifu-mura) was a village located in Kuji District, Ibaraki Prefecture, Japan.

As of 2003, the village had an estimated population of 6,011 and a density of 74.28 persons per km^{2}. The total area was 80.92 km^{2}.

On December 1, 2004, Suifu, along with the town of Kanasagō, and the village of Satomi (all from Kuji District), was merged into the expanded city of Hitachiōta and no longer exists as an independent municipality.
