= Higashidate Station =

Railway station in Yamatsuri, Fukushima Prefecture, Japan

Higashidate Station 東館駅
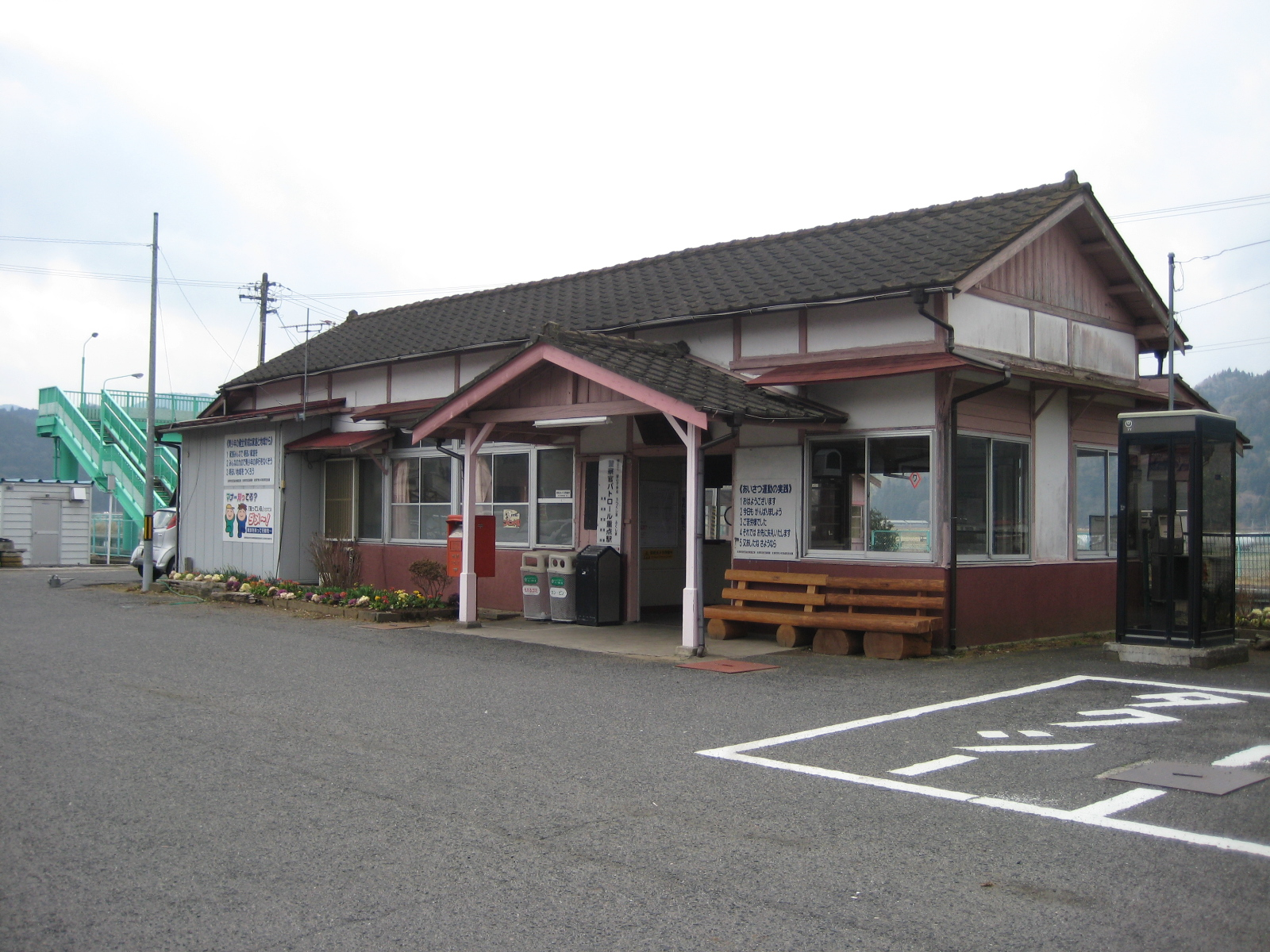
- Higashidate Station in March 2008

General information
- Location: Higashidate Ishida 32, Yamatsuri-machi, Higashishirakawa-gun, Fukushima-ken 963-5118; Japan
- Coordinates: 36.8701°N 140.4231°E
- Operator: JR East
- Line: ■ Suigun Line
- Distance: 71.0 km from Mito
- Platforms: 2 side platforms
- Tracks: 2

Other information
- Status: Staffed
- Website: Official website

History
- Opened: April 16, 1930

Passengers
- FY2018: 80 daily

Services
Preceding station	JR East	Following station
Yamatsuriyama towards Mito	Suigun Line	Minami-Ishii towards Kōriyama
Location
- Location within Fukushima Prefecture Location within Japan

Higashidate Station (東館駅, Higashidate-eki) is a railway station in the town of Yamatsuri, Fukushima, Japan operated by East Japan Railway Company (JR East).

== Lines ==
Higashidate Station is served by the Suigun Line, and is located 71.0 rail kilometers from the official starting point of the line at Mito. It is almost exactly halfway between Mito and the terminus of Kōriyama.

== Station layout ==
The station has two opposed side platforms connected to the station building by a level crossing. The station is attended.

=== Platforms ===
1	■ Suigun Line	for Mito
2	■ Suigun Line	for Iwaki-Ishikawa and Kōriyama

== History ==
Higashidate Station opened on April 16, 1930. The station was absorbed into the JR East network upon the privatization of the Japanese National Railways (JNR) on April 1, 1987.

== Passenger statistics ==
In fiscal 2018, the station was used by an average of 80 passengers daily (boarding passengers only).

== Bus routes ==
- Fukushima Transportation
  - For Ōnukari Myōjin
  - For Kami-myoga via Yamatsuriyama Station and Takachihara-iriguchi
  - For Oiwake

== Surrounding area ==
- National Route 118
- National Route 349
- Yamatsuri Town Hall
- Yamatsuri Industrial Park

== See also ==
- List of railway stations in Japan
