= Kuji District =

District in Ibaraki Prefecture, Japan

Location of Kuji District in Ibaraki Prefecture

Kuji (久慈郡, Kuji-gun) is a district located in Ibaraki Prefecture, Japan.

== Town ==
- Daigo

== Merger ==
- On December 1, 2004, the town of Kanasagō, and the villages of Satomi and Suifu merged into the expanded city of Hitachiōta.
