= Kanasagō, Ibaraki =

Dissolved municipality in Ibaraki prefecture, Japan

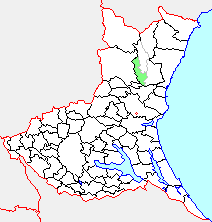
Map of Kanasagō, Ibaraki

Kanasagō (金砂郷町, Kanasagō-machi) was a town located in Kuji District, Ibaraki Prefecture, Japan.

As of 2003, the town had an estimated population of 11,303 and a density of 183.37 persons per km^{2}. The total area was 61.64 km^{2}.

On December 1, 2004, Kanasagō, along with the villages of Satomi and Suifu (all from Kuji District), was merged into the expanded city of Hitachiōta and no longer exists as an independent municipality.
