= Iwaki-Tokiwa Station =

Railway station in Tamura, Fukushima Prefecture, Japan

Iwaki-Tokiwa Station 磐城常葉駅
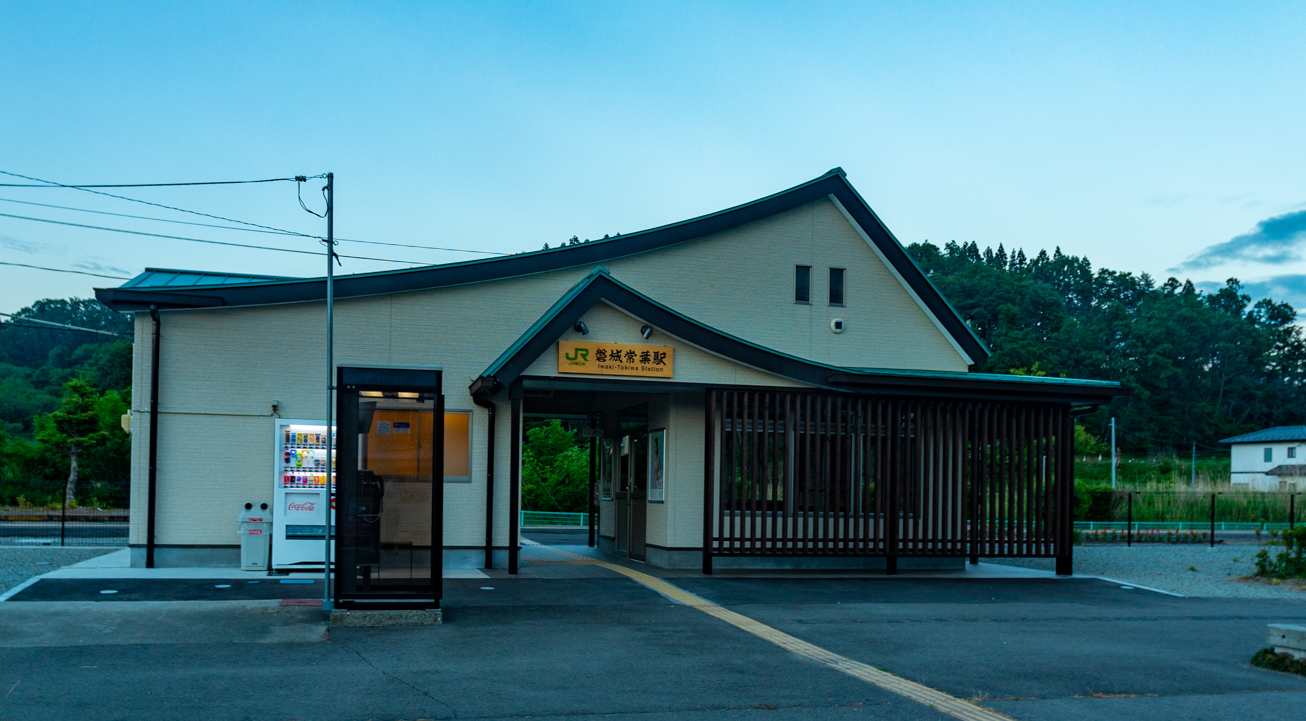
- Iwaki-Tokiwa Station in July 2013

General information
- Location: Funahiki-cho Imaizumi Tanaka 83, Tamura-shi, Fukushima-ken 963-4311; Japan
- Coordinates: 37.4204°N 140.6056°E
- Operator: JR East
- Line: ■ Ban'etsu East Line
- Distance: 58.7 km from Iwaki
- Platforms: 1 island platform

Other information
- Status: Unstaffed
- Website: Official website

History
- Opened: April 10, 1921

Passengers
- FY2005: 293

Services
Preceding station	JR East	Following station
Funehiki towards Kōriyama	Ban'etsu East Line Local	Ōgoe towards Iwaki
Location
- Location within Fukushima Prefecture Location within Japan

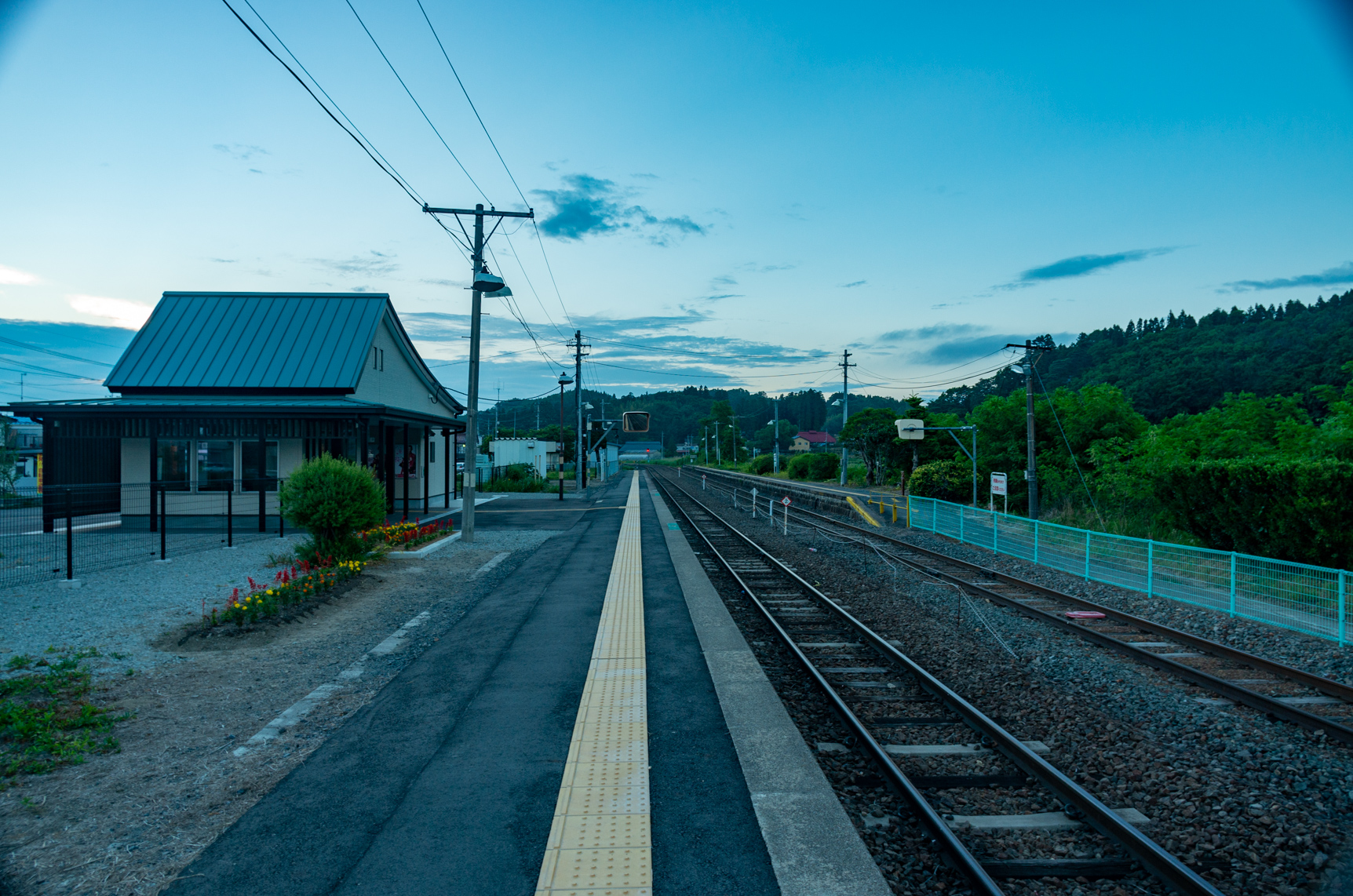
Platforms

Iwaki-Tokiwa Station (磐城常葉駅, Iwaki-Tokiwa-eki) is a railway station in the city of Tamura, Fukushima Prefecture, Fukushima Prefecture, Japan, operated by East Japan Railway Company (JR East).

== Lines ==
Iwaki-Tokiwa Station is served by the Ban'etsu East Line, and is located 58.7 rail kilometers from the official starting point of the line at Iwaki.

== Station layout ==
The station has two opposed side platforms connected to the station building by a level crossing. The station is unstaffed.

=== Platforms ===
1	■ Ban'etsu East Line	for Miharu and Kōriyama
2	■ Ban'etsu East Line	for Ononiimachi and Iwaki

== History ==
Iwaki-Tokiwa Station opened on April 10, 1921. The station was absorbed into the JR East network upon the privatization of the Japanese National Railways (JNR) on April 1, 1987. A new station building was completed in December 2012.

== Passenger statistics ==
In fiscal 2005, the station was used by an average of 293 passengers daily (boarding passengers only).

== Surrounding area ==
- National Route 349

== See also ==
- List of railway stations in Japan
