= Ōgoe Station =

Railway station in Tamura, Fukushima Prefecture, Japan

Ōgoe Station 大越駅
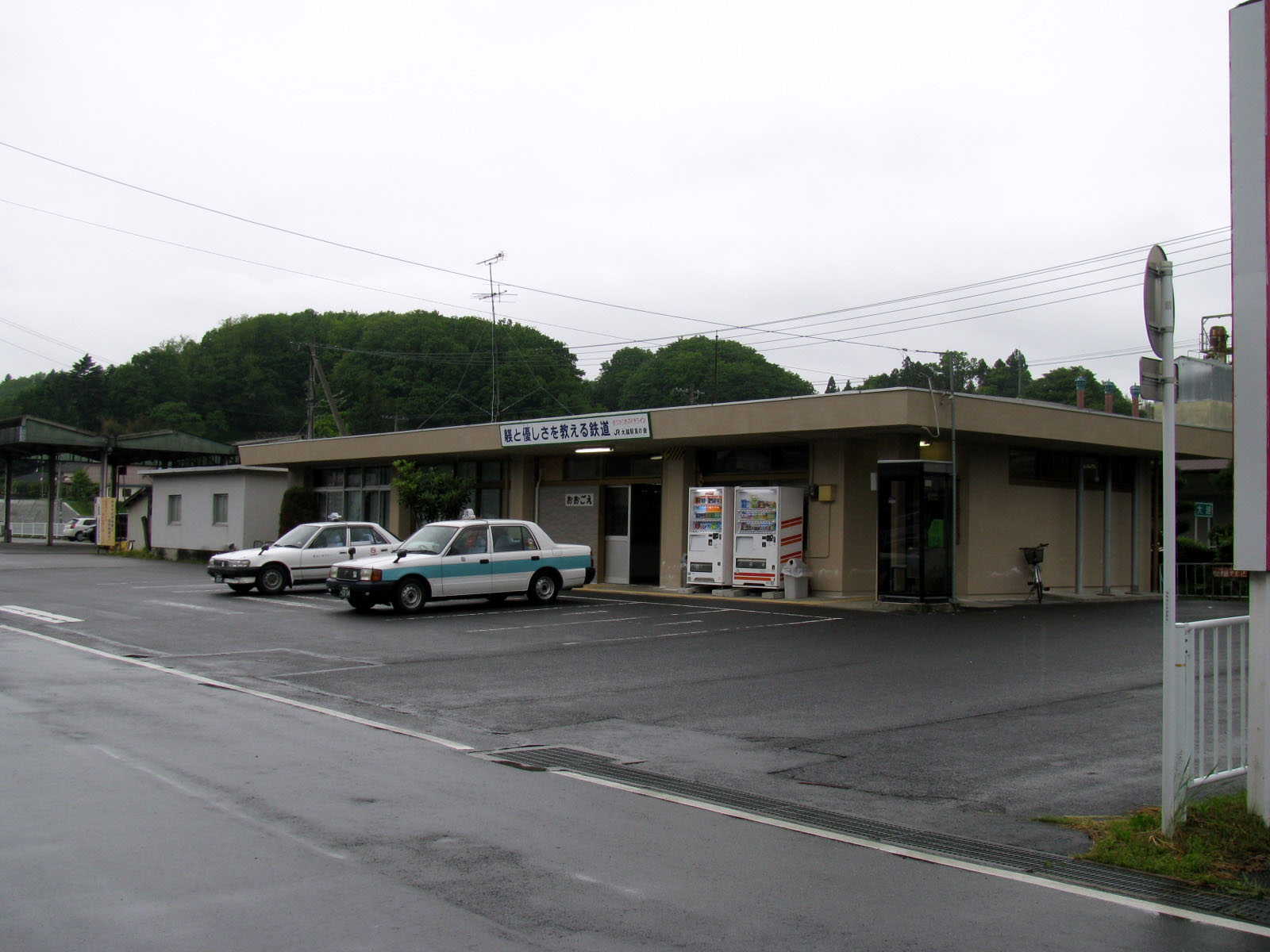
- Ōgoe Station building in May 2008

General information
- Location: Ōgoe, Tamura-shi, Fukushima-ken 963-4111; Japan
- Coordinates: 37.3869°N 140.6307°E
- Operator: JR East
- Line: ■ Ban'etsu East Line
- Distance: 54.3 km from Iwaki
- Platforms: 1 island platform

Other information
- Status: Unstaffed
- Website: Official website

History
- Opened: March 21, 1915

Passengers
- FY2015: 216

Services
Preceding station	JR East	Following station
Funehiki towards Kōriyama	Ban'etsu East Line Rapid Abukuma	Kanmata towards Iwaki
Iwaki-Tokiwa towards Kōriyama	Ban'etsu East Line Local	Sugaya towards Iwaki
Location
- Location within Fukushima Prefecture Location within Japan

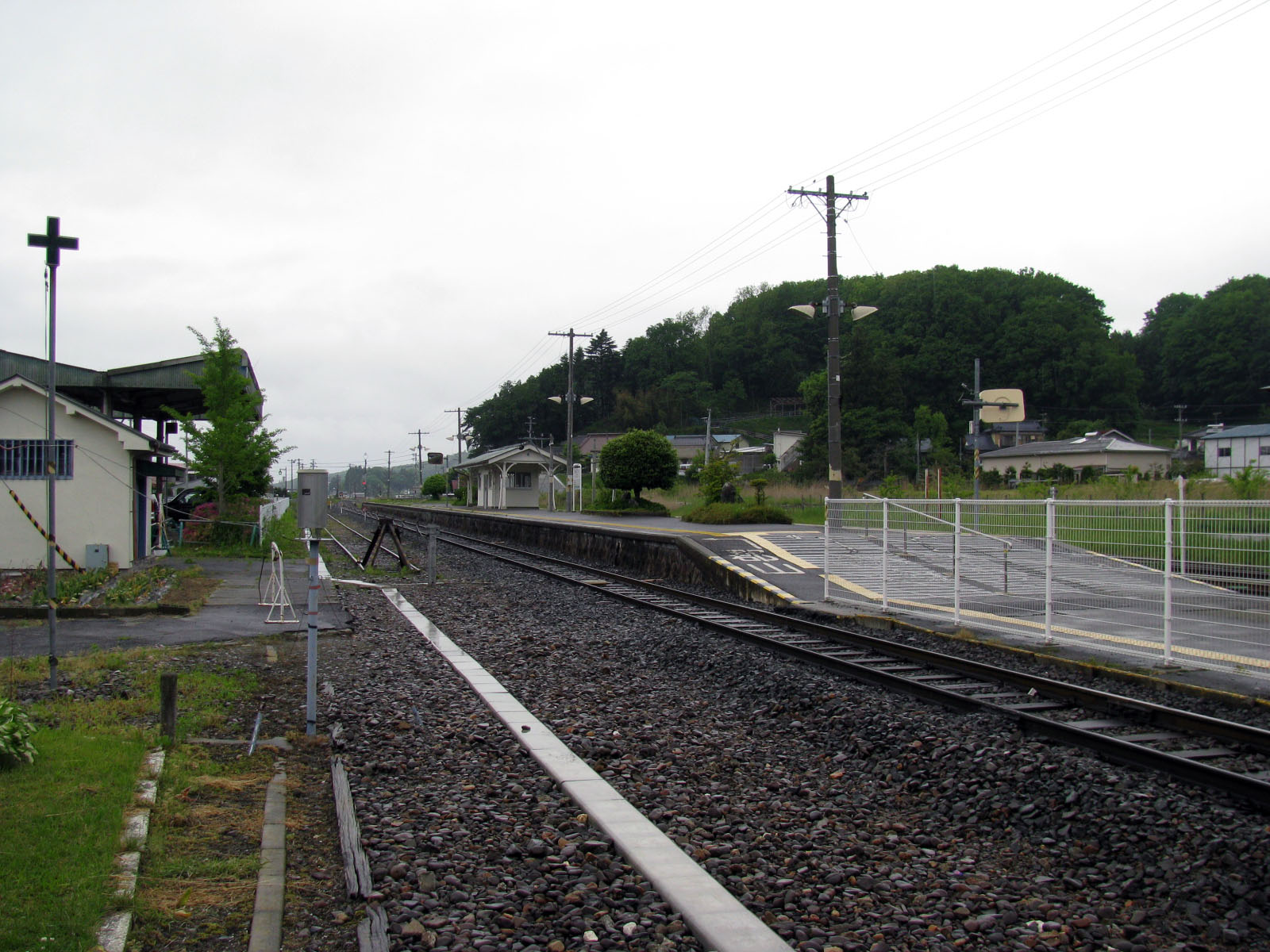
Platforms

Ōgoe Station (大越駅, Ōgoe-eki) is a railway station in the city of Tamura, Fukushima Prefecture, Fukushima Prefecture, Japan, operated by East Japan Railway Company (JR East).

== Lines ==
Ōgoe Station is served by the Ban'etsu East Line, and is located 54.3 rail kilometers from the official starting point of the line at Iwaki.

== Station layout ==
The station has one island platform connected to the station building by a level crossing. The station is unstaffed.

=== Platforms ===
1	■ Ban'etsu East Line	for Miharu and Kōriyama
2	■ Ban'etsu East Line	for Ononiimachi and Iwaki

== History ==
Ōgoe Station opened on March 21, 1915. The station was absorbed into the JR East network upon the privatization of the Japanese National Railways (JNR) on April 1, 1987.

== Passenger statistics ==
In fiscal 2015, the station was used by an average of 216 passengers daily (boarding passengers only).

== Surrounding area ==
- Ōgoe Post Office
- former Ōgoe Town Hall
