= Mōgi Station =

Railway station in Kōriyama, Fukushima Prefecture, Japan

Mōgi Station 舞木駅
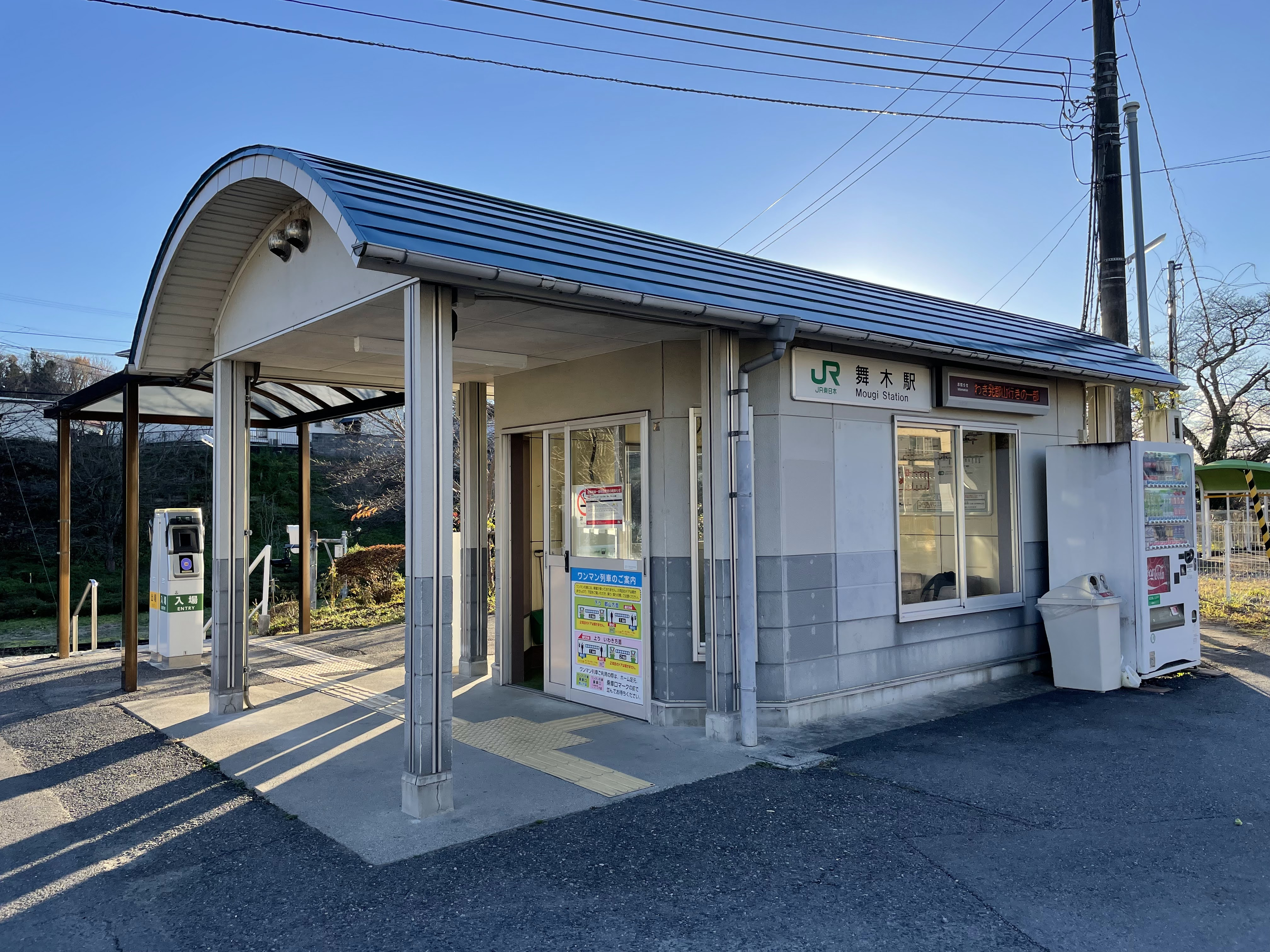
- Mōgi Station in November 2021

General information
- Location: Mōgi-cho Taira 189-2, Kōriyama-shi, Fukushima-ken 963-0661; Japan
- Coordinates: 37.4168°N 140.4353°E
- Operator: JR East
- Line: ■ Ban'etsu East Line
- Distance: 79.8 km from Iwaki
- Platforms: 1 island platform

Other information
- Status: Unstaffed
- Website: Official website

History
- Opened: July 21, 1914

Passengers
- FY2004: 542 daily

Services
Preceding station	JR East	Following station
Kōriyama Terminus	Ban'etsu East Line Local	Miharu towards Iwaki
Location
- Location within Fukushima Prefecture Location within Japan

Mōgi Station (舞木駅, Mōgi-eki) is a railway station in the city of Kōriyama, Fukushima, Japan, operated by East Japan Railway Company (JR East).

== Lines ==
Mōgi Station is served by the Ban'etsu East Line, and is located 79.8 rail kilometers from the official starting point of the line at Iwaki.

== Station layout ==
The station has two opposed side platforms connected to the station building by a level crossing. The station is unstaffed.

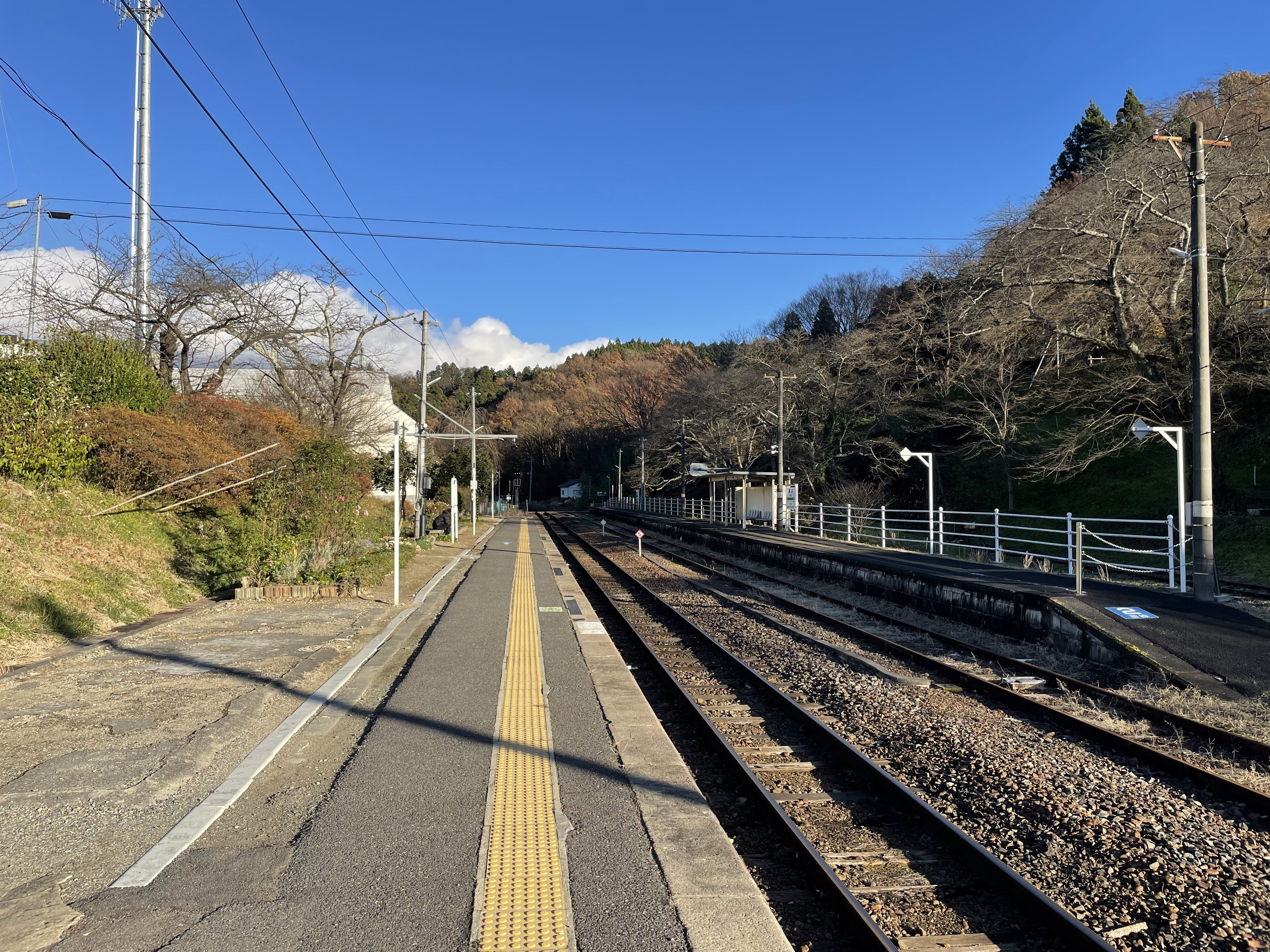
Platform for Iwaki, 2021

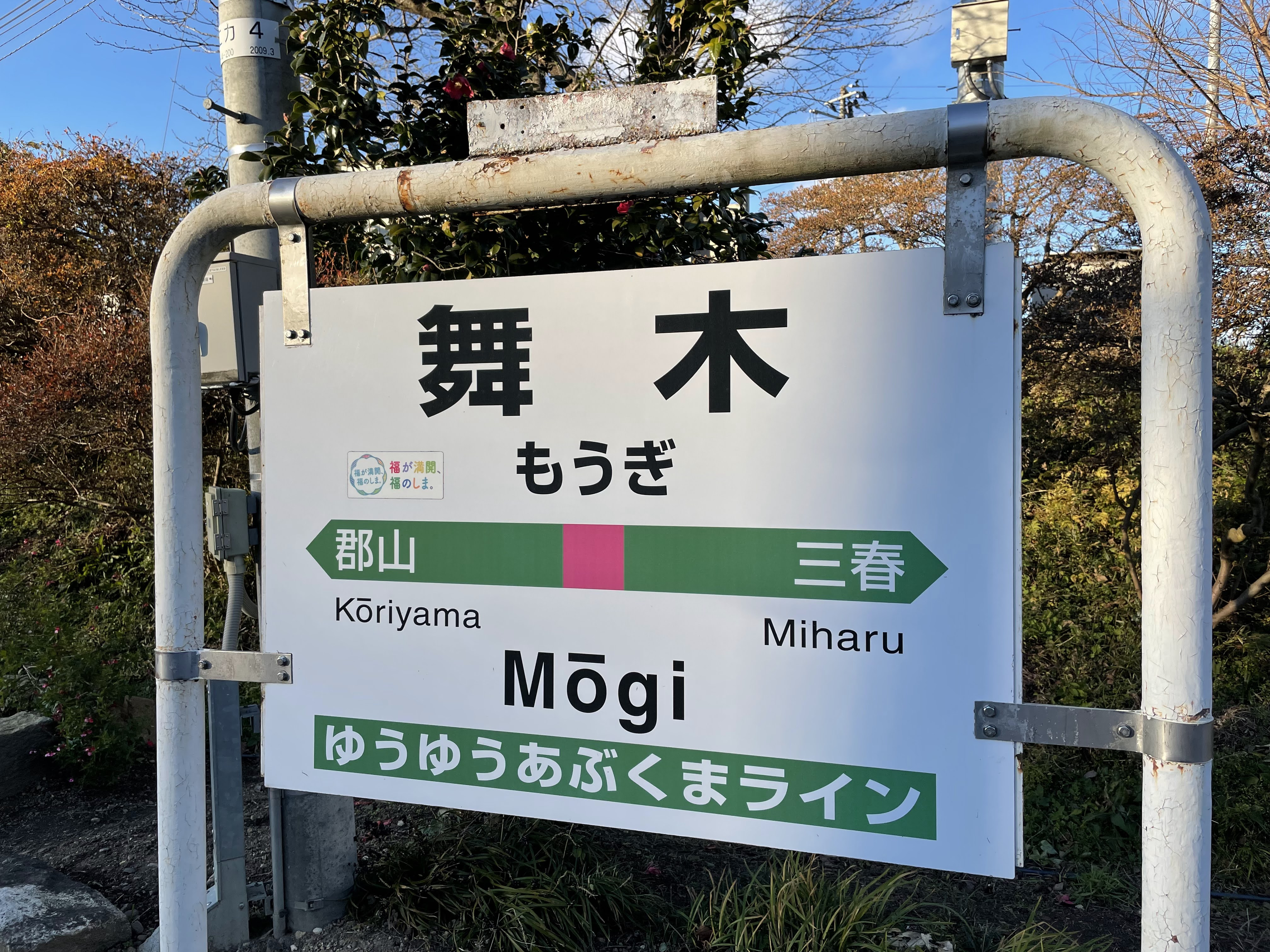
Name sign, 2021

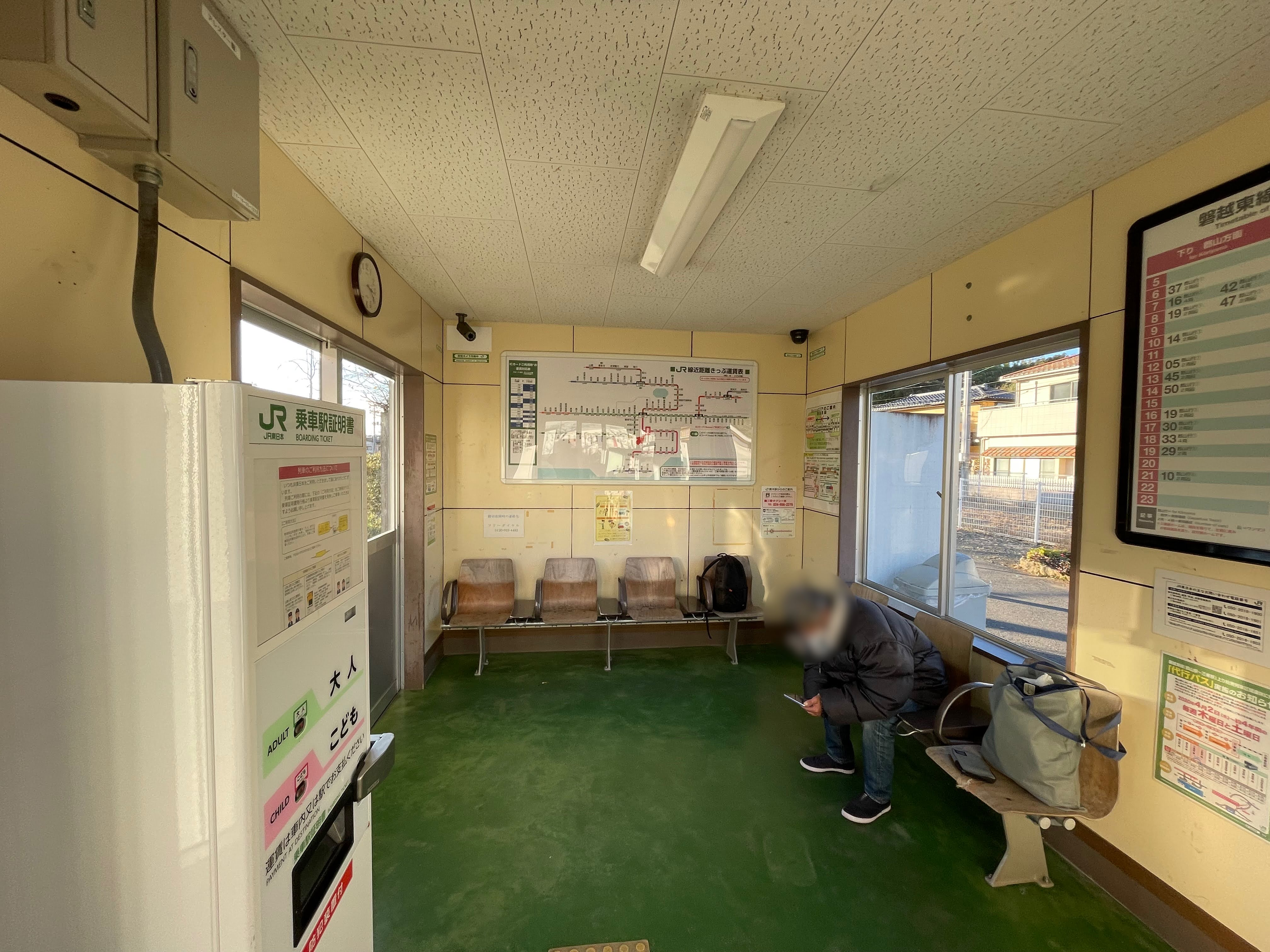
Waiting room, 2021

=== Platforms ===
1	■ Ban'etsu East Line	for Miharu, Funahiki, Ononiimachi and Iwaki for Kōriyama
2	■ Ban'etsu East Line	for Kōriyama

== History ==
Mōgi Station opened on July 21, 1914. The station was absorbed into the JR East network upon the privatization of the Japanese National Railways (JNR) on April 1, 1987.

== Surrounding area ==
- National Route 288

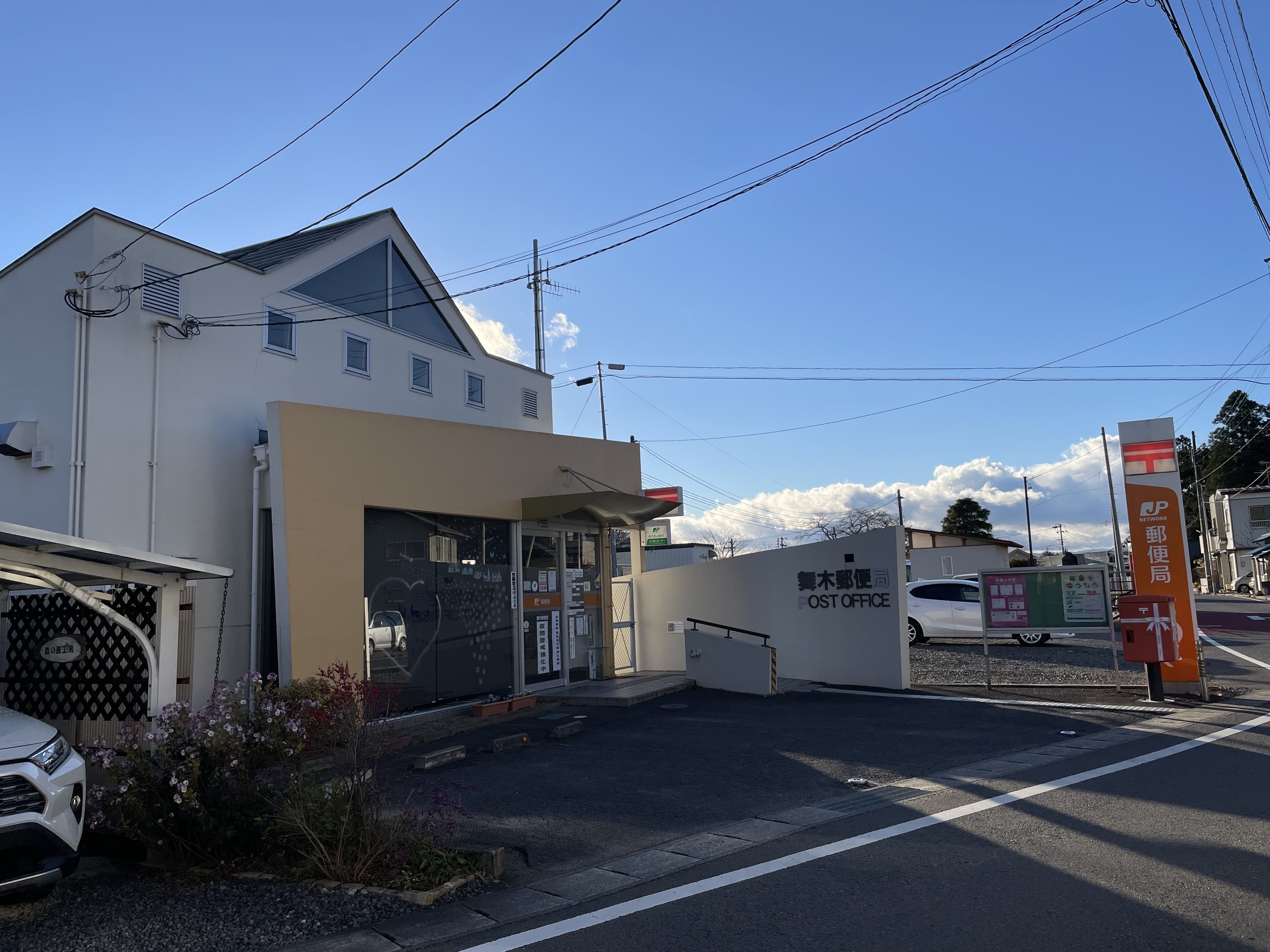
Mōgi Post office, 2021

== See also ==
- List of railway stations in Japan
