= Kanmata Station =

Railway station in Tamura, Fukushima Prefecture, Japan

Kanmata Station 神俣駅
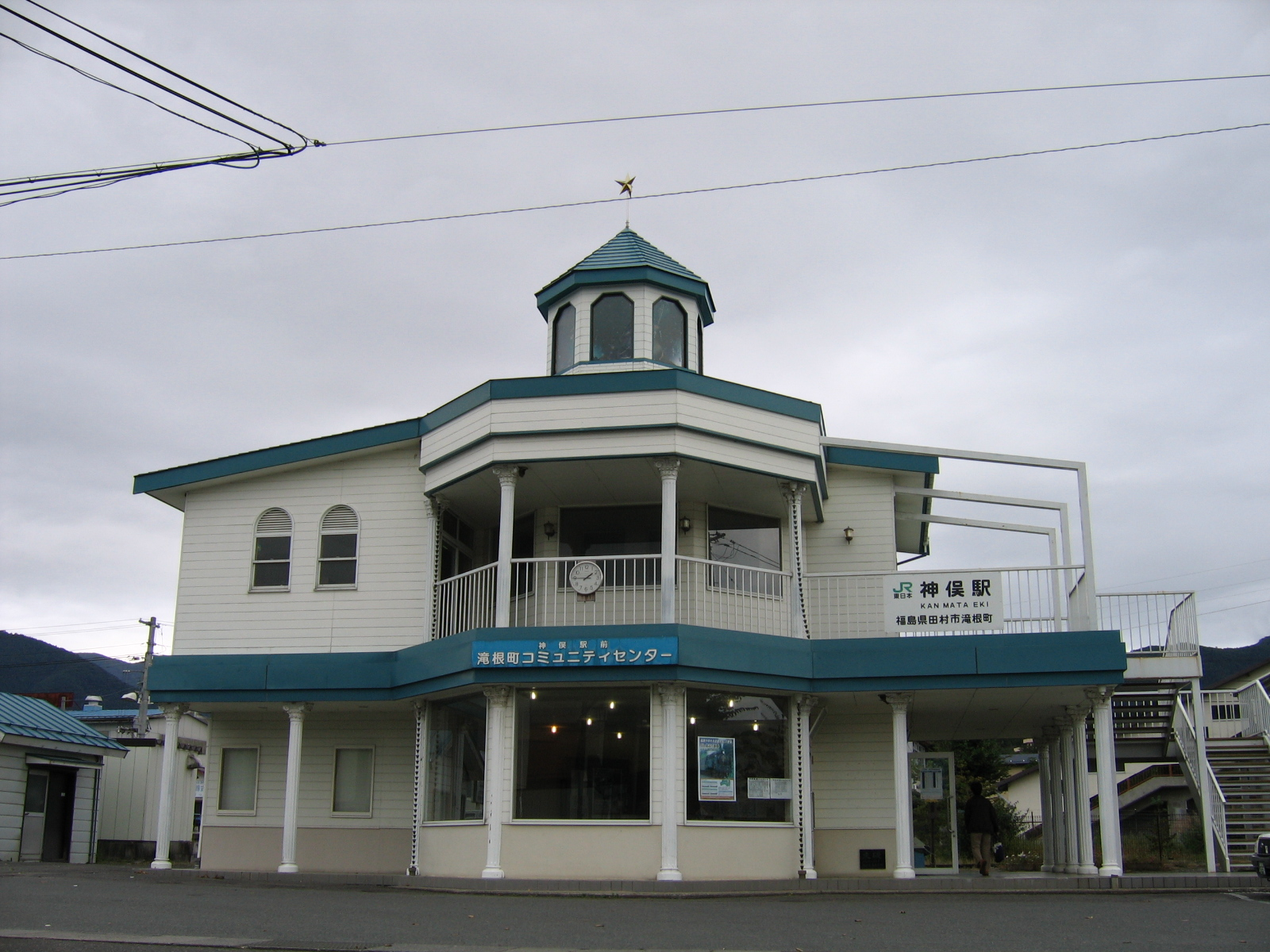
- Kanmata Station in October 2005

General information
- Location: Takine-cho Kanmata Bontengawa 75, Tamura-shi, Fukushima-ken 963-3602; Japan
- Coordinates: 37.3242°N 140.6594°E
- Operator: JR East
- Line: ■ Ban'etsu East Line
- Distance: 46.6 km from Iwaki
- Platforms: 1 island platform

Other information
- Status: Staffed
- Website: Official website

History
- Opened: March 21, 1915

Passengers
- FY2018: 148 daily

Services
Preceding station	JR East	Following station
Ōgoe towards Kōriyama	Ban'etsu East Line Rapid Abukuma	Ononiimachi towards Iwaki
Sugaya towards Kōriyama	Ban'etsu East Line Local	Ononiimachi towards Iwaki
Location
- Location within Fukushima Prefecture Location within Japan

Kanmata Station (神俣駅, Kanmata-eki) is a railway station in the city of Tamura, Fukushima Prefecture, Fukushima Prefecture, Japan, operated by East Japan Railway Company (JR East).

== Lines ==
Kanmata Station is served by the Ban'etsu East Line, and is located 46.6 rail kilometers from the official starting point of the line at Iwaki.

== Station layout ==
The station has a single island platform connected to the station building by a level crossing. The station is staffed.

=== Platforms ===
1	■ Ban'etsu East Line	for Miharu and Kōriyama
2	■ Ban'etsu East Line	for Ononiimachi and Iwaki

== History ==
Kanmata Station opened on March 21, 1915. The station was absorbed into the JR East network upon the privatization of the Japanese National Railways (JNR) on April 1, 1987. A new station building was completed in 1991.

== Passenger statistics ==
In fiscal 2018, the station was used by an average of 148 passengers daily (boarding passengers only).

== Surrounding area ==
- former Takine Town Hall
- Takine Post Office
- Abukuma-do

== See also ==
- List of railway stations in Japan
