= Funehiki Station =

Railway station in Tamura, Fukushima Prefecture, Japan

Funehiki Station 船引駅
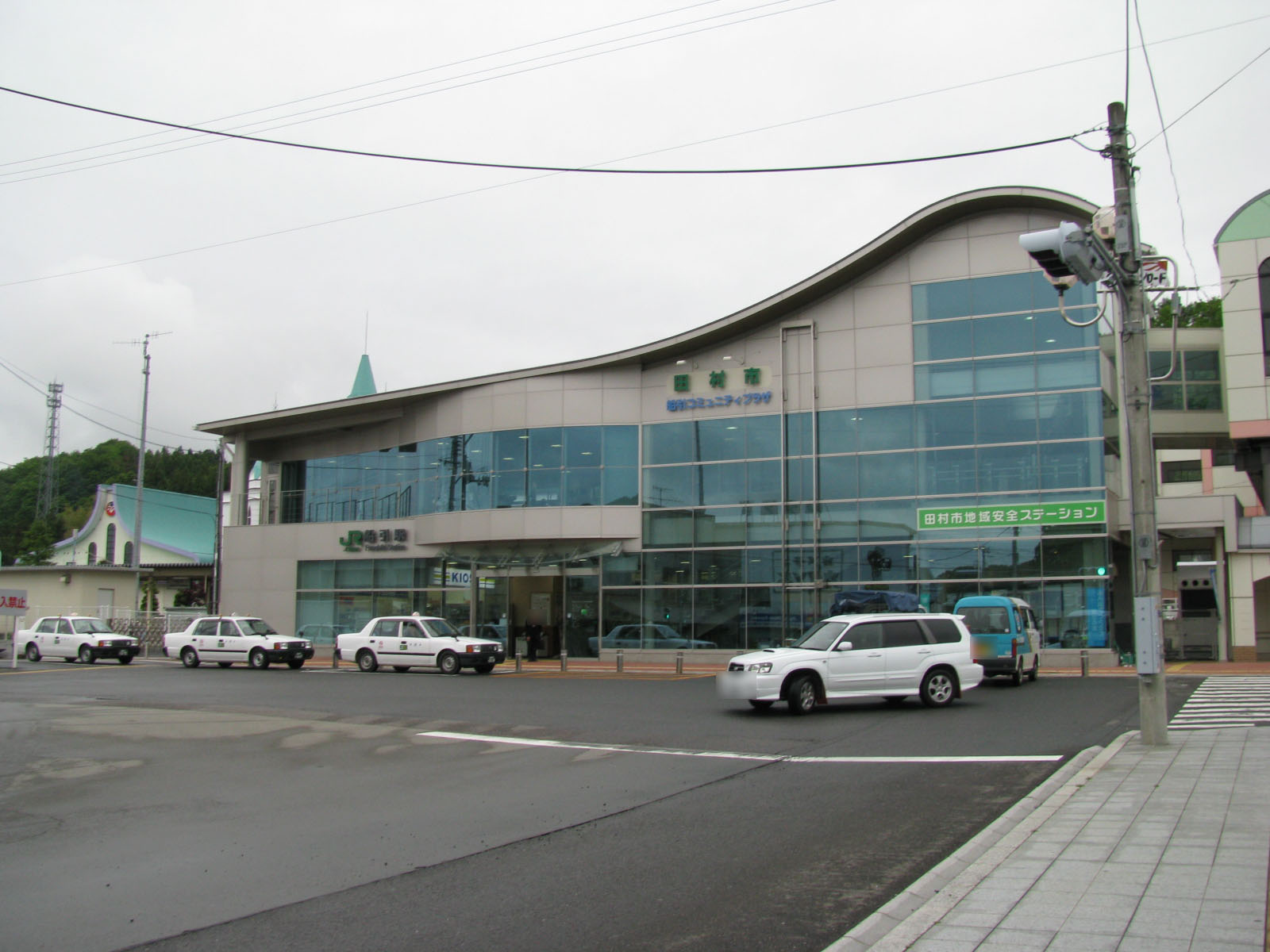
- Funehiki Station in May 2008

General information
- Location: Funehiki Uedanaka 4, Tamura-shi, Fukushima-ken 963-4312; Japan
- Coordinates: 37.4430°N 140.5743°E
- Operator: JR East
- Line: ■ Ban'etsu East Line
- Distance: 62.5 km from Iwaki
- Platforms: 1 island platform

Other information
- Status: Staffed (Midori no Madoguchi )
- Website: Official website

History
- Opened: March 21, 1915

Passengers
- FY 2018: 799 daily

Services
Preceding station	JR East	Following station
Miharu towards Kōriyama	Ban'etsu East Line Rapid Abukuma	Ōgoe towards Iwaki
Kanameta towards Kōriyama	Ban'etsu East Line Local	Iwaki-Tokiwa towards Iwaki
Location
- Location within Fukushima Prefecture Location within Japan

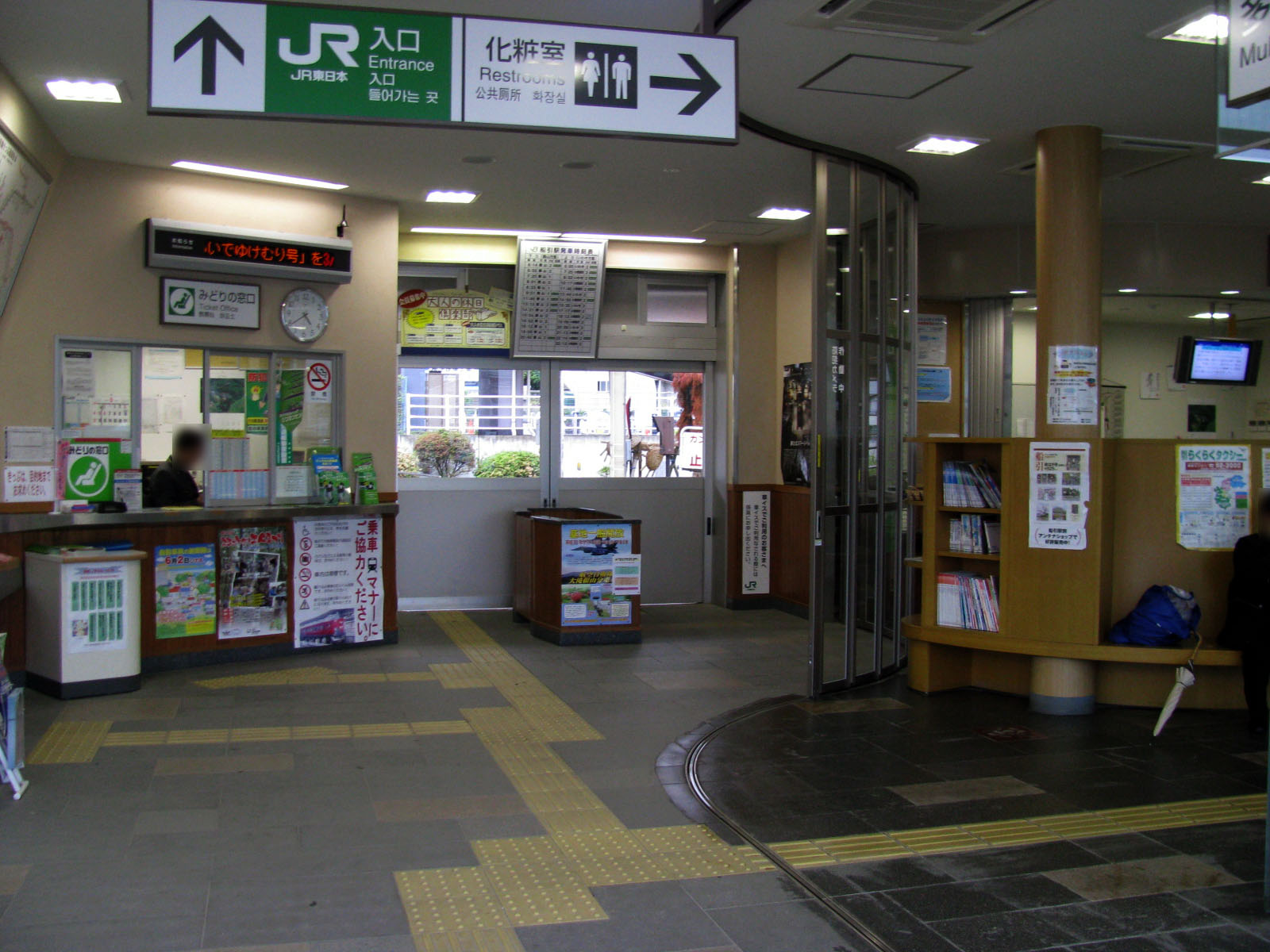
Inside Funehiki Station

Funehiki Station (船引駅, Funehiki-eki) is a railway station in the city of Tamura, Fukushima Prefecture, Fukushima Prefecture, Japan, operated by East Japan Railway Company (JR East).

== Lines ==
Funehiki Station is served by the Ban'etsu East Line, and is located 62.5 rail kilometers from the official starting point of the line at Iwaki.

== Station layout ==
The station has a single island platform connected to the station building by a level crossing. The station has a Midori no Madoguchi staffed ticket office.

=== Platforms ===
1	■ Ban'etsu East Line	for Miharu and Kōriyama
2	■ Ban'etsu East Line	for Ononiimachi and Iwaki

== History ==
Funehiki Station opened on March 21, 1915. The station was absorbed into the JR East network upon the privatization of the Japanese National Railways (JNR) on April 1, 1987.

== Passenger statistics ==
In fiscal 2018, the station was used by an average of 799 passengers daily (boarding passengers only).

== Surrounding area ==
- National Route 288
- National Route 349
- Funehiki Post Office
- Tamura City Hall

== See also ==
- List of railway stations in Japan
