= Ogawagō Station =

Railway station in Iwaki, Fukushima Prefecture, Japan

Ogawagō Station 小川郷駅
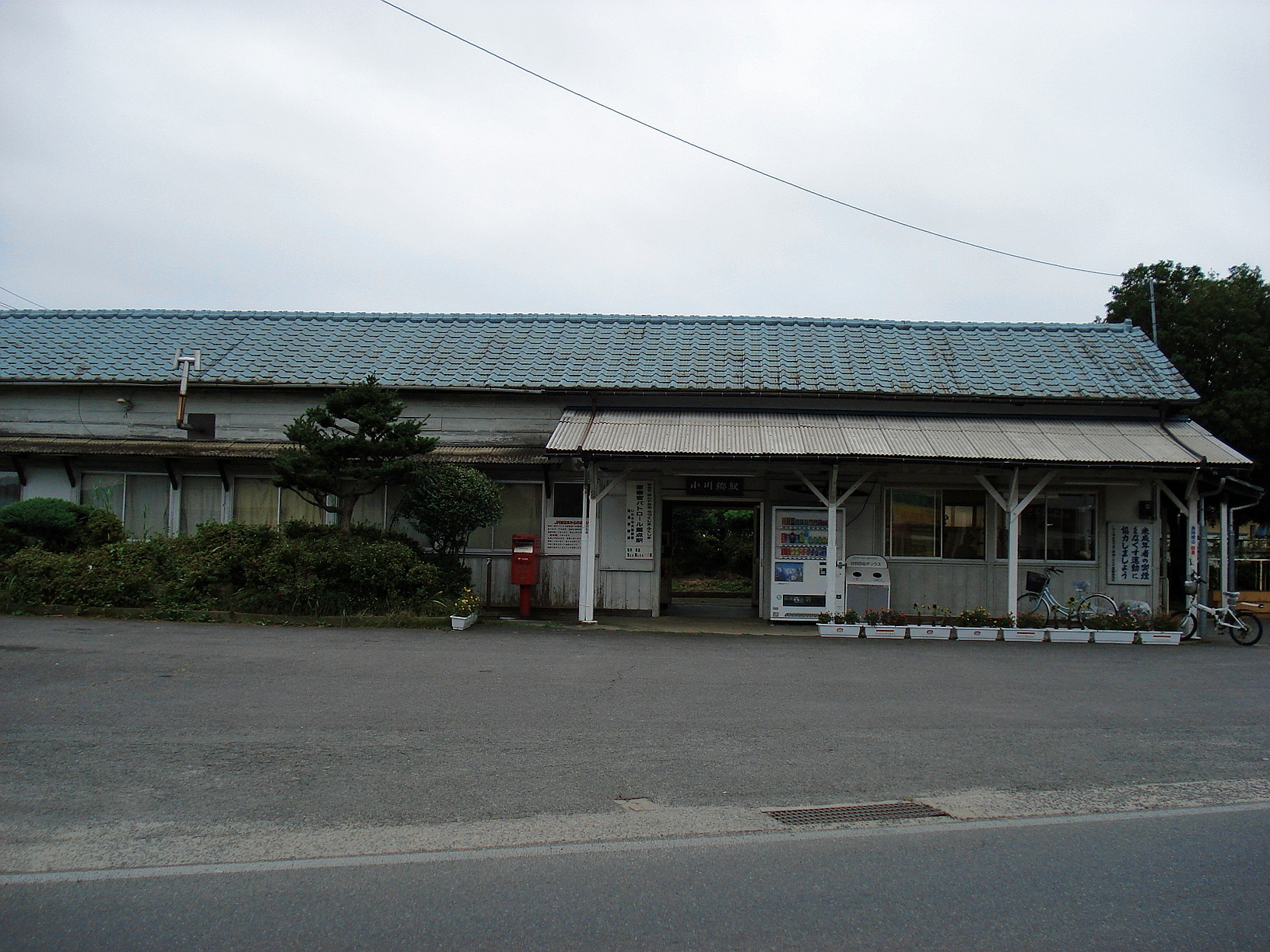
- Ogawagō Station in August 2008

General information
- Location: Ogawa-cho, Takahagi, Iwaki-shi, Fukushima-ken 979-3122; Japan
- Coordinates: 37.1266°N 140.8626°E
- Operator: JR East
- Line: ■ Ban'etsu East Line
- Distance: 10.3 km from Iwaki
- Platforms: 1 island platform

Other information
- Status: Unstaffed
- Website: Official website

History
- Opened: July 10, 1915

Services
Preceding station	JR East	Following station
Ononiimachi towards Kōriyama	Ban'etsu East Line Rapid Abukuma	Iwaki Terminus
Eda towards Kōriyama	Ban'etsu East Line Local	Akai towards Iwaki
Location
- Location within Fukushima Prefecture Location within Japan

Ogawagō Station (小川郷駅, Ogawagō-eki) is a railway station on the Ban'etsu East Line in the city of Iwaki, Fukushima Prefecture, Japan operated by East Japan Railway Company (JR East).

== Lines ==
Ogawagō Station is served by the Ban'etsu East Line, and is located 10.3 rail kilometers from the official starting point of the line at Iwaki Station in Fukushima

== Station layout ==
The station has a single island platform connected to the station building by an underground passage. The station is unattended.

=== Platforms ===
1	■ Ban'etsu East Line	for Ononiimachi, Miharu and Kōriyama for Iwaki (starting trains)
2	■ Ban'etsu East Line	for Iwaki

== History ==
Ogawagō Station opened on July 10, 1915. The station was absorbed into the JR East network upon the privatization of the Japanese National Railways (JNR) on April 1, 1987.

== Surrounding area ==
- National Route 399
- Ogawa Post office
- former Ogawa Town Hall

== See also ==
- List of railway stations in Japan
