= Ban-etsu Expressway =

Expressway in Fukushima and Niigata Prefectures, Japan

Ban-etsu Expressway
- 磐越自動車道

Route information
- Length: 212.7 km (132.2 mi)
- Existed: 1990–present

Major junctions
- From: Iwaki Junction in Iwaki, Fukushima; Jōban Expressway
- To: Niigata-Chūō Interchange in Niigata, Niigata; Niigata Prefectural Route 16; Niigata Prefectural Route 290

Location
- Country: Japan
- Major cities: Tamura, Kōriyama, Motomiya, Aizuwakamatsu, Agano, Gosen

Highway system
- National highways of Japan; Expressways of Japan

The Ban-etsu Expressway (磐越自動車道, Ban'etsu Jidōsha-dō) is a national expressway in the Tōhoku region of Japan. It is owned and operated by East Nippon Expressway Company.

== Naming ==
The name Ban-etsu (磐越) is a kanji acronym consisting of characters found in the former names of the provinces linked by the expressway. Iwaki Province (磐城) consists of the eastern part of present-day Fukushima Prefecture, and Echigo Province (越後) consists of present-day Niigata Prefecture.

Officially the expressway is referred to as the Tōhoku-Ōdan Expressway Iwaki Niigata Route.

== Overview ==
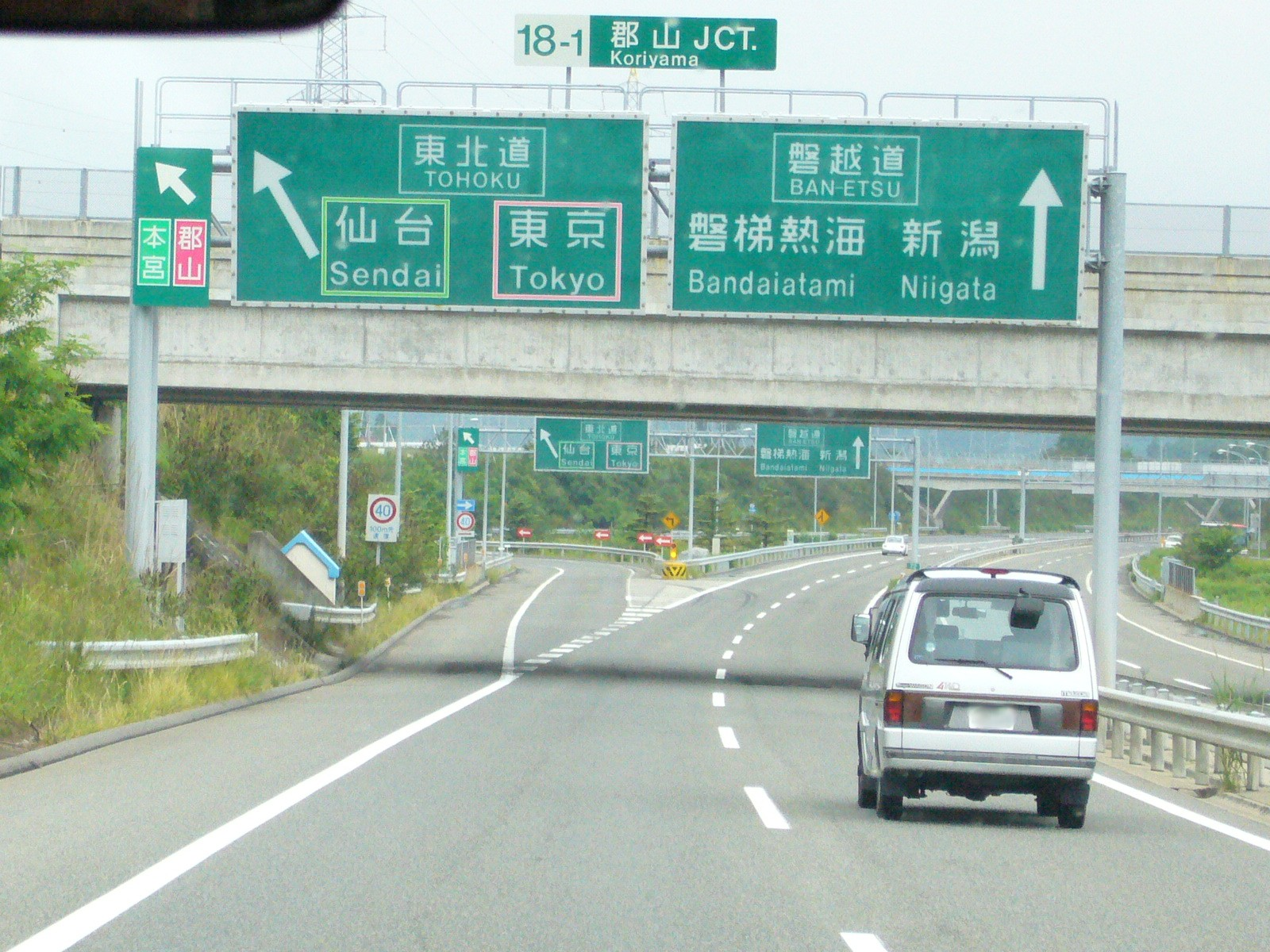
Kōriyama Junction

The route of the expressway connects the coastlines of the Pacific Ocean and the Japan Sea by traversing the mountainous interior of the Tōhoku region.

The expressway commences at a junction with the Jōban Expressway in Iwaki, Fukushima and follows a northwesterly course to the city of Kōriyama, where it intersects with the Tōhoku Expressway. The expressway continues its course through the historic Aizu region, with Mount Bandai viewable to the north and Lake Inawashiro viewable to the south. The route then enters Niigata Prefecture and eventually terminates at a junction in Niigata City with the Hokuriku Expressway and Nihonkai-Tōhoku Expressway.

The route parallels the East Ban'etsu Line and West Ban'etsu Line of East Japan Railway Company and National Route 49 for much of its length.

The first section of the expressway was opened to traffic in 1990 and the entire route was completed in 1997. The route was originally 2 lanes only, one in each direction. However expansion to two lanes in each direction has proceeded gradually over the years. Expansion of the eastern half (between Iwaki Junction and Kōriyama Junction) was completed in 2009.

Using the Ban-etsu and Hokuriku Expressway to travel between the Tōhoku and Kinki regions is shorter and cheaper than using expressways that traverse a route via the greater Tokyo urban area.

All service areas along the route feature restaurants and shops (there are also shops at Gobyakugawa Parking Area). There are 24-hour gas stations at Abukumakōgen Service Area and Bandaisan Service Area. There is a 24-hour FamilyMart convenience store at Aganogawa Service Area (Niigata-bound only). Saiso Parking Area and Miharu Parking Area feature vending machines and toilets, while all other parking areas have only toilets.

== List of interchanges and features ==
- IC - interchange, SIC - smart interchange, JCT - junction, SA - service area, PA - parking area, BS - bus stop, TN - tunnel, BR - bridge

No.	Name	Connections	Dist. from Origin	Dist. from Terminus	Bus Stop	Notes	Speed Limit	Lanes	Location	
(16-1)	Iwaki JCT	Jōban Expressway	0.0	212.7						
(16-1)	Iwaki JCT	Jōban Expressway	0.0	212.7			80 km/h	Four	Iwaki	Fukushima
TN	Gōdo Tunnel		↓	↑		Iwaki-bound 383 m Niigata-bound 373 m	80 km/h	Four	Iwaki	Fukushima
1	Iwaki-Miwa IC	National Route 49; Pref. Route 66 (Onahama Ono Route)	8.8	203.9			80 km/h	Four	Iwaki	Fukushima
TN	Watato Tunnel		↓	↑		Iwaki-bound 1,136 m Niigata-bound 1,131 m	80 km/h	Four	Iwaki	Fukushima
PA	Saiso PA		18.7	194.0			80 km/h	Four	Iwaki	Fukushima
2	Ono IC/JCT	Abukuma Kōgen Road; National Route 349	35.2	177.5	○		80 km/h	Four	Ono	Fukushima
TN	Shinkazakoshi Tunnel		↓	↑		Iwaki-bound - 463 m Niigata-bound - 538 m	80 km/h	Four	Ono	Fukushima
TN	Shinkazakoshi Tunnel		↓	↑		Iwaki-bound - 463 m Niigata-bound - 538 m	80 km/h	Four	Tamura	Fukushima
2-1	Tamura SIC	National Route 349	44.7	168.0		ETC only	80 km/h	Four	Tamura	Fukushima
SA	Abukumakōgen SA		46.8	165.9			80 km/h	Four	Tamura	Fukushima
3	Funehiki-Miharu IC	National Route 288	55.7	157.0			80 km/h	Four	Tamura	Fukushima
PA	Miharu PA		59.5	153.2			80 km/h	Four	Miharu	Fukushima
3-1	Kōriyama-higashi IC	National Route 288	63.7	149.0			80 km/h	Four	Kōriyama	Fukushima
(18-1)	Kōriyama JCT	Tōhoku Expressway	71.4	141.3			80 km/h	Four	Kōriyama	Fukushima
BR	Gohyakugawa Bridge		↓	↑		Length - 170 m	80 km/h	Four	Kōriyama	Fukushima
BR	Gohyakugawa Bridge		↓	↑		Length - 170 m	80 km/h	Four	Motomiya	Fukushima
PA	Gohyakugawa PA		76.5	136.2			80 km/h	Four	Kōriyama	Fukushima
4	Bandaiatami IC	Pref. Route 24 (Nakanosawa Atami Route)	79.6	133.1			80 km/h	Four	Kōriyama	Fukushima
TN	Takatamahigashi Tunnel		↓	↑		Iwaki-bound 1,112 m Niigata-bound 1,122 m	80 km/h	Four	Kōriyama	Fukushima
TN	Takatamanishi Tunnel		↓	↑		Iwaki-bound 1,019 m Niigata-bound 993 m	80 km/h	Four	Kōriyama	Fukushima
TN	Shinnakayama Tunnel		↓	↑		Iwaki-bound 1,786 m Niigata-bound 1,820 m	80 km/h	Four	Kōriyama	Fukushima
TN	Kurateyama Tunnel		↓	↑		Iwaki-bound 1,648 m Niigata-bound 1,669 m	80 km/h	Four	Kōriyama	Fukushima
TN	Kurateyama Tunnel		↓	↑		Iwaki-bound 1,648 m Niigata-bound 1,669 m	80 km/h	Four	Inawashiro	Fukushima
TN	Sekito Tunnel		↓	↑		Iwaki-bound 1,443 m Niigata-bound 1,488 m	80 km/h	Four	Inawashiro	Fukushima
5	Inawashiro Bandaikōgen IC	National Route 115	97.6	115.1			80 km/h	Four	Inawashiro	Fukushima
SA	Bandaisan SA		105.3	107.4			80 km/h	Four	Bandai	Fukushima
6	Bandai Kawahigashi IC	Pref. Route 64 (Aizuwakamatsu Urabandai Route)	111.5	101.2			80 km/h	Four	Aizu- wakamatsu	Fukushima
7	Aizuwakamatsu IC	National Route 121	117.5	95.2			80 km/h	Four	Aizu- wakamatsu	Fukushima
7	Aizuwakamatsu IC	National Route 121	117.5	95.2			70 km/h	Two	Aizu- wakamatsu	Fukushima
7-1 PA	Niitsuru PA/SIC		124.7	88.0		SIC: ETC only	70 km/h	Two	Aizumisato	Fukushima
TN	Nanaori Tunnel		↓	↑		Length - 2,358 m	70 km/h	Two	Aizubange	Fukushima
8	Aizubange IC	National Route 49; National Route 252	132.4	80.3			70 km/h	Two	Aizubange	Fukushima
BR	Tadamigawa Bridge		↓	↑		Length - 310 m	70 km/h	Two	Aizubange	Fukushima
TN	Tabanematsu Tunnel		↓	↑		Length - 1,325 m	70 km/h	Two	Aizubange	Fukushima
TN	Tabanematsu Tunnel		↓	↑		Length - 1,325 m	70 km/h	Two	Nishiaizu	Fukushima
TN	Toyasan Tunnel		↓	↑		Length - 2,600 m	70 km/h	Two	Nishiaizu	Fukushima
TN	Nishiaizu Tunnel		↓	↑		Length - 1,018 m	70 km/h	Two	Nishiaizu	Fukushima
9/PA	Nishiaizu IC/PA	National Route 49; Pref. Route 16 (Kitakata Nishiaizu Route)	143.8	68.9	○		70 km/h	Two	Nishiaizu	Fukushima
TN	Nagasaka Tunnel		↓	↑		Length - 736 m	70 km/h	Two	Nishiaizu	Fukushima
TN	Ryūgadake Tunnel		↓	↑		Length - 3,659 m	70 km/h	Two	Nishiaizu	Fukushima
TN	Kuromoriyama Tunnel		↓	↑		Length - 2,759 m	70 km/h	Two	Nishiaizu	Fukushima
TN	Kuromoriyama Tunnel		↓	↑		Length - 2,759 m	70 km/h	Two	Aga	Niigata
TN	Koide Tunnel		↓	↑		Length - 1,121 m	70 km/h	Two	Aga	Niigata
PA	Kamikawa PA		162.6	50.1			70 km/h	Two	Aga	Niigata
10	Tsugawa IC	Pref. Route 89 (Tsugawa Inter Route)	166.2	46.5	○		70 km/h	Two	Aga	Niigata
TN	Yakiyama Tunnel		↓	↑		Length - 2,997 m	70 km/h	Two	Aga	Niigata
BS	Mikawa Bus Stop		172.8	39.9	○		70 km/h	Two	Aga	Niigata
11	Mikawa IC	Pref. Route 587 (Mikawa Inter Route)	174.0	38.7			70 km/h	Two	Aga	Niigata
TN	Yoshizu Tunnel		↓	↑		Iwaki-bound 906 m Niigata-bound 952 m	70 km/h	Two	Aga	Niigata
TN	Nishiyama Tunnel		↓	↑		Length - 2,402 m	70 km/h	Two	Aga	Niigata
TN	Kumawatari Tunnel		↓	↑		Length - 157 m	70 km/h	Two	Aga	Niigata
SA	Aganogawa SA		181.0	31.7			70 km/h	Two	Aga	Niigata
TN	Komatsu Tunnel		↓	↑		Length - 200 m	70 km/h	Two	Agano	Niigata
TN	Hōshusan Tunnel		↓	↑		Length - 611 m	70 km/h	Two	Agano	Niigata
12	Yasuda IC	Pref. Route 41 (Shirone Yasuda Route)	188.9	23.8	○		70 km/h	Two	Agano	Niigata
12	Yasuda IC	Pref. Route 41 (Shirone Yasuda Route)	188.9	23.8	○		80 km/h	Four	Agano	Niigata
PA	Gosen PA		191.2	21.5			80 km/h	Four	Gosen	Niigata
PA	Gosen PA		191.2	21.5			70 km/h	Two	Gosen	Niigata
13	Niitsu IC	Pref. Route 34 (Niitsu Teishajō Route); National Route 460	198.5	14.2			70 km/h	Two	Akiha-ku, Niigata	Niigata
BS	Kawaguchi Bus Stop		202.2	10.5	○		70 km/h	Two	Akiha-ku, Niigata	Niigata
13-1	Niitsu-nishi SIC	National Route 403	204.5			ETC only Iwaki-bound exit, Niigata-bound entrance only	70 km/h	Two	Akiha-ku, Niigata	Niigata
BS	Sakaya Bus Stop		207.5	5.2	○		70 km/h	Two	Kōnan-ku, Niigata	Niigata
PA	Niigata PA		208.6	4.1					Kōnan-ku, Niigata	Niigata
PA	Niigata PA		208.6	4.1			100 km/h	Four	Kōnan-ku, Niigata	Niigata
(42)	Niigata-Chūō JCT	Hokuriku Expressway; Nihonkai-Tōhoku Expressway	211.9	0.8			100 km/h	Four	Kōnan-ku, Niigata	Niigata
14	Niigata-Chūō IC	Pref. Route 16 (Niigata Kameda Uchino Route); Pref. Route 290 (Sonoki Hitoichi Route)	212.7	0.0			100 km/h	Four	Kōnan-ku, Niigata	Niigata
