= Akai Station =

Railway station in Iwaki, Fukushima Prefecture, Japan

Akai Station 赤井駅
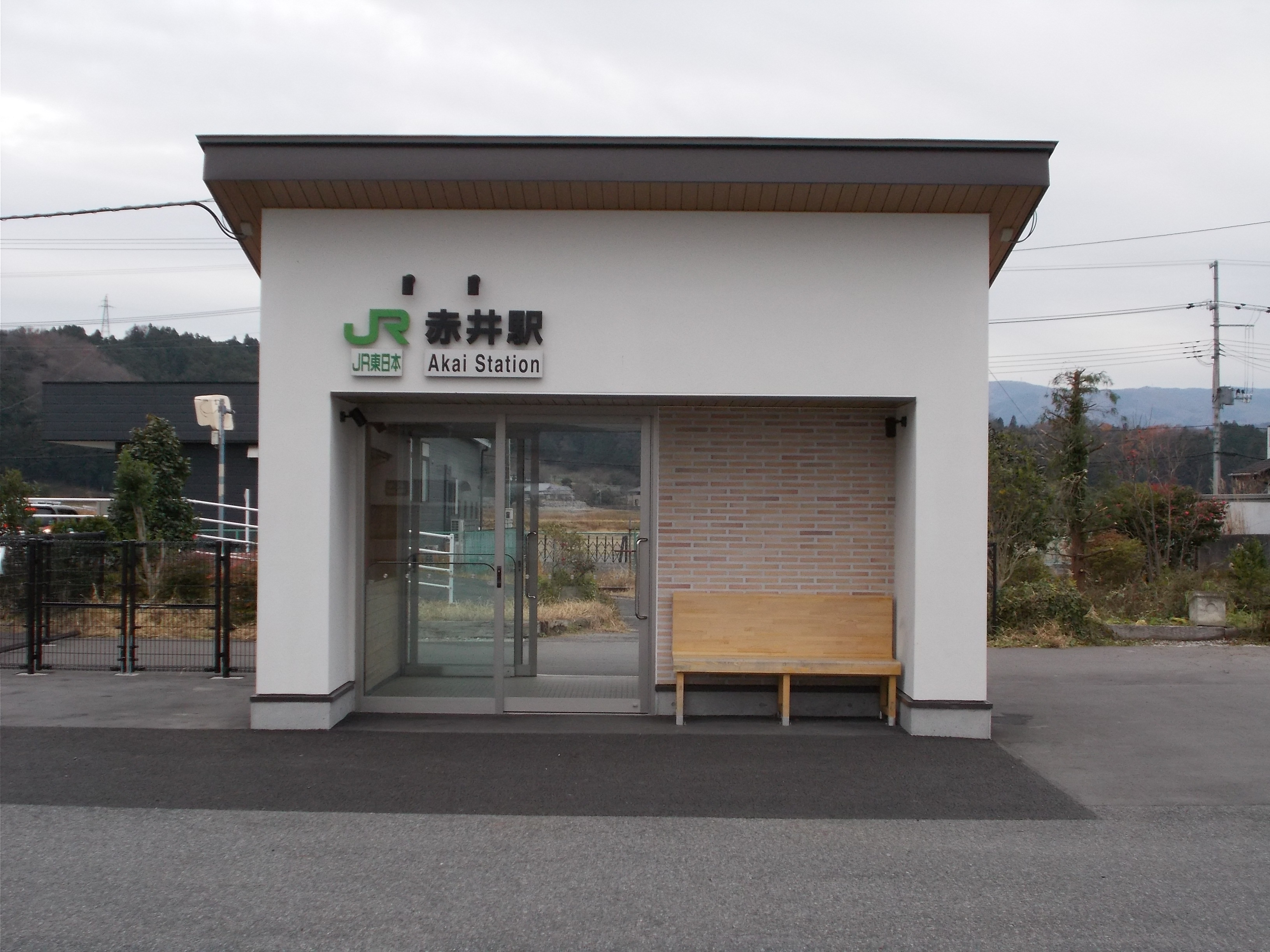
- Akai Station in December 2018

General information
- Location: Taira-Akai Tanaka 8, Iwaki-shi, Fukushima-ken 979-3131; Japan
- Coordinates: 37.0808°N 140.8662°E
- Operator: JR East
- Line: ■ Ban'etsu East Line
- Platforms: 1 island platform

Other information
- Status: Unstaffed
- Website: Official website

History
- Opened: July 10, 1915

Services
Preceding station	JR East	Following station
Ogawagō towards Kōriyama	Ban'etsu East Line Local	Iwaki Terminus
Location
- Location within Fukushima Prefecture Location within Japan

Akai Station (赤井駅, Akai-eki) is a railway station in the city of Iwaki, Fukushima Prefecture, Japan operated by East Japan Railway Company (JR East).

== Lines ==
Akai Station is served by the Ban'etsu East Line, and is located 4.8 rail kilometers from the official starting point of the line at Iwaki.

== Station layout ==
The station has one side platform serving a single bi-directional track. The station is unstaffed.

== History ==
Akai Station opened on July 10, 1915. The station was absorbed into the JR East network upon the privatization of the Japanese National Railways (JNR) on April 1, 1987. A new station building was completed in January 2018.

== Surrounding area ==
- National Route 399
- Natsui River

== See also ==
- List of railway stations in Japan
