= E80 =

E80 can refer to:

- European route E80
- King's Indian Defense, Encyclopaedia of Chess Openings code
- Toyota Corolla (E80), a car
- Abukuma Kōgen Road, route E80 in Japan
