= Abukuma Kōgen Road =

Road in Fukushima Prefecture, Japan

Abukuma Kōgen Road
- あぶくま高原道路 (Abukuma Kōgen Dōro)

Route information
- Maintained by Fukushima Prefecture Road Corporation
- Length: 35.9 km (22.3 mi)
- Existed: 27 March 2001–present

Major junctions
- West end: Yabuki Interchange; Tōhoku Expressway in Yabuki
- East end: Ono Junction; Ban-etsu Expressway in Ono

Location
- Country: Japan

Highway system
- National highways of Japan; Expressways of Japan

The Abukuma Kōgen Road (あぶくま高原道路 Abukuma Kōgen Dōro) is a two-lane toll road in Fukushima Prefecture. It serves as an alternate route between the Tōhoku Expressway and Ban-etsu Expressway through south-central the plains of Fukushima Prefecture. It was also built to serve as a bypass of a proposed location for a new capital of Japan in the aforementioned flat area. The road is managed by the Fukushima Prefecture Road Corporation and is numbered E80 under the Ministry of Land, Infrastructure, Transport and Tourism's "2016 Proposal for Realization of Expressway Numbering."

== Junction list ==
The entire expressway is in Fukushima Prefecture. PA=Parking area, TB=Toll booth

Location	km	mi	Exit	Name	Destinations	Notes
Yabuki	0	0.0	1/TB	Yabuki	Tōhoku Expressway – Fukushima, Tokyo, Utsunomiya, Sendai	Tolls are collected by NEXCO East Japan for distance traveled on the Tōhoku Expressway
Yabuki	0	0.0	1	Yabuki	National Route 4 – Shirakawa, Nasushiobara, Sukagawa, Kōriyama	
Yabuki	3.9	2.4	2	Yabuki-chūō	Unnamed municipal road	
Yabuki	5.4	3.4	-		Fukushima Prefecture Route 106	
Yabuki	6.8	4.2	TB	Yabuki		Tolls are collected by the Fukushima Prefecture Road Corporation
Tamakawa	10.5	6.5	3	Tamakawa	National Route 118 – Kōriyama, Mito, Ibaraki	
Tamakawa	13.6	8.5	4	Fukushima Airport	Unnamed municipal road – Fukushima Airport	
Ishikawa	17.1	10.6	5	Ishikawa-Bobata	Fukushima Prefecture Route 42	
Hirata	21.1	13.1	6	Hirata-nishi	Unnamed village road	
Hirata	24.0	14.9	PA	Yomogita		Closed due to the 2011 Tōhoku earthquake and tsunami
Hirata	27.3	17.0	7	Hirata	National Route 49 – Aizuwakamatsu, Kōriyama, Iwaki, Hitachi, Ibaraki	
Ono	35.9	22.3	8	Ono	National Route 349 – Central Ono, Iwaki, Tamura	
Ono	35.9	22.3	8/TB	Ono	Ban-etsu Expressway – to Tōhoku Expressway, Jōban Expressway, Iwaki, Niigata, Utsunomiya	Tolls are collected by NEXCO East Japan for distance traveled on the Ban-etsu Expressway
1.000 mi = 1.609 km; 1.000 km = 0.621 mi: Closed/former; Tolled
