= Ono, Fukushima =

Ono 小野町
- Town
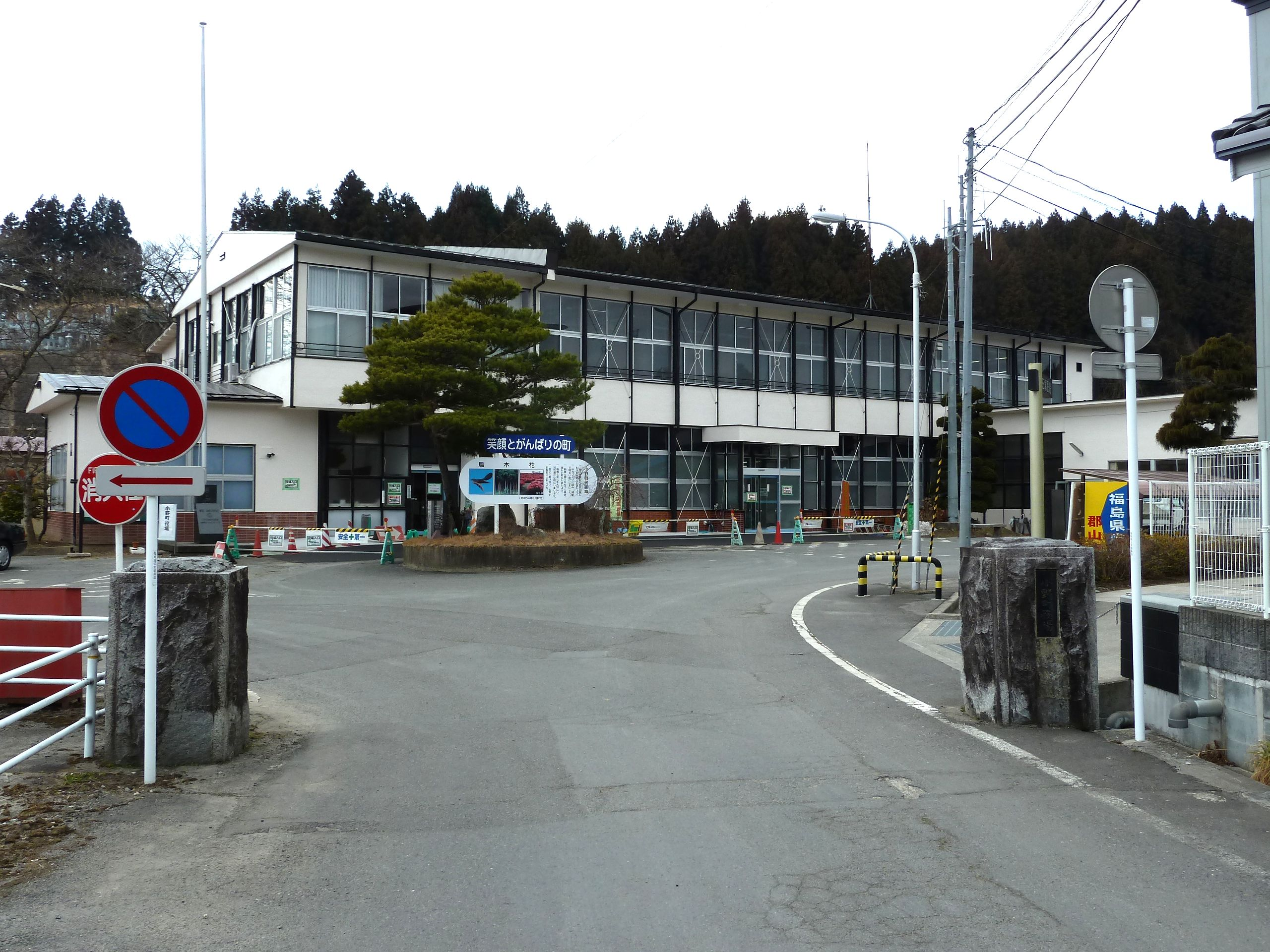
- Ono Town Hall

- Flag Seal

- Location of Ono in Fukushima Prefecture

- Coordinates: 37°17′13″N 140°37′35″E
- Country: Japan
- Region: Tōhoku
- Prefecture: Fukushima
- District: Tamura

Area
  - Total: 125.11 km^{2} (48.31 sq mi)

Population (March 2020)
  - Total: 9,636
  - Density: 77.02/km^{2} (199.5/sq mi)
- Time zone: UTC+9 (Japan Standard Time)
- Phone number: 0247-72-2111
- Address: Ononiimachi Tatemawari 92, Ono-machi, Tamura District, Fukushima Prefecture 963-3401
- Climate: Cfa
- Website: Official website
- Symbols
- Bird: Common cuckoo
- Flower: Azalea
- Tree: Cryptomeria

Ono (小野町, Ono-machi) is a town located in Fukushima Prefecture, Japan. As of 1 March 2020, the town had an estimated population of 10,416 in 3464 households, and a population density of 77 persons per km^{2}. The total area of the town is 125.11 square kilometres (48.31 sq mi). The town is known locally for the "thousand cherry trees" which line the banks of the Natsui River. It is also one of the purported birthplaces of Heian period poet Ono no Komachi.

== Geography ==
Ono is located in north-central Fukushima prefecture in the middle of Abukuma Highland, in eastern Nakadōri. It is surrounded by mountains over 700 meters above sea level. The Natsui River flows in the center of the town. Most of the town is within the borders of the Abukuma Kogen Chubu Prefectural Natural Park.

- Rivers: Natsui River

=== Neighboring municipalities ===
- Fukushima Prefecture
  - Hirata
  - Iwaki
  - Kōriyama
  - Tamura

=== Climate ===
Ono has a humid continental climate (Köppen Cfa) characterized by mild summers and cold winters with heavy snowfall. The average annual temperature in Ono is 10.7 °C. The average annual rainfall is 1390 mm with September as the wettest month. The temperatures are highest on average in August, at around 23.0 °C, and lowest in January, at around -0.5 °C.

Climate data for Ono (1991−2020 normals, extremes 1976−present)
Month	Jan	Feb	Mar	Apr	May	Jun	Jul	Aug	Sep	Oct	Nov	Dec	Year
Record high °C (°F)	14.6 (58.3)	19.3 (66.7)	23.1 (73.6)	28.9 (84.0)	33.2 (91.8)	34.8 (94.6)	35.8 (96.4)	36.0 (96.8)	33.7 (92.7)	28.3 (82.9)	24.1 (75.4)	18.0 (64.4)	36.0 (96.8)
Mean daily maximum °C (°F)	3.9 (39.0)	4.9 (40.8)	8.9 (48.0)	15.3 (59.5)	20.8 (69.4)	23.9 (75.0)	27.5 (81.5)	28.7 (83.7)	24.4 (75.9)	18.5 (65.3)	12.8 (55.0)	6.8 (44.2)	16.4 (61.4)
Daily mean °C (°F)	−0.7 (30.7)	−0.1 (31.8)	3.2 (37.8)	8.8 (47.8)	14.3 (57.7)	18.2 (64.8)	22.2 (72.0)	23.1 (73.6)	19.1 (66.4)	12.9 (55.2)	6.8 (44.2)	1.8 (35.2)	10.8 (51.4)
Mean daily minimum °C (°F)	−4.8 (23.4)	−4.6 (23.7)	−1.9 (28.6)	2.7 (36.9)	8.3 (46.9)	13.6 (56.5)	18.2 (64.8)	19.0 (66.2)	14.9 (58.8)	8.1 (46.6)	1.5 (34.7)	−2.6 (27.3)	6.0 (42.9)
Record low °C (°F)	−17.1 (1.2)	−17.1 (1.2)	−18.0 (−0.4)	−8.5 (16.7)	−1.8 (28.8)	2.9 (37.2)	6.9 (44.4)	7.8 (46.0)	1.4 (34.5)	−3.6 (25.5)	−7.7 (18.1)	−18.8 (−1.8)	−18.8 (−1.8)
Average precipitation mm (inches)	43.6 (1.72)	36.4 (1.43)	76.0 (2.99)	91.2 (3.59)	97.7 (3.85)	117.3 (4.62)	175.5 (6.91)	145.8 (5.74)	197.5 (7.78)	137.8 (5.43)	60.8 (2.39)	41.2 (1.62)	1,220.6 (48.06)
Average precipitation days (≥ 1.0 mm)	6.8	5.9	9.2	10.0	10.3	12.0	13.8	11.0	11.8	9.6	7.2	6.2	113.8
Mean monthly sunshine hours	156.5	162.2	188.3	193.5	197.8	143.6	146.0	167.9	131.4	136.3	150.2	151.8	1,933.3
Source: Japan Meteorological Agency

== Demographics ==
Per Japanese census data, the population of Ono has declined steadily over the past 60 years.

Historical population
Year	Pop.	±%
1920	11,423	—
1930	13,181	+15.4%
1940	13,547	+2.8%
1950	17,198	+27.0%
1960	17,441	+1.4%
1970	15,498	−11.1%
1980	14,085	−9.1%
1990	13,341	−5.3%
2000	12,555	−5.9%
2010	11,208	−10.7%
2020	9,471	−15.5%

== History ==
The area of present-day Ono was part of ancient Mutsu Province. After the Meiji Restoration it was organized as part of Nakadōri region of Iwaki Province. The villages of Iitoyo, Natsui, and Ononiimachi were established with the formation of the modern municipalities system on April 1, 1889. Ononiimachi was raised to town status on July 1, 1896. On February 1, 1955, it merged with Iitoyo and Natsui to form the town of Ono.

== Economy ==
The economy of Ono is primarily mixed agricultural and light manufacturing.

== Education ==
Ono has one public elementary schools and one public junior high school operated by the town government, and one public high school operated by the Fukushima Board of Education.

== Transportation ==
=== Railway ===
JR East – Ban'etsu East Line

- Natsui – Ononiimachi

=== Highway ===
- Ban-etsu Expressway
- Abukuma Kōgen Road
- National Route 349

== Local attractions ==
- Rika-chan Castle, a two-story museum, store and small-scale doll factory for the Licca-chan line of dolls.
