= Tamura, Fukushima =

Tamura 田村市
- City
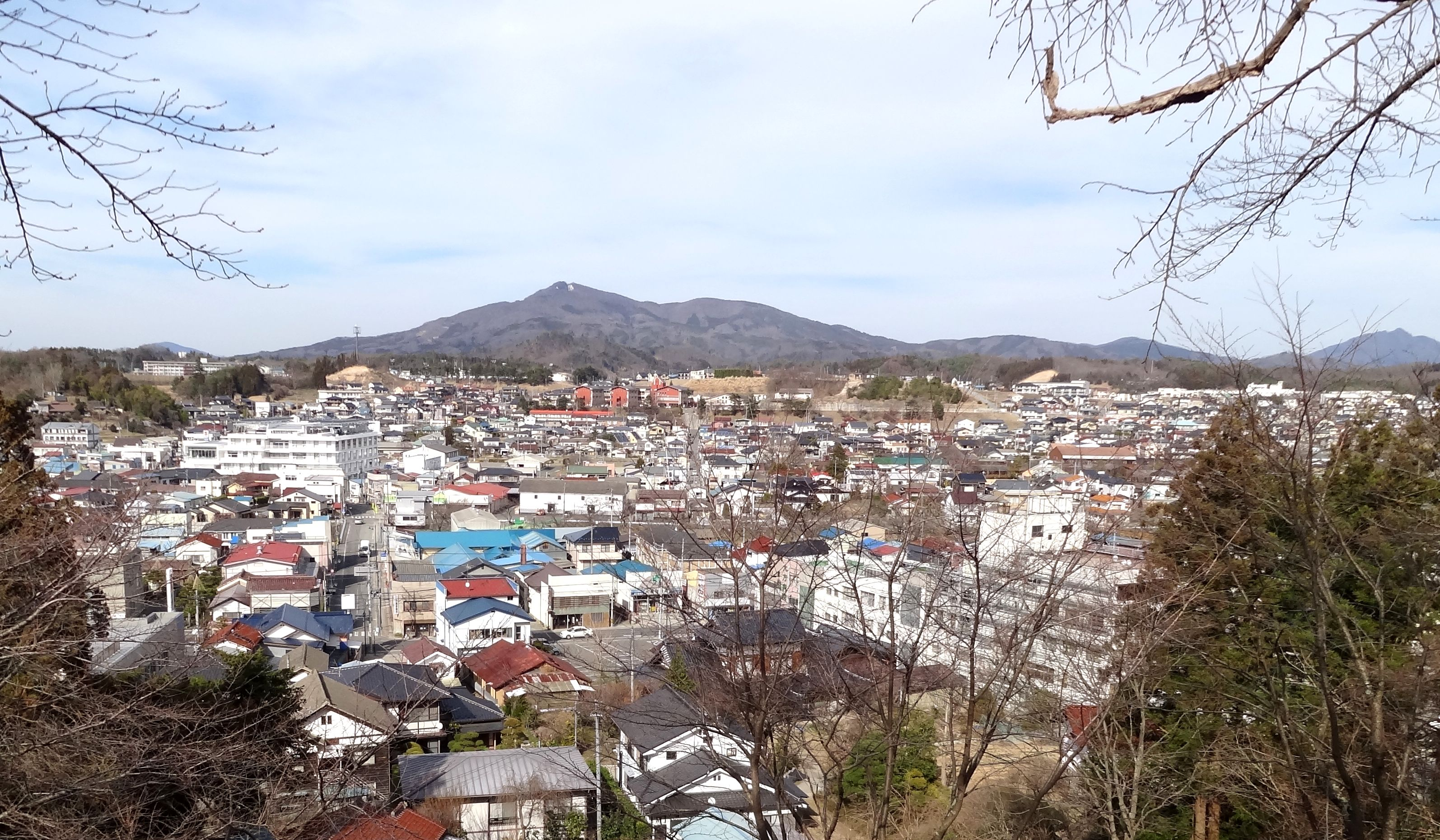
- Central Tamura (2015)

- Flag Seal

- Location of Tamura in Fukushima Prefecture

- Coordinates: 37°26′N 140°34′E
- Country: Japan
- Region: Tōhoku
- Prefecture: Fukushima

Government
  - Mayor: Takashi Shiraishi

Area
  - Total: 458.30 km^{2} (176.95 sq mi)

Population (March 2020)
  - Total: 35,702
  - Density: 77.901/km^{2} (201.76/sq mi)
- Time zone: UTC+9 (Japan Standard Time)
- Phone number: 0247-82-1111
- Address: 76 Funehikimachi Funehiki aza hatazoe, Tamura-shi, Fukushima-ken 963-4393
- Climate: Cfa
- Website: Official website
- Symbols
- Bird: Japanese bush warbler
- Flower: Azalea
- Tree: Oak

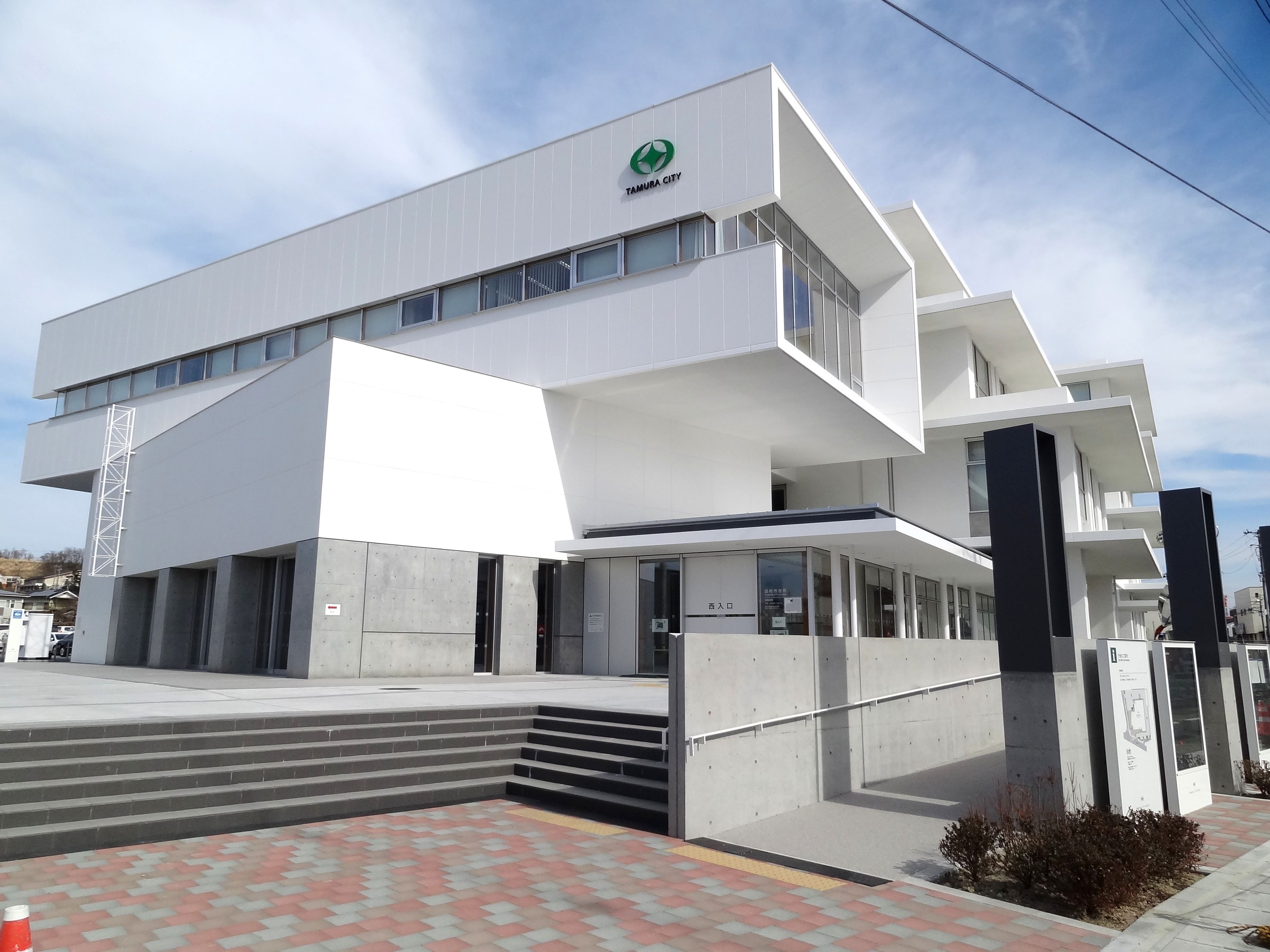
Tamura City Hall

Tamura (田村市, Tamura-shi) is a city located in Fukushima Prefecture, Japan. As of 1 March 2020, the city had an estimated population of 35,702 in 12,821 households and a population density of 78 persons per km². The total area of the city was 458.30 square kilometres (176.95 sq mi).

== Geography ==
Tamura is located in east-central Fukushima Prefecture, in the easternmost portion of the Nakadōri region of then prefecture. The town is located in a hilly region of the Abukuma Mountains.

=== Neighboring municipalities ===
- Fukushima Prefecture
  - Iwaki
  - Katsurao
  - Kawauchi
  - Kōriyama
  - Miharu
  - Namie
  - Nihonmatsu
  - Ōkuma
  - Ono

== Climate ==
Tamura has a humid subtropical climate (Köppen Cfa) characterized by mild summers and cold winters with heavy snowfall. The average annual temperature in Tamura is 10.4 °C. The average annual rainfall is 1368 mm with September as the wettest month. The temperatures are highest on average in August, at around 23.1 °C, and lowest in January, at around -0.1 °C.

Climate data for Funehiki, Tamura (1991–2020 normals, extremes 1976–present)
| Month | Jan | Feb | Mar | Apr | May | Jun | Jul | Aug | Sep | Oct | Nov | Dec | Year |
|---|---|---|---|---|---|---|---|---|---|---|---|---|---|
| Record high °C (°F) | 13.4 (56.1) | 18.6 (65.5) | 21.9 (71.4) | 29.8 (85.6) | 32.8 (91.0) | 33.1 (91.6) | 36.1 (97.0) | 35.7 (96.3) | 35.4 (95.7) | 28.4 (83.1) | 23.7 (74.7) | 18.1 (64.6) | 36.1 (97.0) |
| Mean daily maximum °C (°F) | 3.4 (38.1) | 4.5 (40.1) | 8.5 (47.3) | 15.1 (59.2) | 20.7 (69.3) | 23.7 (74.7) | 27.0 (80.6) | 28.3 (82.9) | 24.0 (75.2) | 18.1 (64.6) | 12.4 (54.3) | 6.4 (43.5) | 16.0 (60.8) |
| Daily mean °C (°F) | −0.5 (31.1) | 0.0 (32.0) | 3.3 (37.9) | 9.2 (48.6) | 14.6 (58.3) | 18.4 (65.1) | 22.2 (72.0) | 23.1 (73.6) | 19.1 (66.4) | 13.1 (55.6) | 7.2 (45.0) | 2.1 (35.8) | 11.0 (51.8) |
| Mean daily minimum °C (°F) | −4.4 (24.1) | −4.4 (24.1) | −1.5 (29.3) | 3.4 (38.1) | 8.9 (48.0) | 13.9 (57.0) | 18.4 (65.1) | 19.2 (66.6) | 15.1 (59.2) | 8.5 (47.3) | 2.2 (36.0) | −2.0 (28.4) | 6.4 (43.5) |
| Record low °C (°F) | −17.4 (0.7) | −15.0 (5.0) | −15.3 (4.5) | −7.2 (19.0) | −0.6 (30.9) | 3.8 (38.8) | 7.6 (45.7) | 9.1 (48.4) | 3.1 (37.6) | −2.7 (27.1) | −6.5 (20.3) | −15.4 (4.3) | −17.4 (0.7) |
| Average precipitation mm (inches) | 41.7 (1.64) | 33.7 (1.33) | 71.5 (2.81) | 84.0 (3.31) | 90.6 (3.57) | 118.4 (4.66) | 181.6 (7.15) | 149.4 (5.88) | 167.4 (6.59) | 141.3 (5.56) | 60.9 (2.40) | 40.1 (1.58) | 1,180.5 (46.48) |
| Average precipitation days (≥ 1.0 mm) | 6.6 | 5.9 | 9.2 | 9.4 | 9.7 | 11.3 | 13.8 | 11.0 | 11.5 | 9.4 | 6.7 | 6.7 | 111.1 |
| Mean monthly sunshine hours | 156.9 | 170.0 | 185.9 | 189.4 | 195.5 | 149.8 | 146.7 | 172.8 | 132.5 | 145.1 | 140.0 | 144.2 | 1,928.9 |
Source: Japan Meteorological Agency (1991–2020 normals, extremes 1976–present)

== Demographics ==
Per Japanese census data, the population of Tamura has declined steadily over the past 60 years.

Historical population
| Year | Pop. | ±% |
|---|---|---|
| 1960 | 58,820 | — |
| 1970 | 52,926 | −10.0% |
| 1980 | 48,932 | −7.5% |
| 1990 | 46,758 | −4.4% |
| 2000 | 45,054 | −3.6% |
| 2010 | 40,422 | −10.3% |
| 2020 | 35,169 | −13.0% |

== History ==
The area of present-day Tamura was part of ancient Mutsu Province. Much of the area was part of Miharu Domain under the Edo period Tokugawa shogunate. After the Meiji Restoration, the area was organized as part of Tamura District in Iwaki Province. The villages of Miyakoji, Tokiwa, Katasone, Takine, and Ōgoe were established with the creation of the modern municipalities system on April 1, 1889. Tokiwa was elevated to town status on July 1, 1898, and the village of Katasone became the town of Funehiki on April 1, 1934. Takine was elevated to town status of April 1, 1940 followed by Ōgoe on February 8, 1942. The city of Tamura was established on March 1, 2005, from the merger of these four towns and one village.

=== Evacuation after the Fukushima Daiichi Nuclear Disaster ===
After the Fukushima Daiichi Nuclear Disaster on 11 March 2011, the area containing the former village of Miyakoji was evacuated. On 1 April 2012 residents were allowed to return during daytime hours as decontamination work progressed. The evacuation order was lifted on 1 April 2014. However, doubts remain as to the effectiveness of the radiation decontamination efforts.

== Government ==
Tamura has a mayor-council form of government with a directly elected mayor and a unicameral city legislature of 20 members. Tamura, together with Tamura District contribute two members to the Fukushima Prefectural Assembly. In terms of national politics, the city is part of Fukushima 3rd district of the lower house of the Diet of Japan.

== Economy ==
The economy of Tamura is primarily agricultural. Rice, beef and dairy cattle, and vegetable production predominates. The area is also known for its bottled mineral water and sake rice wine.

== Education ==
As of 2023, Tamura has eight public elementary schools and seven junior high schools operated by the Tamura City Board of Education. There is also one high school operated by the Fukushima Prefecture Board of Education.

- Fukushima Prefectural Funehiki High School

== Transportation ==
=== Railway ===
- JR East – Ban'etsu East Line
  - Kanmata - Sugaya - Ōgoe - Iwaki-Tokiwa - Funehiki - Kanameta

=== Highway ===
- Ban-etsu Expressway
- National Route 288
- National Route 349
- National Route 399

== International relations ==
- Mansfield, Ohio, United States, since October 21, 2000

== Local attractions ==
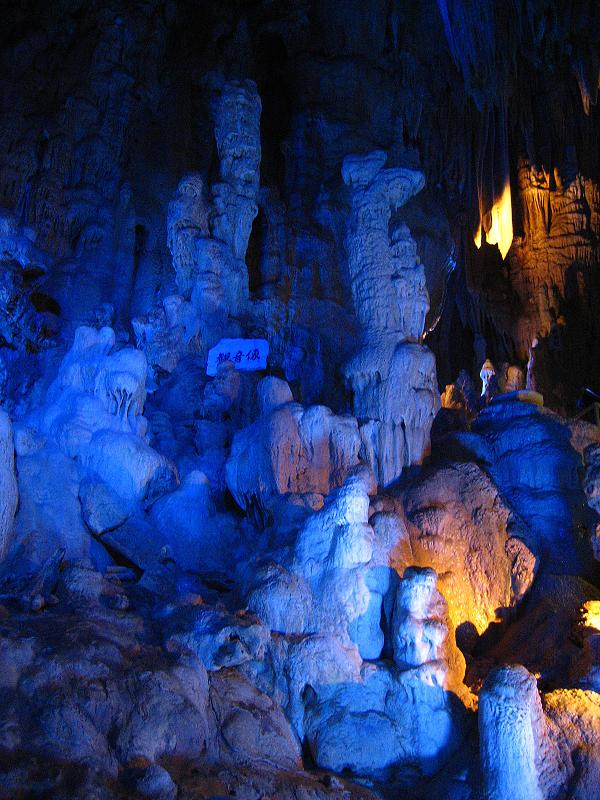
Abukuma Cave

- Abukuma Limestone Caves
- Hoshi no Mura ("Village of Stars") Observatory
- Ohtakadoyayama Transmitter is an LF-time signal transmitter in Miyakoji-machi. It is used for transmitting the time signal JJY on 40 kHz. It uses as transmission antenna a 250-metre-tall (820 ft) guyed mast with an umbrella antenna, which is insulated against ground.
- Okaburaya Shrine

== Noted people from Tamura ==
- Hiroyuki Arai, politician
- Kōichirō Genba, politician
