= Ban'etsu East Line =

Railway line in Fukushima Prefecture, Japan

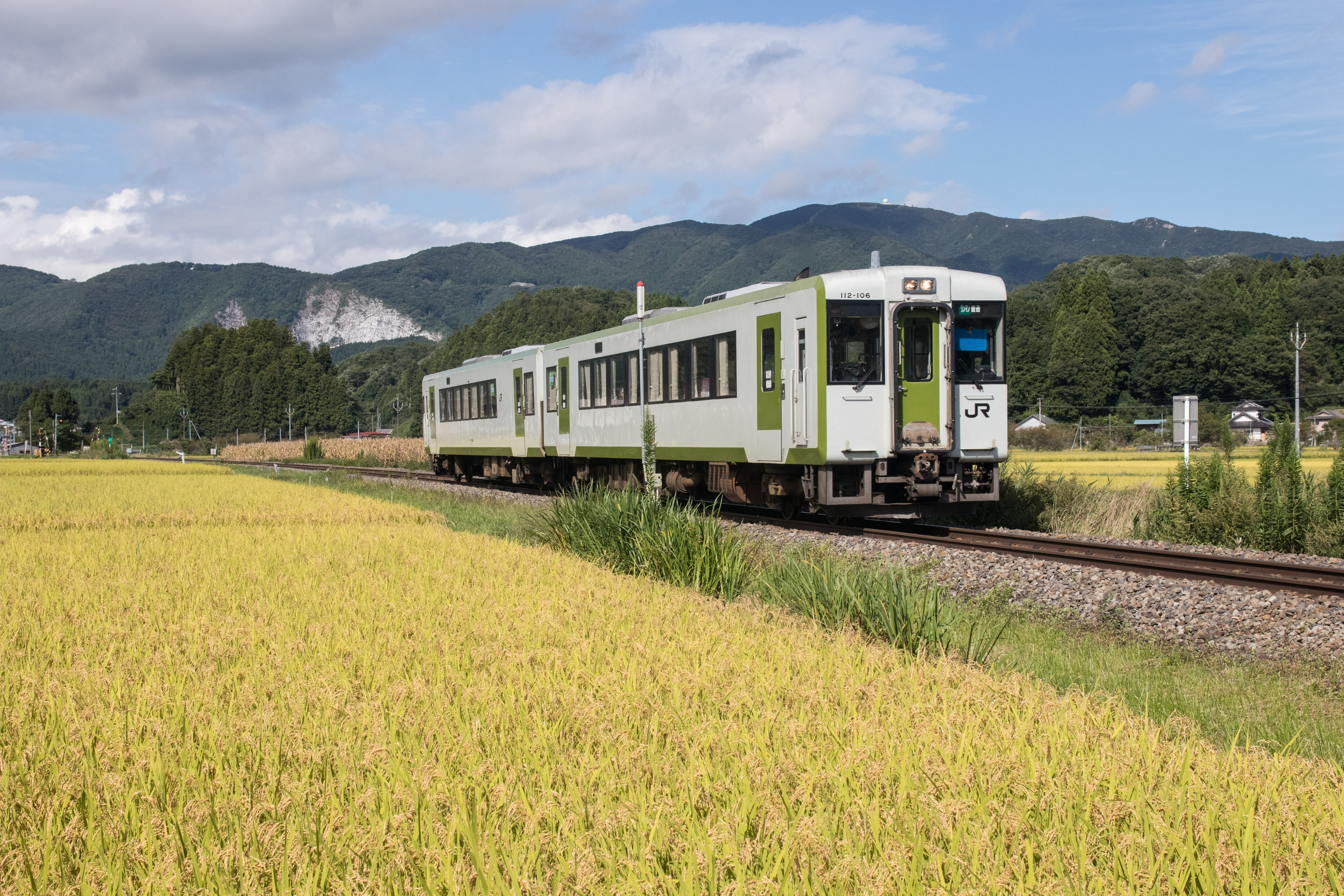
- A KiHa 110 series DMU near Kanmata Station, September 2018

Overview
- Native name: 磐越東線
- Status: In operation
- Owner: JR East
- Locale: Fukushima Prefecture
- Termini: Iwaki; Kōriyama
- Stations: 16

Service
- Type: Heavy rail
- Operator: JR East
- Depot: Kōriyama
- Rolling stock: KiHa 110 series DMU

History
- Opened: 1915; 111 years ago

Technical
- Line length: 85.6 km (53.2 mi)
- Num of tracks: Entire line single tracked
- Character: Rural
- Track gauge: 1,067 mm (3 ft 6 in)
- Electrification: None
- Operating speed: 100 km/h (62 mph)
Route map

The Ban'etsu East Line (磐越東線, Ban'etsu-tō-sen) is a railway line in Fukushima Prefecture, Japan operated by East Japan Railway Company (JR East). It connects Iwaki Station in Iwaki and Kōriyama Station in Kōriyama. The name "Ban'etsu" is taken from the first characters of the names of the ancient provinces of Iwaki (磐城) and Echigo (越後), which the Ban'etsu East and Ban'etsu West lines connect. "Tō" (東) means "east" in Japanese.

The line's nickname is the Yūyū Abukuma Line (ゆうゆうあぶくまライン), taken from the Abukuma River that flows nearby.

A Ban'etsu East Line train arriving at Mōgi Station, 2017.

== Service ==
All trains are operated as local services in 2-, 3-, or 5-car formations. Service between Kōriyama and Ononiimachi is provided once every 30 minutes to two hours, but between Ononiimachi and Iwaki, there is a period of five hours where no trains operate. One reason for the few continuous services between Iwaki and Kōriyama is the opening of the parallel Ban-etsu Expressway in 1995; as a result, most long distance passengers use highway bus services.

The last express service, Iwaki, stopped running in 1982. During peak holiday periods such as Golden Week, Obon, and New Year, the rapid Abukuma makes a single round trip with a 2-car train.

== Station list ==
- All stations are located in Fukushima Prefecture.
- Trains can pass one another at stations marked "◇", "∨", or "∧". Trains cannot pass at stations marked "｜".

Station	Japanese	Distance (km)		Rapid Abukuma	Transfers		Location
Station	Japanese	Between stations	Total	Rapid Abukuma	Transfers		Location
Iwaki	いわき	-	0.0	●	■ Jōban Line	∨	Iwaki
Akai	赤井	4.8	4.8	｜		｜	Iwaki
Ogawagō	小川郷	5.5	10.3	●		◇	Iwaki
Eda	江田	8.0	18.3	｜		｜	Iwaki
Kawamae	川前	8.0	26.3	｜		◇	Iwaki
Natsui	夏井	10.4	36.7	｜		｜	Ono, Tamura District
Ononiimachi	小野新町	3.4	40.1	●		◇	Ono, Tamura District
Kanmata	神俣	6.5	46.6	●		◇	Tamura
Sugaya	菅谷	3.3	49.9	｜		｜	Tamura
Ōgoe	大越	4.4	54.3	●		◇	Tamura
Iwaki-Tokiwa	磐城常葉	4.4	58.7	｜		◇	Tamura
Funehiki	船引	3.8	62.5	●		◇	Tamura
Kanameta	要田	7.0	69.5	｜		◇	Tamura
Miharu	三春	4.2	73.7	●		◇	Miharu, Tamura District
Mōgi	舞木	6.1	79.8	｜		◇	Kōriyama
Kōriyama	郡山	5.8	85.6	●	Tōhoku Shinkansen ■ Tōhoku Main Line ■ Ban'etsu West Line Yamagata Shinkansen ■ Suigun Line (Note: Although the official start of the Suigun Line is Asakanagamori, all trains run through to/from Kōriyama.)	∧	Kōriyama

== Rolling stock ==
As of February 2009, the following rolling stock is used on the East Ban'etsu Line.

- KiHa 110 series DMUs

== History ==
The line was planned by the Railway Construction Act in 1892. The Japanese Government Railways opened the first section as the Heigun West Line (平郡西線) between Koriyama and Miharu in 1914. The Iwaki - Ogawagō opened in 1915 as the Heigun East Line (平郡東線), the same year Miharu - Ononiimachi section opened. When the two sections were connected in 1917, the line became the Ban'etsu East Line.

Freight services ceased in 1987.
