= Okaburaya Shrine =

Shinto shrine in Fukushima, Japan

Coordinates: 37°26′18″N 140°34′57″E

- 大鏑矢神社

Religion
- Affiliation: Shinto
- Deity: Takamimusubi, Ōkaburaya no Kami, Sakanoue no Tamuramaro
- Type: Gō-sha

Location
- Location: 6 Chome-1 Funehikimachi Tobudai, Tamura, Fukushima 963-4317
- Country: Japan
- Interactive map of Okaburaya Shrine

Ōkaburaya Shrine (大鏑矢神社, Ōkaburaya jinja) is a Shinto shrine located in Tamura, Fukushima Prefecture, Japan. It enshrines the kami Takamimusubi (高皇産霊神), Ōkaburaya no kami (大鏑矢神), and Sakanoue Tamuramaro no mikoto (坂之上田村麿命). Its main annual festival is held on November 1.

== See also ==
- List of Shinto shrines in Japan
