= Miharu Station =

Railway station in Tamura, Fukushima Prefecture, Japan

Miharu Station 三春駅
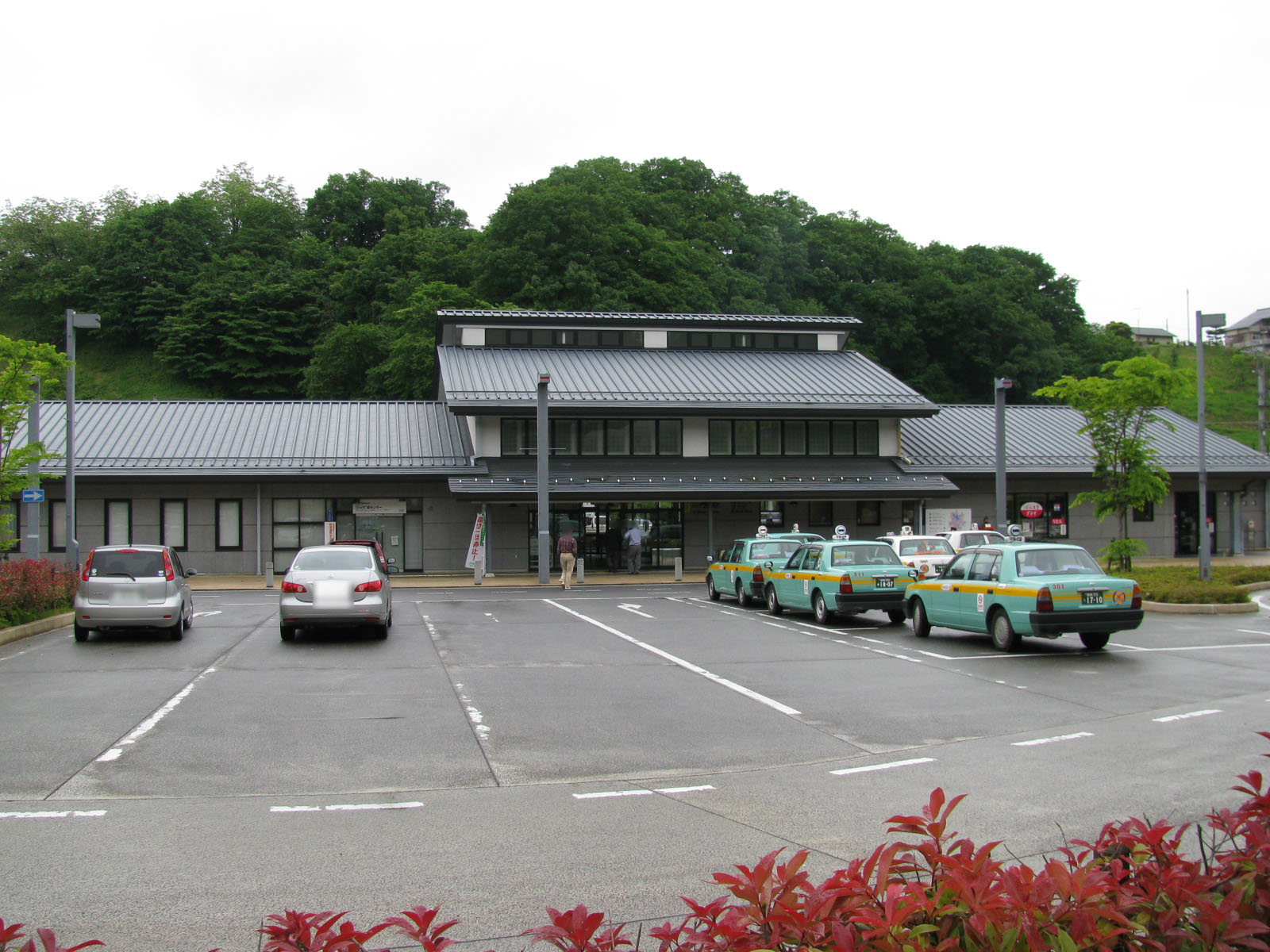
- Miharu Station in May 2008

General information
- Location: Hirasawa, Miharu-machi, Tamura-gun, Fukushima-ken 963-7771; Japan
- Coordinates: 37.4497°N 140.4794°E
- Operator: JR East
- Line: ■ Ban'etsu East Line
- Distance: 73.7 km from Iwaki
- Platforms: 1 island platform

Other information
- Status: Staffed (Midori no Madoguchi )
- Website: Official website

History
- Opened: July 21, 1914

Passengers
- FY 2018: 870 daily

Services
Preceding station	JR East	Following station
Kōriyama Terminus	Ban'etsu East Line Rapid Abukuma	Funehiki towards Iwaki
Mōgi towards Kōriyama	Ban'etsu East Line Local	Kanameta towards Iwaki
Location
- Location within Fukushima Prefecture Location within Japan

Miharu Station (三春駅, Miharu-eki) is a railway station in the town of Miharu, Tamura District, Fukushima Prefecture, Japan, operated by East Japan Railway Company (JR East).

== Lines ==
Miharu Station is served by the Ban'etsu East Line, and is located 73.7 rail kilometers from the official starting point of the line at Iwaki.

== Station layout ==
The station has a single island platform connected to the station building by an underground passage. The station has a Midori no Madoguchi staffed ticket office.

=== Platforms ===
1	■ Ban'etsu East Line	for Funahiki, Ononiimachi and Iwaki
2	■ Ban'etsu East Line	for Kōriyama

== History ==
Miharu Station opened on July 21, 1914. The station was absorbed into the JR East network upon the privatization of the Japanese National Railways (JNR) on April 1, 1987.

== Passenger statistics ==
In fiscal 2018, the station was used by an average of 870 passengers daily (boarding passengers only).

== Surrounding area ==
- Miharu Town Hall
- Miharu Post Office

== See also ==
- List of railway stations in Japan
