= Ononiimachi Station =

Railway station in Ono, Fukushima Prefecture, Japan

Ononiimachi Station 小野新町駅
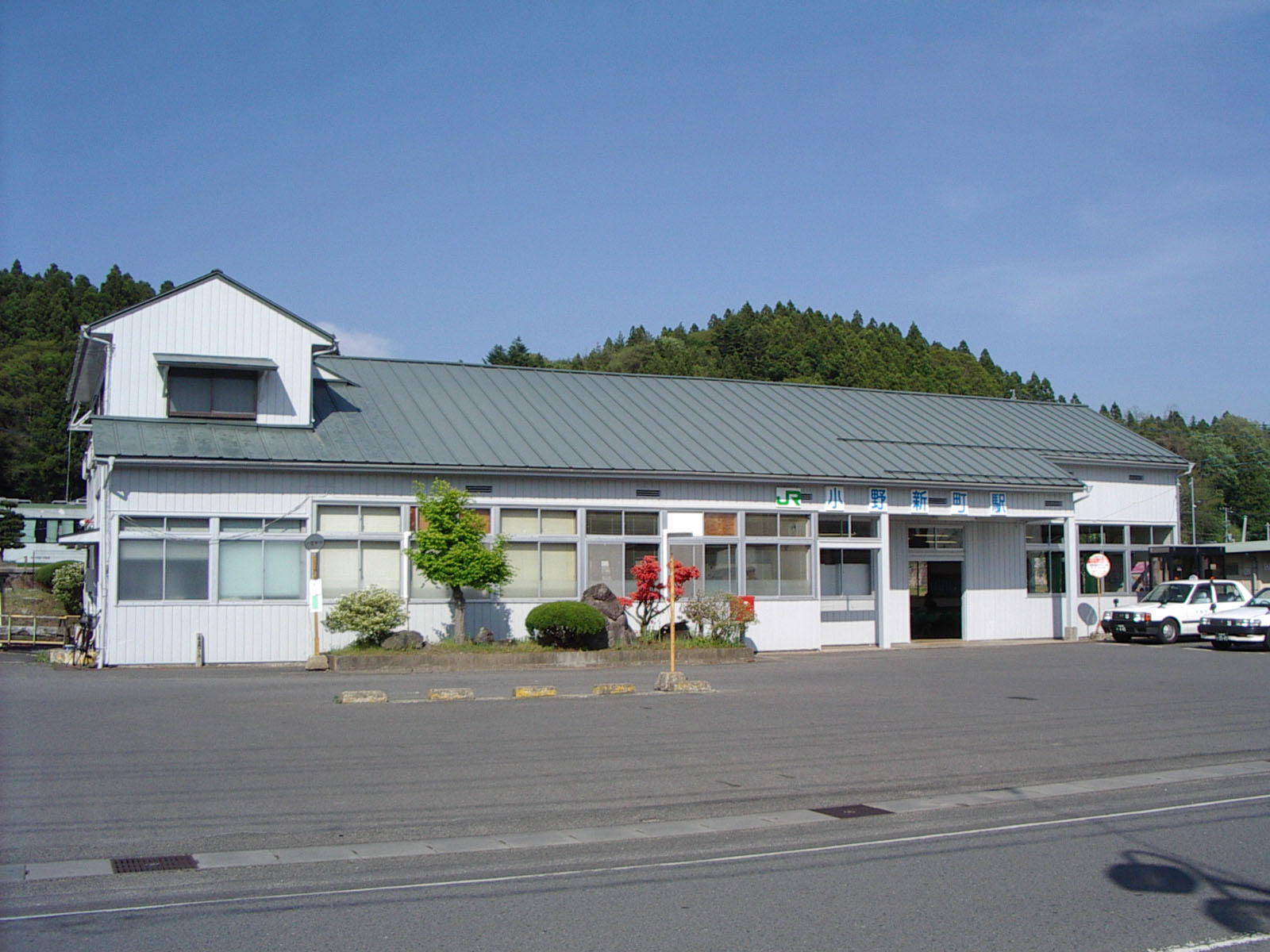
- Ononiimachi Station in August 2005

General information
- Location: Hiratate Yatsuzaku 10, Ono-machi, Tamura-gun, Fukushima-ken 963-3402; Japan
- Coordinates: 37.2759°N 140.6367°E
- Operator: JR East
- Line: ■ Ban'etsu East Line
- Distance: 40.1 km from Iwaki
- Platforms: 1 island platform

Other information
- Status: Staffed (Midori no Madoguchi)
- Website: Official website

History
- Opened: March 21, 1915

Passengers
- FY 2018: 390 daily

Services
Preceding station	JR East	Following station
Kanmata towards Kōriyama	Ban'etsu East Line Rapid Abukuma	Ogawagō towards Iwaki
Kanmata towards Kōriyama	Ban'etsu East Line Local	Natsui towards Iwaki
Location
- Location within Fukushima Prefecture Location within Japan

Ononiimachi Station (小野新町駅, Ononiimachi-eki) is a railway station in the town of Ono, Tamura District, Fukushima Prefecture, Japan operated by East Japan Railway Company (JR East).

== Lines ==
Ononiimachi Station is served by the Ban'etsu East Line, and is located 40.1 rail kilometers from the official starting point of the line at Iwaki Station.

== Station layout ==
The station has a single island platform connected to the station building by an underground passage. The station has a Midori no Madoguchi staffed ticket office.

=== Platforms ===
1	■ Ban'etsu East Line	for Miharu and Kōriyama
2	■ Ban'etsu East Line	for Iwaki

== History ==
Ononiimachi Station opened on March 21, 1915. The station was absorbed into the JR East network upon the privatization of the Japanese National Railways (JNR) on April 1, 1987.

== Passenger statistics ==
In fiscal 2018, the station was used by an average of 390 passengers daily (boarding passengers only).

== Surrounding area ==
- National Route 349
- Ono Town Hall
- Ono Niimachi Post Office

== See also ==
- List of railway stations in Japan
