= Japan National Route 288 =

National highway in Japan

National Route 288
- 国道288号

Route information
- Length: 68.3 km (42.4 mi)

Location
- Country: Japan

Highway system
- National highways of Japan; Expressways of Japan
| ← National Route 287 | → National Route 289 |

National Route 288 is a national highway of Japan, connecting Kōriyama, Fukushima and Futaba, Fukushima in Japan, with a total length of 68.3 km (42.44 mi).
