= Iwaki Station (Fukushima) =

Railway station in Iwaki, Fukushima Prefecture, Japan

Iwaki Station いわき駅
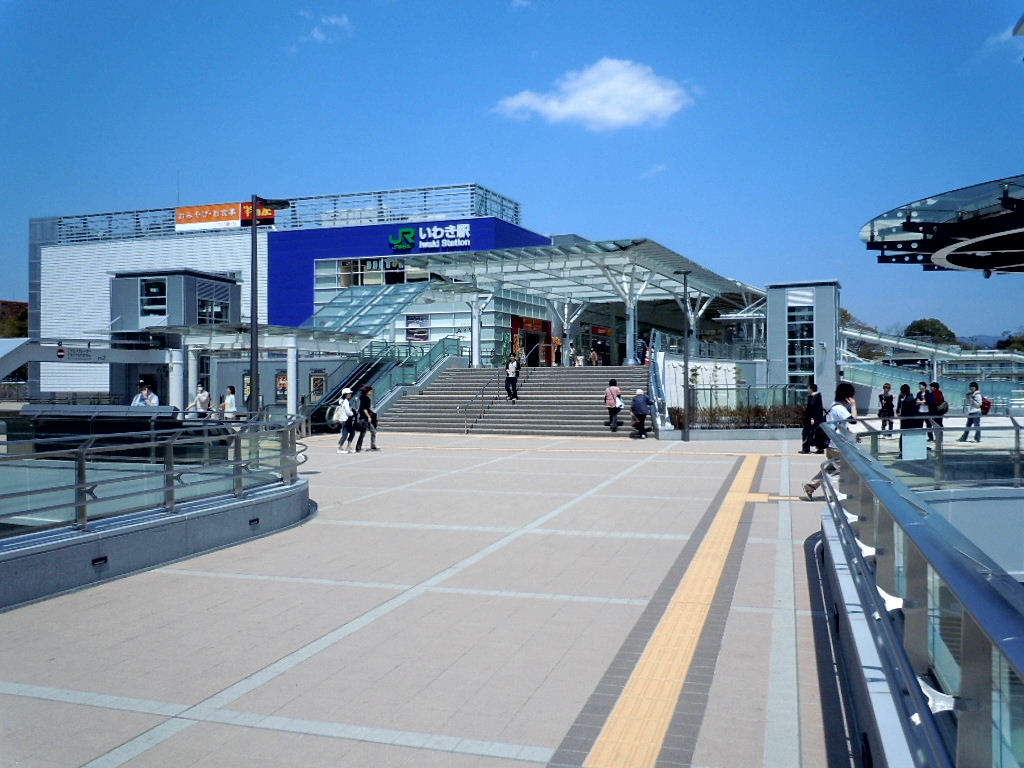
- Iwaki Station south entrance in May 2010

General information
- Location: 1 Tamachi, Taira, Iwaki-shi, Fukushima-ken 970-8026; Japan
- Coordinates: 37.058175°N 140.892131°E
- Operator: JR East
- Lines: ■ Joban Line; ■ Banetsu East Line
- Distance: 209.4 km from Nippori
- Platforms: 3 island platforms
- Connections: Bus terminal

Other information
- Status: Staffed (Midori no Madoguchi )
- Website: Official website

History
- Opened: 25 February 1897; 129 years ago
- Rebuilt: 2009; 17 years ago
- Former names: Taira (until 1994)

Passengers
- FY2018: 5872 daily

Services
Preceding station	JR East	Following station
Yumoto towards Shinagawa	Hitachi	Hirono towards Sendai
Uchigō towards Shinagawa	Jōban Line Local-Futsuu	Kusano towards Sendai
Ogawagō towards Kōriyama	Ban'etsu East Line Rapid Abukuma	Terminus
Akai towards Kōriyama	Ban'etsu East Line Local	Terminus
Location
- Location within Fukushima Prefecture Location within Japan

Iwaki Station (いわき駅, Iwaki-eki) is a railway station in the city of Iwaki, Fukushima, Japan, operated by East Japan Railway Company (JR East).

== Lines ==
Iwaki Station is served by both the Jōban Line and the Banetsu East Line. It is located 209.4 km from the official starting point of the Jōban Line at Nippori in Tokyo. From the Fukushima Daiichi nuclear disaster in March 2011 to March 2020, Iwaki Station became the northern terminus for limited express train services on the line. The station is also the eastern terminus of the Banetsu East Line and is located 85.6 kilometers from the opposing terminus at Kōriyama.

== Station layout ==
Iwaki Station is an elevated station with three opposed island platforms, connected by a footbridge. The station has a Midori no Madoguchi staffed ticket office.

=== Platforms ===
1,2	■ Joban Line	for Isohara, Takahagi, Hitachi, Katsuta, Mito Tomobe, Ishioka and Tsuchiura
1,2	■ Jōban Line (Limited Express)	for Takahagi, Mito, Ueno, Tokyo and Shinagawa
2-5	■ Jōban Line	for Takahagi, Mito and Tsuchiura
2-5	■ Jōban Line	for Hisanohama, Tomioka, Namie, Haranomachi, Sōma and Sendai
6	■ Banetsu East Line	for Ogawagō, Ononiimachi and Kōriyama

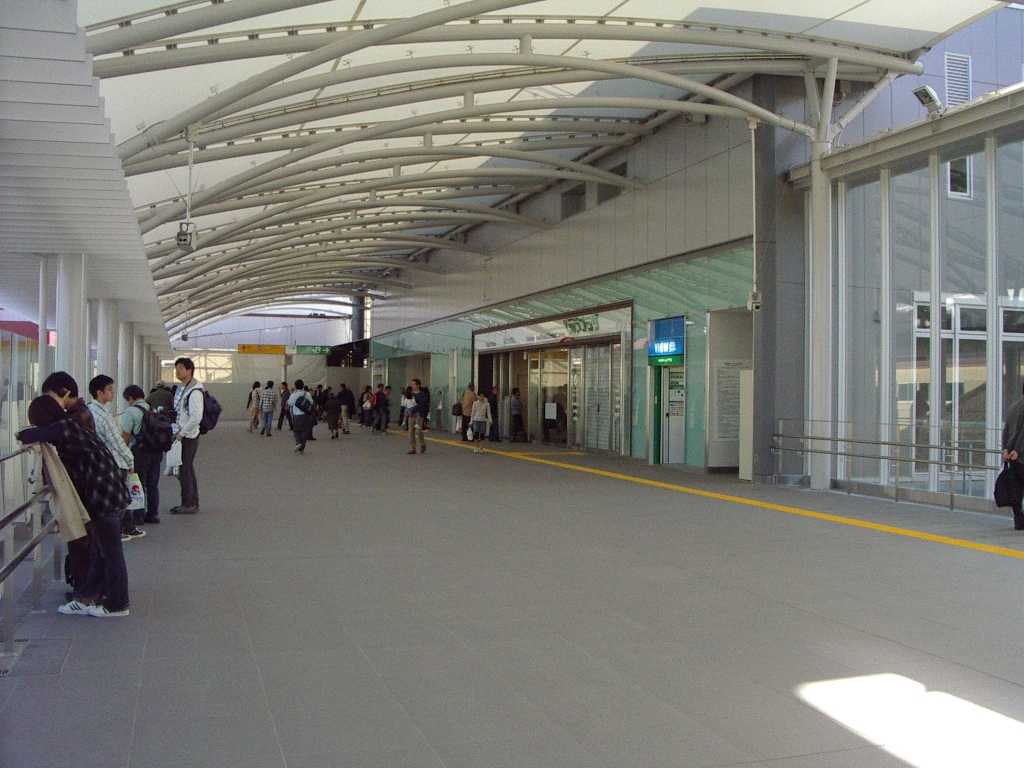
Iwaki Station passageway

== History ==
The station opened on 25 February 1897 as Taira Station (平駅). On 10 October 1917 the Banetsu East Line was extended from to Kōriyama. With the privatization of Japanese National Railways (JNR) on 1 April 1987, the station came under the control of JR East. It was renamed Iwaki on 3 December 1994. A new station building was completed on 19 June 2009.

== Passenger statistics ==
In fiscal 2018, the station was used by an average of 5872 passengers daily (boarding passengers only).

== Surrounding area ==
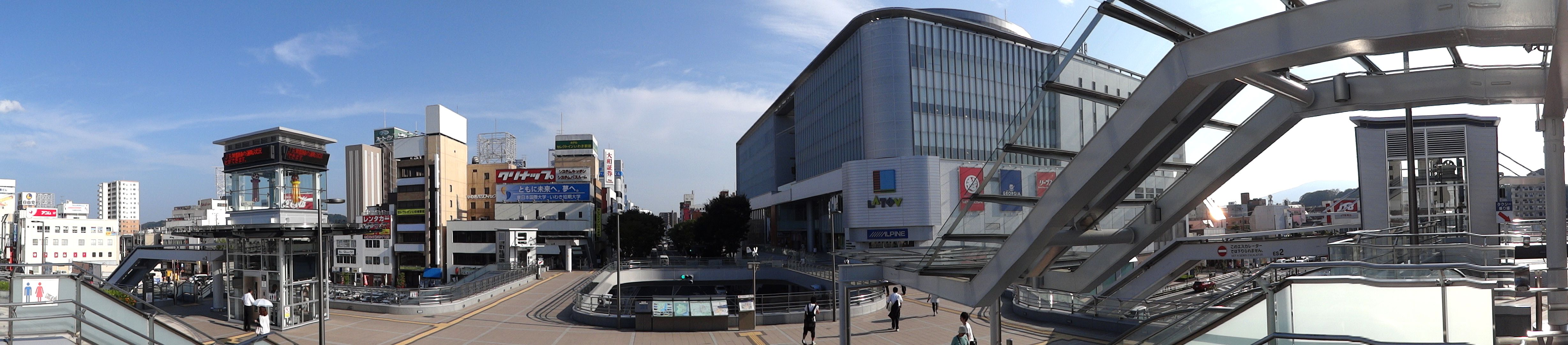
Panorama view of the south side of the station

- Iwaki City Hall
- Iwakidaira Castle ruins
- Iinodaira Castle ruins
- Iino Hachimangu
- Matsugaoka Park

== See also ==
- List of railway stations in Japan
