= Kōriyama Station (Fukushima) =

Railway station in Kōriyama, Fukushima Prefecture, Japan

Kōriyama Station 郡山駅
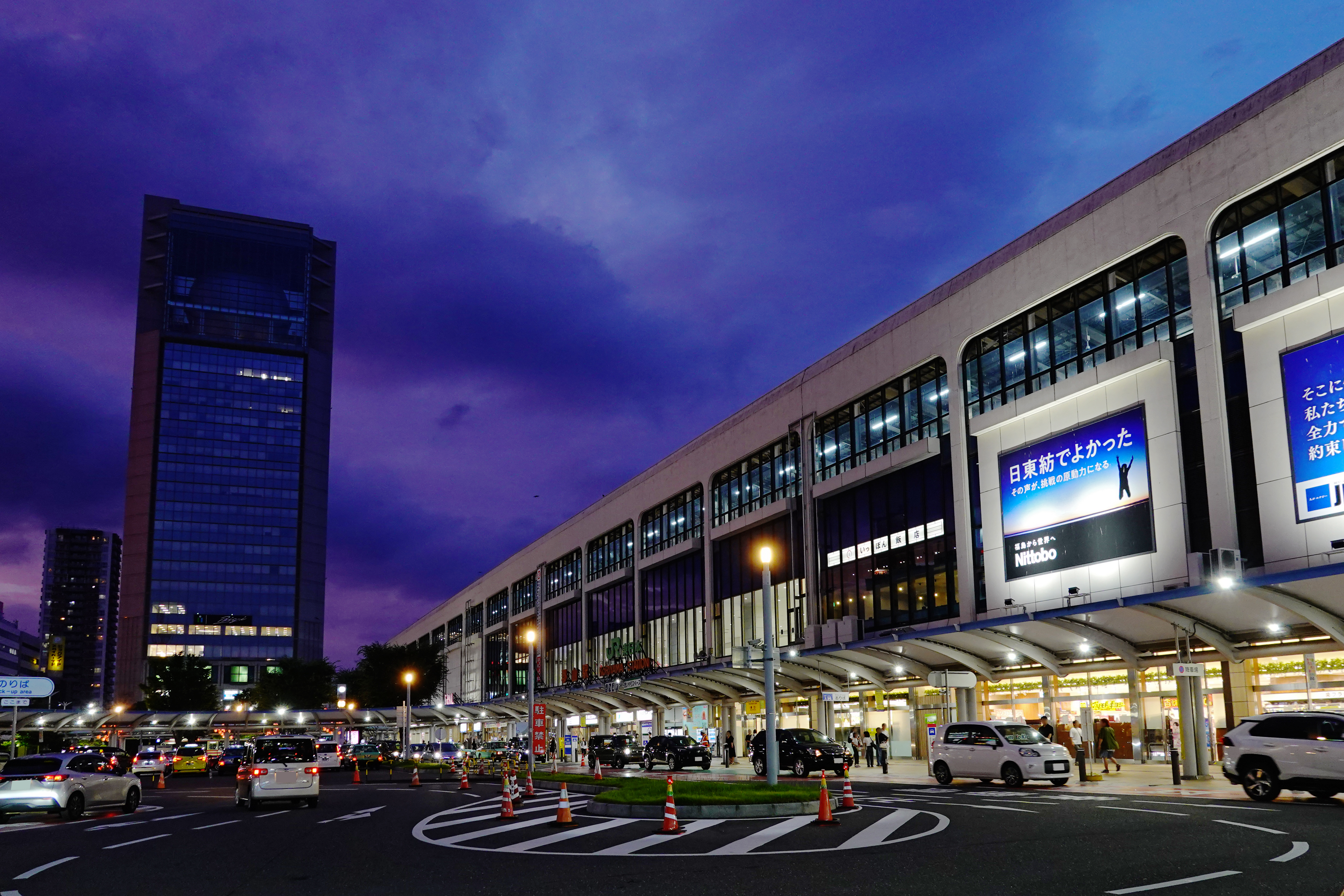
- Kōriyama Station, 2026

General information
- Location: 195 Hiuchida, Kōriyama-shi, Fukushima-ken 963-8002; Japan
- Coordinates: 37.398289°N 140.388794°E
- Operator: JR East; Japan Freight Railway Company
- Lines: Tōhoku Shinkansen; Tōhoku Main Line; Ban'etsu East Line; Ban'etsu West Line; Suigun Line
- Platforms: 3 island + 1 bay platform
- Connections: Bus terminal

Other information
- Status: Staffed (Midori no Madoguchi)
- Website: Official website

History
- Opened: July 16, 1887; 139 years ago

Passengers
- FY2016: 18,111 daily

Services
Preceding station	JR East	Following station
Shin-Shirakawa towards Tokyo	Tōhoku Shinkansen Yamabiko	Fukushima towards Morioka
Shin-Shirakawa towards Tokyo	Tōhoku Shinkansen Nasuno	Terminus
Utsunomiya towards Tokyo	Yamagata Shinkansen Tsubasa	Fukushima towards Shinjō
Asaka-Nagamori towards Kuroiso	Tōhoku Main Line Local	Hiwada towards Morioka
Asaka-Nagamori towards Mito	Suigun Line	Terminus
Terminus	Ban'etsu East Line Rapid Abukuma	Miharu towards Iwaki
Terminus	Ban'etsu East Line Local	Mōgi towards Iwaki
Koriyamatomita towards Kitakata	Ban'etsu West Line Rapid	Terminus
Koriyamatomita towards Niitsu	Ban'etsu West Line Local	Terminus
Location
- Location within Fukushima Prefecture Location within Japan

Kōriyama Station (郡山駅, Kōriyama-eki) is a railway station in the city of Kōriyama, Fukushima Prefecture, Japan, operated by the East Japan Railway Company (JR East), with a freight terminal operated by the Japan Freight Railway Company.

== Lines ==
Kōriyama Station is served by the high-speed Tōhoku Shinkansen line and Tōhoku Main Line, and is located 226.7 km from the official starting point of the Tōhoku Main Line at Tokyo. It is also served by the Banetsu East Line and is 85.6 km from the starting point of that line at Iwaki. It is also a terminus for the Suigun Line and the Banetsu West Line.

== Station layout ==
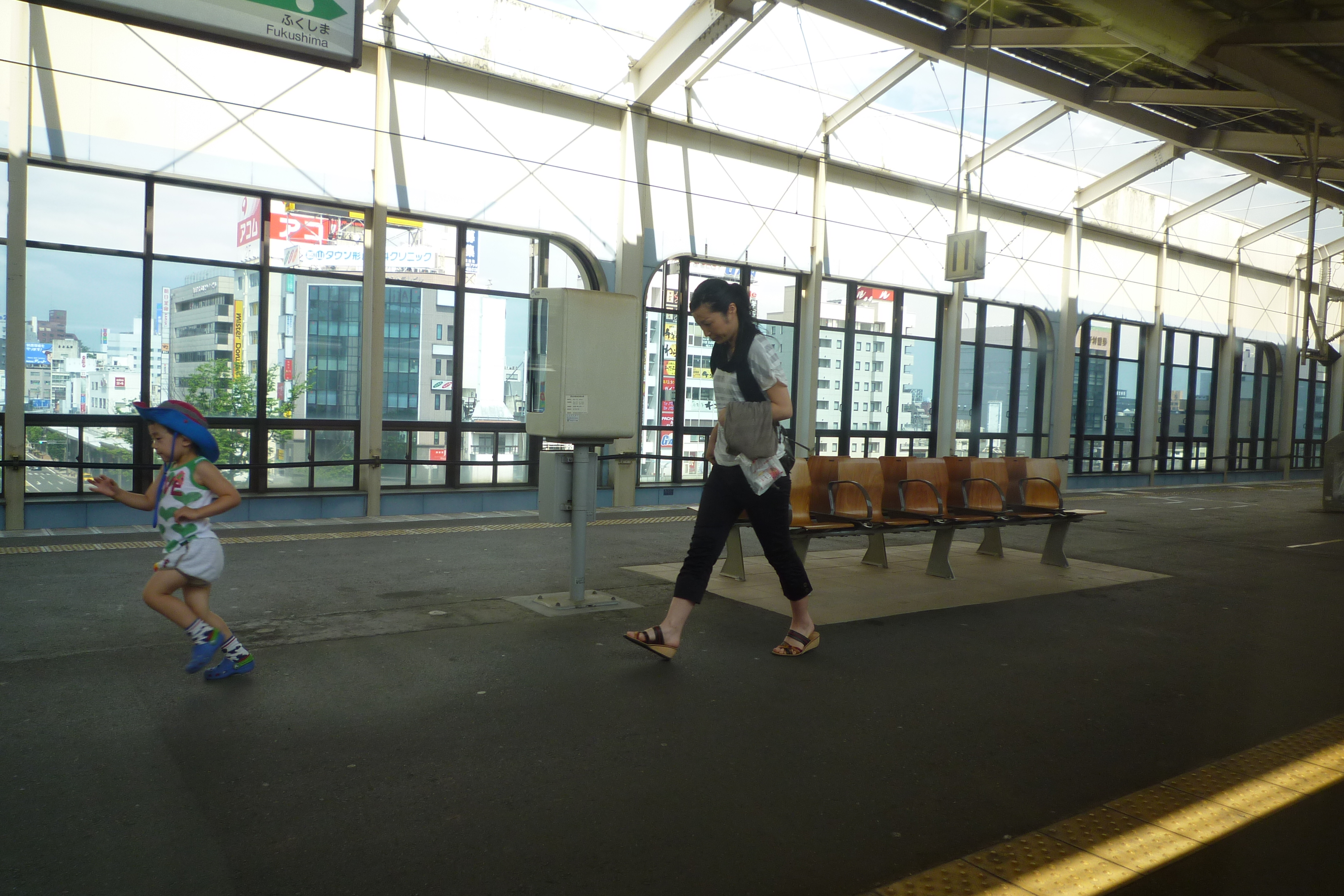
The Tohoku Shinkansen platform, July 2009

Kōriyama Station has two island platforms and one bay platform serving trains on the conventional (narrow gauge) lines, and one island platform and one side platform for shinkansen traffic. The station has a Midori no Madoguchi staffed ticket office.

=== Platforms ===
1	■ Ban'etsu West Line	for Inawashiro and Aizu-Wakamatsu
2, 3, 4	■ Tōhoku Main Line	for Shirakawa and Kuroiso for Nihonmatsu and Fukushima
5	■ Suigun Line	for Iwaki-Ishikawa and Mito
6	■ Ban'etsu East Line	for Miharu and Iwaki

11	■ Tōhoku Shinkansen	for Ōmiya and Tokyo
12	■ Tōhoku Shinkansen	for Fukushima, Sendai and Morioka for Yonezawa, Yamagata and Shinjō (Yamagata Shinkansen)
13	■ Tōhoku Shinkansen	for Ōmiya and Tokyo

The song "Tobira" (扉, Tobira) is used as a departure melody on all conventional platforms and the song "Kiseki" (キセキ, Kiseki) is used as a departure melody on all Shinkansen platforms in 2015. Both songs are by Greeeen, a hip hop group originating in Kōriyama.

== History ==
Komiyama Station opened on July 16, 1887, with service on the Nippon Railway between Kōriyama and Kuroiso. The line was extended to Sendai Station, Miyagi and Shiogama on December 15, 1887. Services on the Ganetsu Line began from July 26, 1898. The station building was rebuilt in 1900. In 1906, the Nippon Railway became the Japanese Government Railway and the station was rebuilt in 1913. On October 10, 1917, the name of Ganetsu Line was changed to Banetsu Line. The station was rebuilt in 1951 and once again in 1980. From June 23, 1982, services on the Tohoku Shinkansen began.

== Passenger statistics ==
In fiscal 2016, the station was used by an average of 18,110 passengers daily (boarding passengers only). Data for previous years as follows:

Fiscal year	Daily average number of passengers
2000	18,834
2001	18,931
2002	18,415
2003	18,353
2004	18,434
2005	18,355
2006	18,380
2007	18,249
2008	17,716
2009	17,217
2010	16,417
2011	15,904
2012	17,382
2013	17,931
2014	17,747
2015	18,142

== Surrounding area ==
Kōriyama Station is located in the centre of the city of Kōriyama. The site of Kōriyama Castle is near the west entrance.

== See also ==
- List of railway stations in Japan
