= Furudono, Fukushima =

Furudono 古殿町
- Town
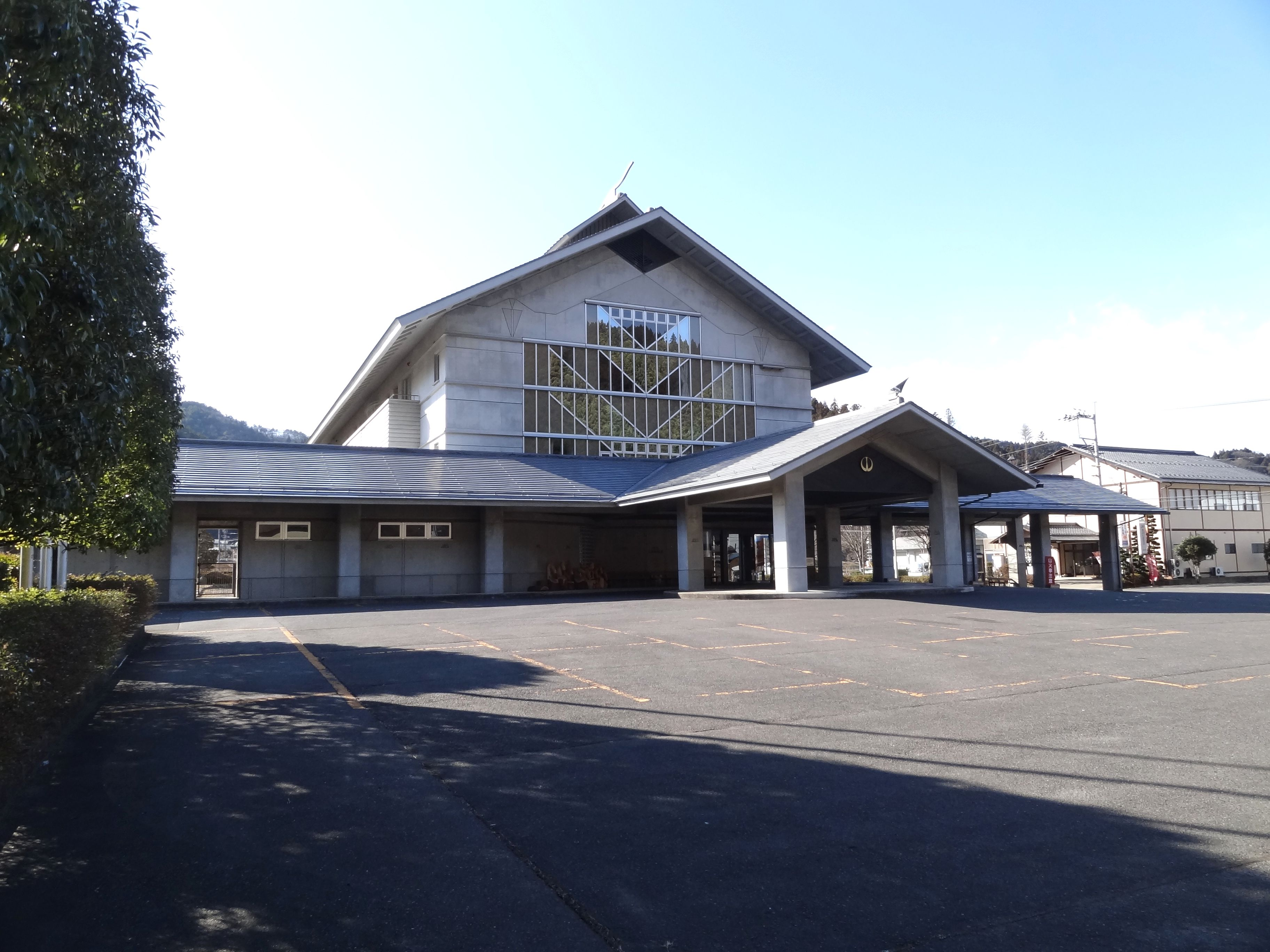
- Furudono Town Hall

- Flag Seal

- Location of Furudono in Fukushima Prefecture

- Coordinates: 37°05′21.1″N 140°33′20.4″E
- Country: Japan
- Region: Tōhoku
- Prefecture: Fukushima
- District: Ishikawa

Area
  - Total: 163.29 km^{2} (63.05 sq mi)

Population (February 29, 2020)
  - Total: 5,149
  - Density: 31.53/km^{2} (81.67/sq mi)
- Time zone: UTC+9 (Japan Standard Time)
- Phone number: 0247-53-3111
- Address: 31 Shin-Kuwabara, Matsukawa, Furudono-machi, Ishikawa-gun, Fukushima-ken 963-8304
- Climate: Cfa
- Website: Official website
- Symbols
- Bird: Green pheasant
- Flower: Lilium auratum
- Tree: Cryptomeria

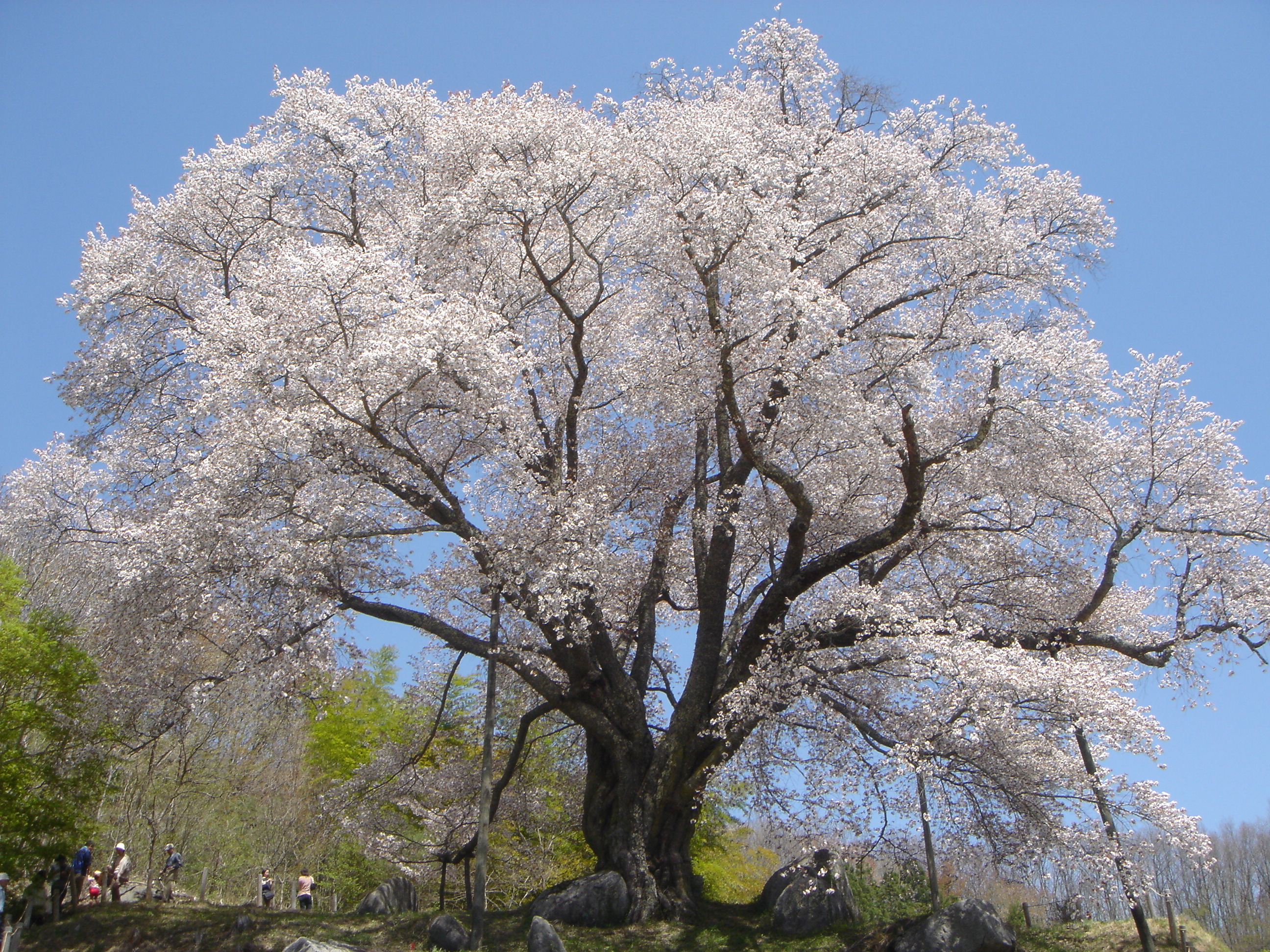
"Koshidai-no-Sakura" in Furudono

Furudono (古殿町, Furudono-machi) is a town located in Fukushima Prefecture, Japan. As of 29 February 2020, the town had an estimated population of 5,149 in 1741 households, and a population density of 33 persons per km^{2}. The total area of the town was 163.29 square kilometres (63.0 sq mi).

== Geography ==
Furudono is located in southern portion of Fukushima prefecture. The town is surrounded by forests and mountains.

=== Neighboring municipalities ===
- Fukushima Prefecture
  - Hirata
  - Ishikawa
  - Iwaki
  - Samegawa

=== Climate ===
Furudono has a humid subtropical climate (Köppen climate classification Cfa). The average annual temperature in Furudono is 10.9 °C (51.6 °F). The average annual rainfall is 1,446 mm (56.9 in) with September as the wettest month. The temperatures are highest on average in August, at around 22.9 °C (73.2 °F), and lowest in January, at around 0.0 °C (32.0 °F).

Climate data for Furudono (2011−2020 normals, extremes 2011−present)
| Month | Jan | Feb | Mar | Apr | May | Jun | Jul | Aug | Sep | Oct | Nov | Dec | Year |
|---|---|---|---|---|---|---|---|---|---|---|---|---|---|
| Record high °C (°F) | 15.0 (59.0) | 20.3 (68.5) | 25.0 (77.0) | 28.2 (82.8) | 32.3 (90.1) | 32.5 (90.5) | 34.6 (94.3) | 35.8 (96.4) | 32.2 (90.0) | 27.6 (81.7) | 22.2 (72.0) | 18.3 (64.9) | 35.8 (96.4) |
| Mean daily maximum °C (°F) | 4.8 (40.6) | 5.6 (42.1) | 10.6 (51.1) | 15.8 (60.4) | 21.9 (71.4) | 23.7 (74.7) | 27.4 (81.3) | 29.1 (84.4) | 24.6 (76.3) | 18.9 (66.0) | 13.3 (55.9) | 7.3 (45.1) | 16.9 (62.4) |
| Daily mean °C (°F) | −0.5 (31.1) | 0.1 (32.2) | 4.0 (39.2) | 8.8 (47.8) | 14.8 (58.6) | 17.9 (64.2) | 22.0 (71.6) | 23.1 (73.6) | 18.9 (66.0) | 13.0 (55.4) | 7.0 (44.6) | 1.7 (35.1) | 10.9 (51.6) |
| Mean daily minimum °C (°F) | −4.8 (23.4) | −4.4 (24.1) | −1.4 (29.5) | 2.8 (37.0) | 8.5 (47.3) | 13.6 (56.5) | 18.3 (64.9) | 19.2 (66.6) | 15.0 (59.0) | 8.5 (47.3) | 2.0 (35.6) | −2.7 (27.1) | 6.2 (43.2) |
| Record low °C (°F) | −13.6 (7.5) | −12.7 (9.1) | −7.4 (18.7) | −4.6 (23.7) | −0.6 (30.9) | 4.9 (40.8) | 12.1 (53.8) | 9.5 (49.1) | 6.0 (42.8) | 0.0 (32.0) | −5.9 (21.4) | −9.3 (15.3) | −13.6 (7.5) |
| Average precipitation mm (inches) | 50.1 (1.97) | 40.1 (1.58) | 92.2 (3.63) | 117.2 (4.61) | 108.6 (4.28) | 146.2 (5.76) | 173.1 (6.81) | 165.0 (6.50) | 200.1 (7.88) | 174.6 (6.87) | 54.6 (2.15) | 41.4 (1.63) | 1,356.9 (53.42) |
| Average precipitation days (≥ 1.0 mm) | 5.0 | 5.3 | 7.9 | 9.1 | 8.7 | 11.4 | 13.0 | 12.1 | 12.3 | 9.5 | 7.0 | 5.3 | 106.6 |
Source: Japan Meteorological Agency

== Demographics ==
Per Japanese census data, the population of Furudono peaked in around the year 1950 and has been in decline over the past 70 years. It is now less than it was a century ago.

Historical population
| Year | Pop. | ±% |
|---|---|---|
| 1920 | 7,571 | — |
| 1930 | 8,328 | +10.0% |
| 1940 | 9,190 | +10.4% |
| 1950 | 11,317 | +23.1% |
| 1960 | 11,250 | −0.6% |
| 1970 | 9,113 | −19.0% |
| 1980 | 7,879 | −13.5% |
| 1990 | 7,617 | −3.3% |
| 2000 | 6,818 | −10.5% |
| 2010 | 6,030 | −11.6% |
| 2020 | 4,825 | −20.0% |

== History ==
The area of present-day Furudono was part of ancient Mutsu Province. During the Edo period most of the area was tenryō under direct control of the Tokugawa shogunate, with smaller portions as an exclave of part of the holdings of Omigawa Domain. After the Meiji Restoration, it was organized as part of Higashishirakawa District within the Nakadōri region of Iwaki Province. The villages of Minamoto and Takanuki were formed with the establishment of the modern municipalities system on April 1, 1889.

The village of Furudono was formed on March 31, 1955, with the merger of the villages of Miyamoto and Takanuki. Furudono was raised to town status on April 1, 1957. The administrative control of the town was transferred from Higashishirakawa District to Ishikawa District on April 1, 1994.

== Economy ==
The economy of Furudono is primarily based on agriculture.

== Education ==
Furudono has one public elementary school and one public junior high school operated by the town government. The town does not have a high school.

- Furudono Middle School
- Furudono Elementary School

== Transportation ==
=== Railway ===
- Furudono does not have any passenger rail service.

=== Highway ===
- National Route 349

== Local attractions ==
- Koshidai Sakura – one of the 100 famous trees of Japan

== International relations ==
- Warkworth, New Zealand
