= Samegawa, Fukushima =

Samegawa 鮫川村
- Village
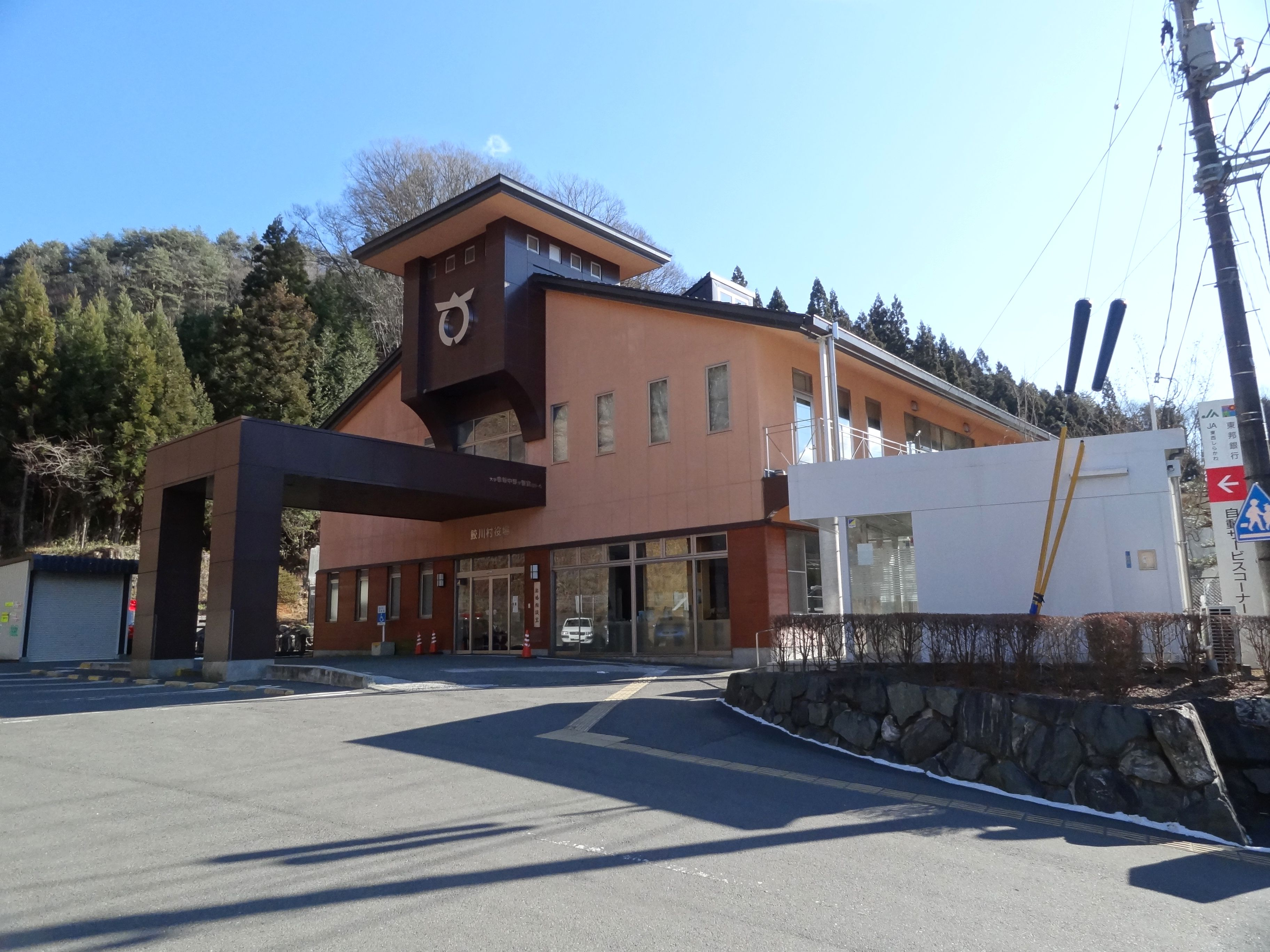
- Samegawa Village Hall

- Flag Seal

- Location of Samegawa in Fukushima Prefecture

- Coordinates: 37°02′32.6″N 140°30′34.65″E
- Country: Japan
- Region: Tōhoku
- Prefecture: Fukushima
- District: Higashishirakawa

Area
  - Total: 131.34 km^{2} (50.71 sq mi)

Population (January 2020)
  - Total: 3,081
  - Density: 23.46/km^{2} (60.76/sq mi)
- Time zone: UTC+9 (Japan Standard Time)
- City symbols
  - Tree: White birch
  - Flower: Lilium auratum
  - Bird: Green pheasant
  - Insect: Sasakia charonda
- Phone number: 0247-49-3111
- Address: 39-5 Akasaka Nakano Shinjuku, Tanagura, Samegawa-mura, Higashishirakawa-gun, Fukushima-ken 963-8401
- Website: Official website

Samegawa (鮫川村, Samegawa-mura) is a village located in Fukushima Prefecture, Japan. As of 1 January 2020, the village had an estimated population of 3,081 in 1107 households, and a population density of 23 persons per km^{2}. The total area of the village was 131.34 square kilometres (50.7 sq mi).

== Geography ==
Samegawa is located in the southernmost portion of Fukushima prefecture, bordering on Ibaraki Prefecture to the southeast. The area of the village is hilly with an altitude of between 400 and 600 meters, and over fifty percent covered in forest. Samegawa has a humid climate (Köppen climate classification Cfa). The average annual temperature in Samegawa is 10.5 °C (50.9 °F). The average annual rainfall is 1,500 mm (59 in) with September as the wettest month.

=== Neighboring municipalities ===
- Fukushima Prefecture
  - Asakawa
  - Furudono
  - Hanawa
  - Ishikawa
  - Iwaki
  - Tanagura
- Ibaraki Prefecture
  - Kitaibaraki

== Demographics ==
Per Japanese census data, the population of Samegawa peaked around the year 1950 and has been in decline over the past 70 years.

Historical population
Year	Pop.	±%
1920	5,919	—
1930	6,312	+6.6%
1940	6,676	+5.8%
1950	8,077	+21.0%
1960	7,926	−1.9%
1970	6,404	−19.2%
1980	5,537	−13.5%
1990	5,219	−5.7%
2000	4,602	−11.8%
2010	3,989	−13.3%
2020	3,049	−23.6%

== Climate ==
Samegawa has a humid subtropical climate (Köppen climate classification Cfa). The average annual temperature in Samegawa is 10.5 °C (50.9 °F). The average annual rainfall is 1,500 mm (59 in) with September being the wettest month. The temperatures are highest on average in August, at around 22.6 °C (72.7 °F), and lowest in January, at around −0.5 °C (31.1 °F).

== History ==
The area of present-day Samegawa was part of ancient Mutsu Province. After the Meiji Restoration, it was organized as part of Higashishirakawa in the Nakadōri region of Iwaki Province. Samegawa village was formed on April 1, 1889, with the creation of the modern municipalities system.

== Education ==
Samegawa has two public elementary schools and one public junior high school operated by the village government, and one public high school operated by the Fukushima Prefectural Board of Education.

- Fukushima Prefectural Shumei Commercial High School
- Samegawa Junior High School

== Transportation ==
=== Railway ===
- Samegawa does not have any passenger railway service.

=== Highway ===
- National Route 289
- National Route 349
