= Kakuda Prefecture =

Former administrative division of Japan

Kakuda Prefecture (Japanese: 角田県), formerly Shiraishi Prefecture, was a prefecture in northern Iwaki Province and later southern Rikuzen Province. It was established in September 1869 (August Meiji 2) by the Meiji government. The jurisdiction corresponded to the current southern part of Miyagi Prefecture and Shinchi of Fukushima Prefecture.

== History ==
At the end of Boshin War, the territory of Sendai Domain was reduced from 620,000 koku to 280,000 koku on 5 February 1869 (24 December Meiji 2). In the following territorial reorganization, the Nanbu clan, which previously ruled Morioka Domain to the north, was relocated to the newly created Iwaki Province. Its new territory, Shiraishi Domain (Japanese: 白石藩), consisted of nine villages in the districts of Katta, Shibata, Igu and Watari.

On September, the Nanbu clan was allowed to return to its former territory on the condition of a payment to the Meiji government. As a result, Shiraishi Domain came under the direct control of the government and became Shiraishi Prefecture. Three months later, the prefectural office was moved to Kakuda, and the prefecture was renamed to Kakuda Prefecture.

On 13 December 1871 (2 November Meiji 4), Kakuda Prefecture was abolished, and its territory was incorporated into Sendai Prefecture (currently Miyagi Prefecture).
