= Ishikawa, Fukushima =

Ishikawa 石川町
- Town
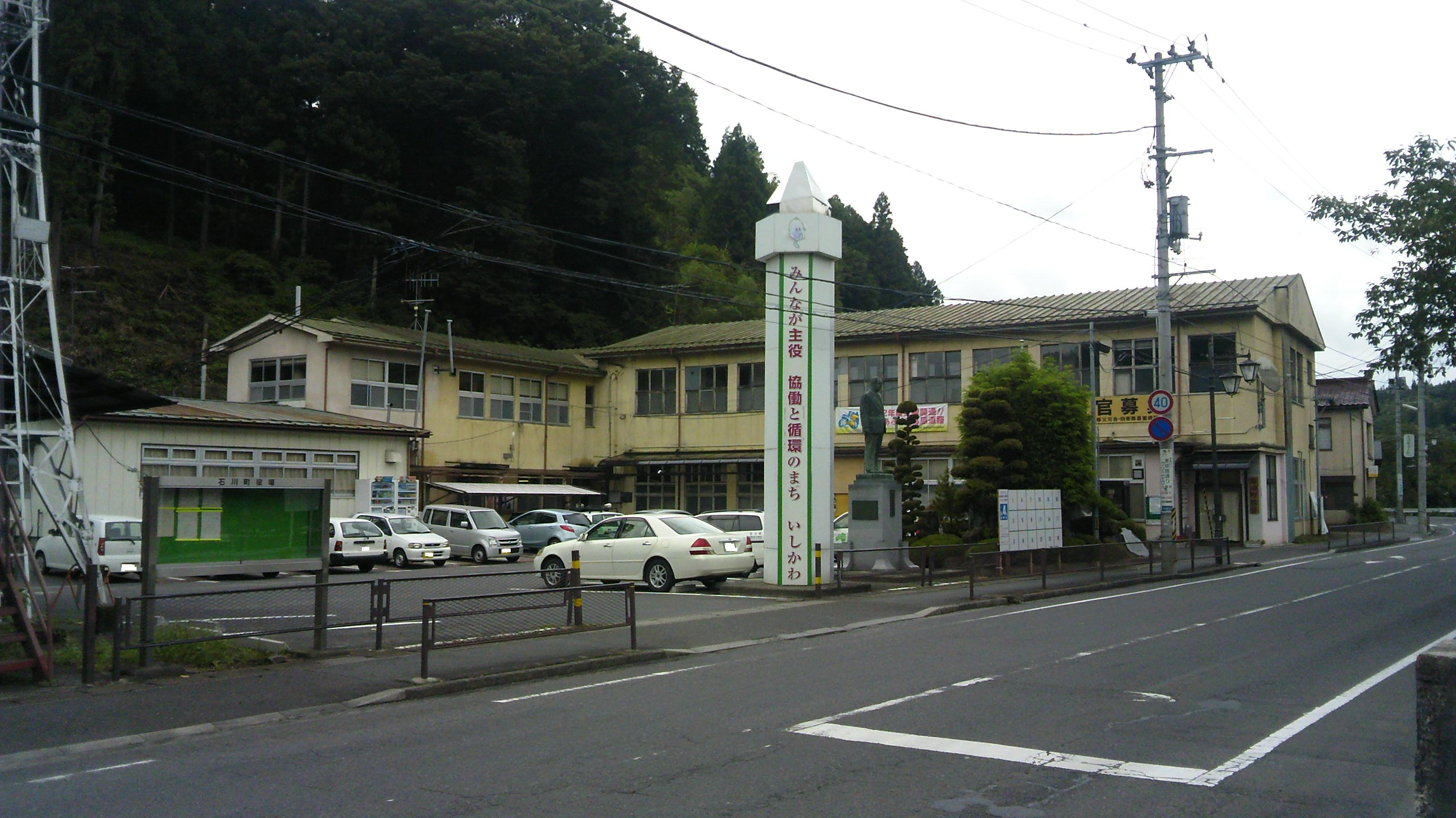
- Ishikawa Town Hall

- Flag Seal

- Location of Ishikawa in Fukushima Prefecture

- Coordinates: 37°09′25.4″N 140°26′48.5″E
- Country: Japan
- Region: Tōhoku
- Prefecture: Fukushima
- District: Ishikawa

Area
  - Total: 115.71 km^{2} (44.68 sq mi)

Population (May 2018)
  - Total: 15,511
  - Density: 134.05/km^{2} (347.19/sq mi)
- Time zone: UTC+9 (Japan Standard Time)
- Phone number: 0247-26-2111
- Address: 153-2 Shimoizumi, Ishikawa-machi, Ishikawa-gun, Fukushima-ken 963-7858
- Climate: Cfa
- Website: Official website
- Symbols
- Bird: Japanese bush warbler
- Flower: Sakura
- Tree: Cryptomeria

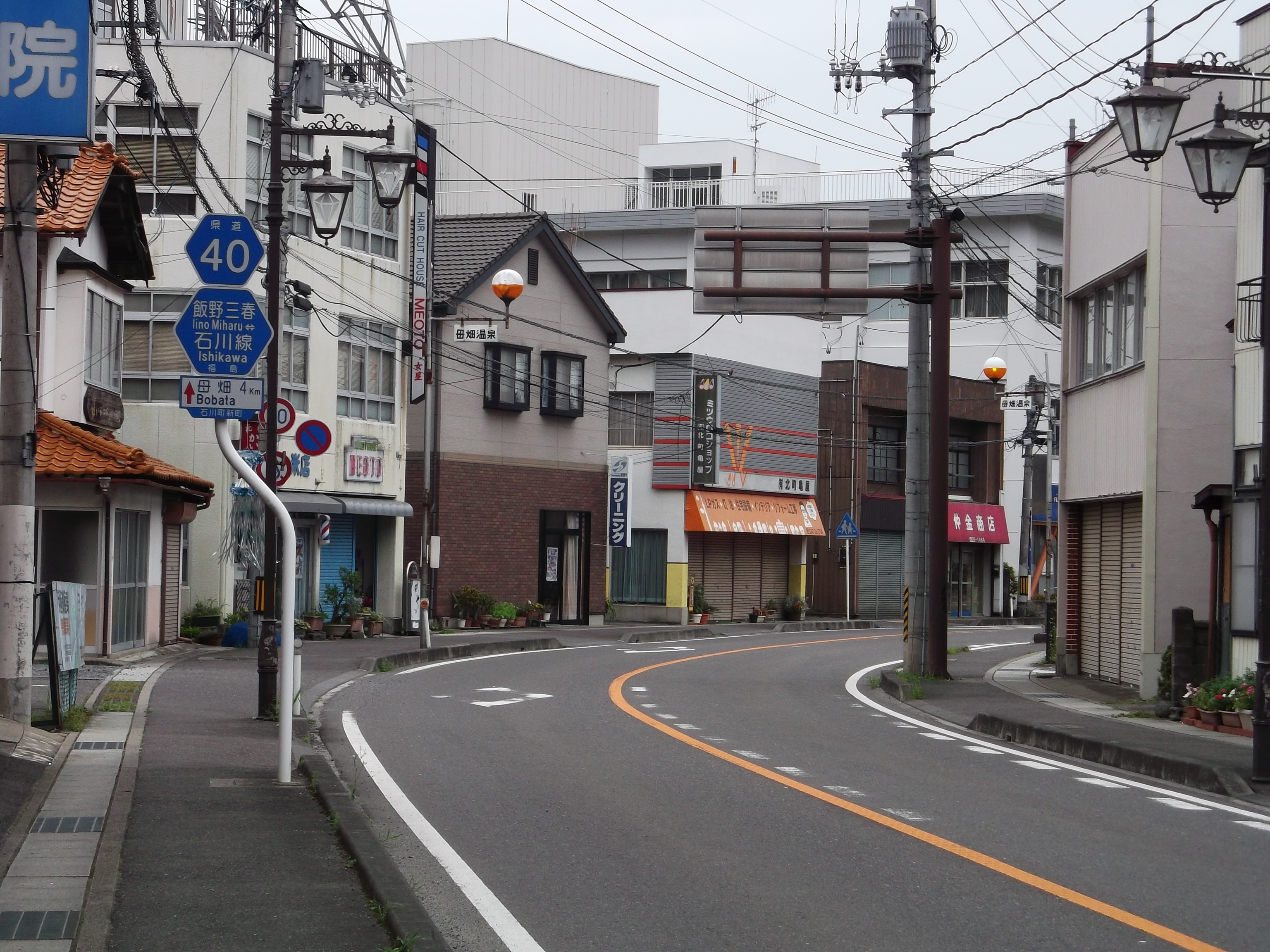
downtown Ishikawa

Ishikawa (石川町, Ishikawa-machi) is a town located in Fukushima Prefecture, Japan. As of 21 March 2018, the town had an estimated population of 15,511 in 5690 households, and a population density of 130 persons per km^{2}. The total area of the town was 115.71 square kilometres (44.7 sq mi).

== Geography ==
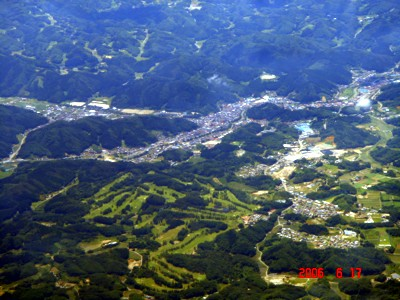
Aerial view of Ishikawa

Ishikawa is located in south-central Fukushima prefecture.

- Rivers: Abukuma River

=== Neighboring municipalities ===
- Fukushima Prefecture
  - Asakawa
  - Furudono
  - Hirata
  - Nakajima
  - Samegawa
  - Shirakawa
  - Tamakawa
  - Yabuki

=== Climate ===
Ishikawa has a humid subtropical climate (Köppen climate classification Cfa). The average annual temperature in Ishikawa is 11.4 °C (52.5 °F). The average annual rainfall is 1,375 mm (54.1 in) with September being the wettest month. The temperatures are highest on average in August, at around 23.6 °C (74.5 °F), and lowest in January, at around 0.2 °C (32.4 °F).

Climate data for Ishikawa (1991−2020 normals, extremes 1976−present)
Month	Jan	Feb	Mar	Apr	May	Jun	Jul	Aug	Sep	Oct	Nov	Dec	Year
Record high °C (°F)	15.5 (59.9)	20.3 (68.5)	24.3 (75.7)	30.5 (86.9)	35.5 (95.9)	35.3 (95.5)	37.1 (98.8)	37.7 (99.9)	35.3 (95.5)	29.5 (85.1)	23.0 (73.4)	20.7 (69.3)	37.7 (99.9)
Mean daily maximum °C (°F)	5.3 (41.5)	6.4 (43.5)	10.5 (50.9)	16.8 (62.2)	22.2 (72.0)	25.2 (77.4)	28.7 (83.7)	30.0 (86.0)	25.6 (78.1)	19.6 (67.3)	13.9 (57.0)	8.2 (46.8)	17.7 (63.9)
Daily mean °C (°F)	0.3 (32.5)	1.0 (33.8)	4.5 (40.1)	10.2 (50.4)	15.6 (60.1)	19.4 (66.9)	23.2 (73.8)	24.1 (75.4)	20.0 (68.0)	13.9 (57.0)	7.9 (46.2)	2.8 (37.0)	11.9 (53.4)
Mean daily minimum °C (°F)	−3.7 (25.3)	−3.4 (25.9)	−0.6 (30.9)	4.2 (39.6)	9.8 (49.6)	14.9 (58.8)	19.2 (66.6)	20.1 (68.2)	16.0 (60.8)	9.5 (49.1)	3.1 (37.6)	−1.4 (29.5)	7.3 (45.2)
Record low °C (°F)	−13.7 (7.3)	−13.4 (7.9)	−14.9 (5.2)	−5.0 (23.0)	0.0 (32.0)	5.6 (42.1)	9.1 (48.4)	10.8 (51.4)	3.9 (39.0)	−0.7 (30.7)	−5.0 (23.0)	−12.3 (9.9)	−14.9 (5.2)
Average precipitation mm (inches)	46.8 (1.84)	37.8 (1.49)	78.8 (3.10)	94.5 (3.72)	101.1 (3.98)	126.2 (4.97)	187.5 (7.38)	165.6 (6.52)	185.3 (7.30)	150.3 (5.92)	65.4 (2.57)	42.3 (1.67)	1,281.5 (50.45)
Average precipitation days (≥ 1.0 mm)	5.8	5.5	9.0	9.7	10.6	12.9	14.5	11.7	12.6	9.6	7.2	6.1	115.2
Mean monthly sunshine hours	163.5	159.2	187.3	192.7	199.0	152.8	151.2	171.2	131.2	139.4	146.3	158.1	1,952
Source: Japan Meteorological Agency

== Demographics ==
Per Japanese census data, the population of Ishikawa has been in decline over the past 70 years.

Historical population
Year	Pop.	±%
1920	16,625	—
1930	18,370	+10.5%
1940	19,728	+7.4%
1950	25,332	+28.4%
1960	24,493	−3.3%
1970	22,423	−8.5%
1980	21,731	−3.1%
1990	21,534	−0.9%
2000	19,914	−7.5%
2010	17,775	−10.7%
2020	13,552	−23.8%

== History ==
The area of present-day Ishikawa was part of ancient Mutsu Province. During the Edo period, the area was tenryō under the direct control of the Tokugawa shogunate. After the Meiji Restoration, it was organized as part of Ishikawa District in the Nakadōri region of Iwaki Province.

The villages of Ishikawa, Sawada, Nogisawa, Bohata, Nakatani and Yamahashi were formed on April 1, 1889, with the creation of the modern municipalities system. Ishikawa was promoted to town status on March 27, 1894. During World War II, the town had a secret uranium mine for the Japanese atomic bomb project. The town expanded by annexing the neighboring villages of Sawada, Nogisawa, Bohata, Nakatani and Yamahashi on March 31, 1955.

== Economy ==
The economy of Ishikawa is primarily based on agriculture.

== Education ==
Ishikawa has three public elementary schools and one public junior high school operated by the town government, and one public high school operated by the Fukushima Prefectural Board of Education. There is also one private junior high school and one private high school.

- Fukushima Prefectural Ishikawa High School
- Ishikawa High School
- Ishikawa Middle School
- Ishikawa Sawada Middle School
- Ishikawa Gijuku Middle School
- Ishikawa Elementary School
- Ishikawa Sawada Elementary School
- Ishikawa Nogisawa Elementary School
- Ishikawa Bobata Elementary School
- Ishikawa Nakatani No. 1 Elementary School
- Ishikawa Nakatani No. 2 Elementary School
- Ishikawa Yamagata Elementary School
- Ishikawa Minami-Yamagata Elementary School

== Transportation ==
=== Railway ===
JR East – Suigun Line

- Iwaki-Ishikawa - Nogisawa

=== Highway ===
- Abukuma Kōgen Road
- National Route 118

== Local attractions ==
- Bobata Onsen
- Katakura Onsen
- Nekonaki Onsen
