= Nakajima, Fukushima =

Nakajima 中島村
- Village
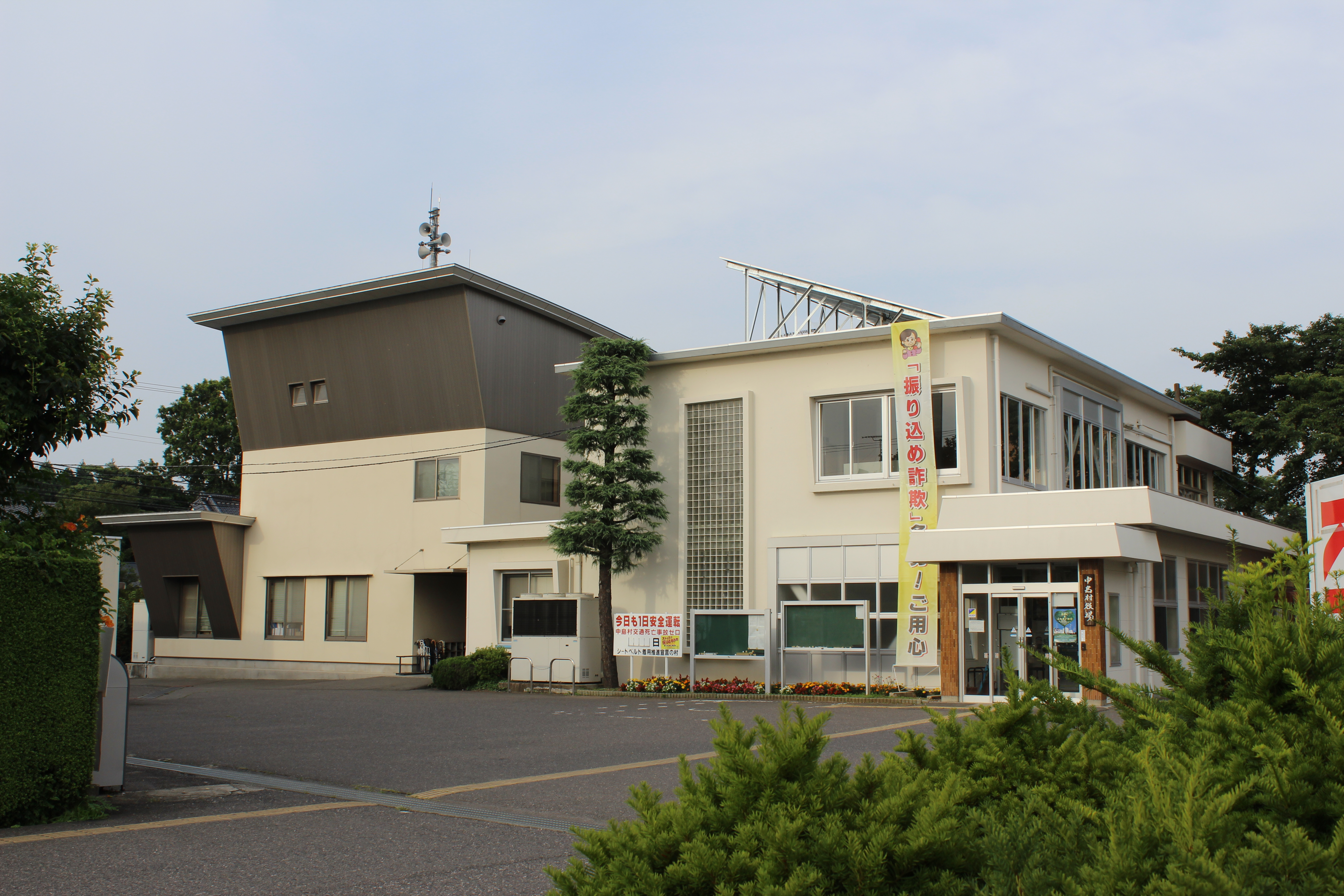
- Nakajima Village Hall

- Flag Seal

- Location of Nakajima in Fukushima Prefecture

- Coordinates: 37°8′55.7″N 140°21′0.6″E
- Country: Japan
- Region: Tōhoku
- Prefecture: Fukushima
- District: Nishishirakawa

Area
  - Total: 18.92 km^{2} (7.31 sq mi)

Population (April 2020)
  - Total: 5,031
  - Density: 265.9/km^{2} (688.7/sq mi)
- Time zone: UTC+9 (Japan Standard Time)
- Tree: Pinus densiflora
- Flower: Rhododendron indicum
- Phone number: 0248-52-2111
- Address: Nametsu Nakajima-nishi 11-1 Nakajima-mura, Nishishirakawa-gun, Fukushima-ken 961-0192
- Website: Official website

Nakajima (中島村, Nakajima-mura) is a village located in Fukushima Prefecture, Japan. As of 1 April 2020, the village had an estimated population of 5,031 in 1696 households, and a population density of 270 persons per km². The total area of the village was 18.92 square kilometres (7.31 sq mi).

== Geography ==
Nakajima is located in the flatlands of south-central Fukushima prefecture.

- Rivers: Abukuma River

=== Neighboring municipalities ===
- Fukushima Prefecture
  - Ishikawa
  - Izumizaki
  - Shirakawa
  - Yabuki

== Demographics ==
Per Japanese census data, the population of Nakajima has remained relatively stable over the past 50 years.

Historical population
Year	Pop.	±%
1920	3,145	—
1930	3,846	+22.3%
1940	4,239	+10.2%
1950	5,616	+32.5%
1960	5,219	−7.1%
1970	4,438	−15.0%
1980	4,448	+0.2%
1990	4,885	+9.8%
2000	5,274	+8.0%
2010	5,154	−2.3%
2020	4,885	−5.2%

== Climate ==
Nakajima has a humid subtropical climate (Köppen climate classification Cfa). The average annual temperature in Nakajima is 11.7 °C (53.1 °F). The average annual rainfall is 1,341 mm (52.8 in) with September as the wettest month. The temperatures are highest on average in August, at around 24.1 °C (75.4 °F), and lowest in January, at around 0.3 °C (32.5 °F).

== History ==
The area of present-day Nakajima was part of ancient Mutsu Province. The area was mostly tenryō territory under the direct control of the Tokugawa shogunate during the Edo period, except for a portion which was an exclave of Takada Domain of Echigo Province. After the Meiji Restoration, it was organized as part of Nishishirakawa District in the Nakadōri region of Iwaki Province. The villages of Nametsu and Yoshikogawa. were established with the creation of the modern municipalities system on April 1, 1889. Nakajima Village was formed on January 1, 1955 through the merger of the two villages.

== Economy ==
The economy of Nakajima is primarily agricultural.

== Education ==
Nakajima has two public elementary schools and one public junior high school operated by the village government. The village does not have a high school.

- Nakajima Middle School

== Transportation ==
=== Railway ===
- Nakajma does have any passenger railway service

=== Highway ===
- Nakajima is not served by any national highway
