= Tanagura, Fukushima =

Tanagura 棚倉町
- Town
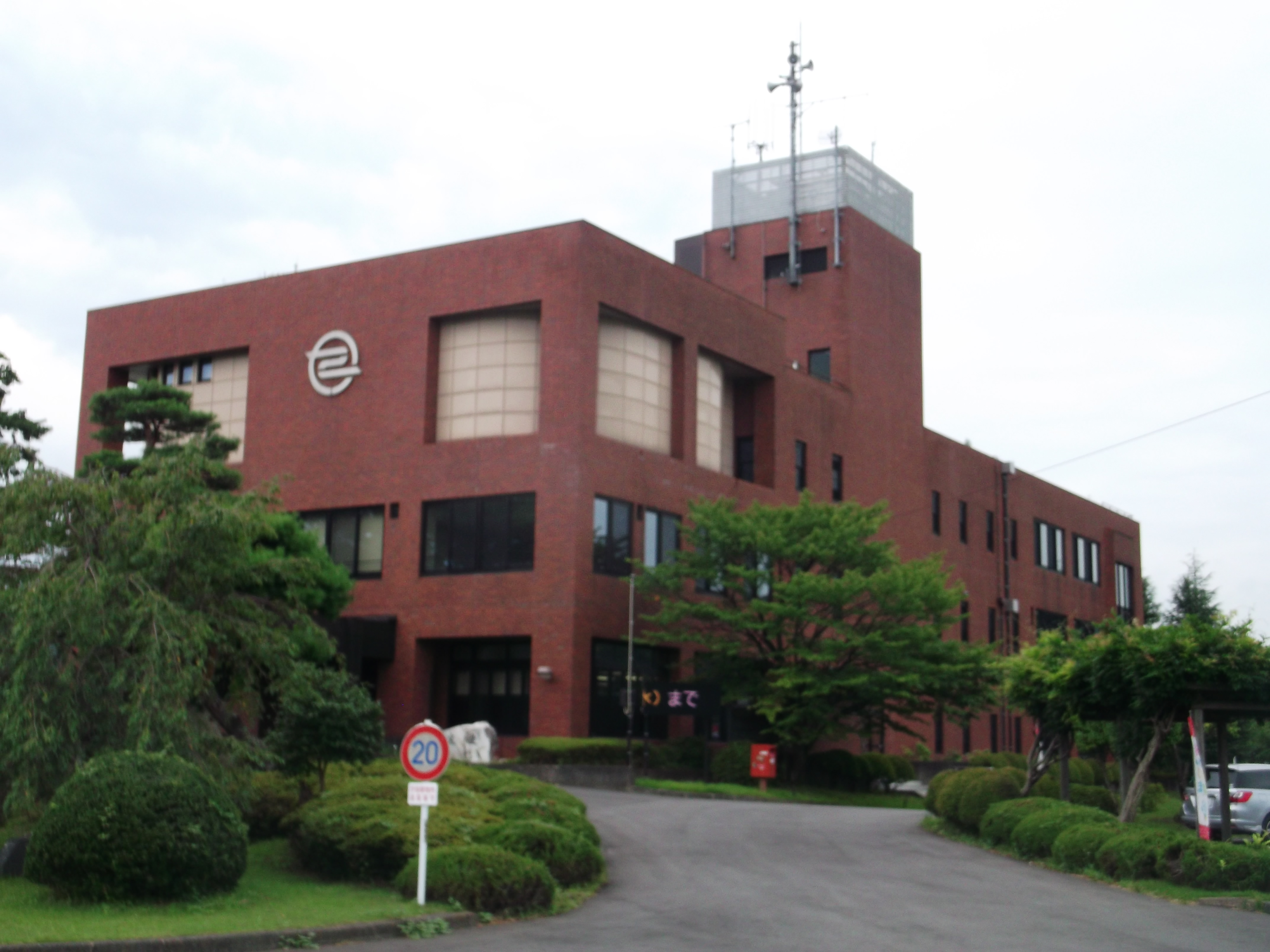
- Tanagura Town Hall

- Flag Seal

- Location of Tanagura in Fukushima Prefecture

- Coordinates: 37°01′47.5″N 140°22′46.5″E
- Country: Japan
- Region: Tōhoku
- Prefecture: Fukushima
- District: Higashishirakawa

Area
  - Total: 159.93 km^{2} (61.75 sq mi)

Population (April 2020)
  - Total: 13,827
  - Density: 86.457/km^{2} (223.92/sq mi)
- Time zone: UTC+9 (Japan Standard Time)
- Tree: Japanese Red Pine
- Flower: Azalea
- Phone number: 0247-33-3111
- Address: 33 Nakayano, Tanagura, Tanagura-machi, Higashishirakawa-gun, Fukushima-ken 963-6131
- Website: Official website

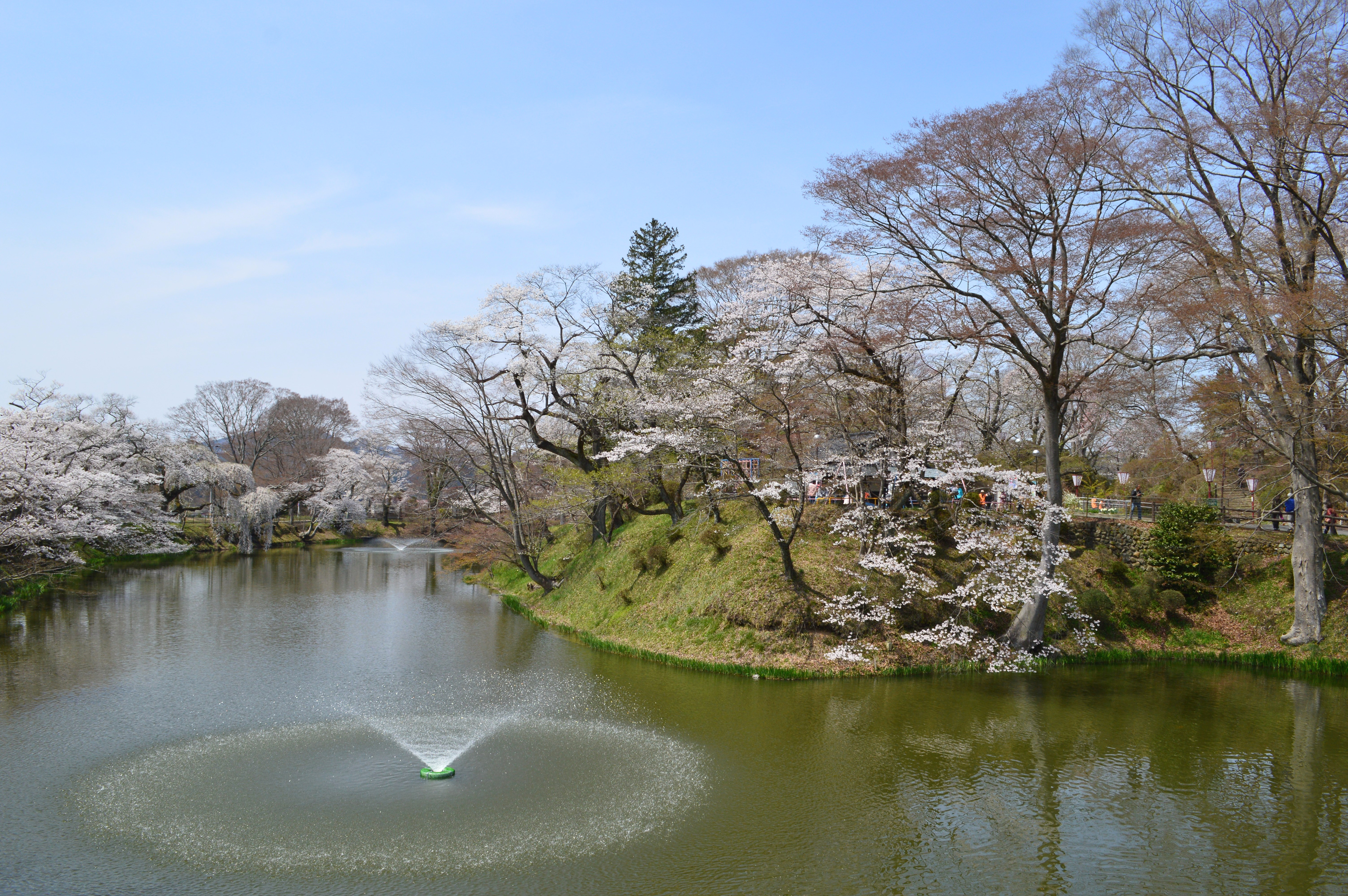
Site of Tanagura Castle

Tanagura (棚倉町, Tanagura-machi) is a town located in Fukushima Prefecture, Japan. As of 1 April 2020, the town had an estimated population of 13,827 in 5053 households, and a population density of 86 persons per km^{2}. The total area of the town was 159.93 km^{2} (61.75 sq mi).

== Geography ==
Tanagura is located in the southernmost portion of Fukushima prefecture, bordering on Tochigi Prefecture to the west and Ibaraki Prefecture to the south.

- Mountains: Yamizosan (1021.8m)
- Rivers: Kuji River

=== Neighboring municipalities ===
- Fukushima Prefecture
  - Asakawa
  - Hanawa
  - Samegawa
  - Shirakawa
  - Yamatsuri
- Ibaraki Prefecture
  - Daigo
- Tochigi Prefecture
  - Nasu
  - Ōtawara

== Demographics ==
Per Japanese census data, the population of Tanagura was relatively constant throughout the late 20th century but has begun to decline in the 21st.

Tanagura has been recognized by Japan's Office for the Promotion of Regional Revitalization (Kishida Cabinet Secretariat), which promotes the development of new technologies to combat depopulation, for its digital transformation/telework infrastructure. Related projects have been awarded over ¥6M in government grants.

Historical population
Year	Pop.	±%
1920	12,536	—
1930	14,150	+12.9%
1940	14,835	+4.8%
1950	19,865	+33.9%
1960	18,755	−5.6%
1970	16,621	−11.4%
1980	16,105	−3.1%
1990	16,606	+3.1%
2000	16,376	−1.4%
2010	15,054	−8.1%
2020	13,343	−11.4%

== Climate ==
Tanagura has a humid subtropical climate (Köppen climate classification Cfa). The average annual temperature in Tanagura is 11.6 °C (52.9 °F). The average annual rainfall is 1,408 mm (55.4 in) with September as the wettest month.

== History ==
The area of present-day Tanagura was part of ancient Mutsu Province. The area formed part of the holdings of Tanagura Domain, in the Edo period. After the Meiji Restoration, it was organized as part Higashishirakawa District within the Nakadōri region of Iwaki Province. Tanagura Town was formed on April 1, 1889, with the creation of the modern municipalities system. The town expanded on January 1, 1950, by the annexation of the neighboring villages of Yashirogawa, Chikatsu, Yamaoka and Takano.

== Economy ==
Tanagura has a mixed economy with agriculture and precision manufacturing predominating.

== Education ==
Tanagura has four public elementary schools and one public junior high school operated by the town government, and one public high school operated by the Fukushima Prefectural Board of Education.

=== High schools ===
- Shumei High School

=== Junior High school ===
- Tanagura Junior High School

=== Elementary schools ===
- Chikatsu Elementary School
- Takano Elementary School
- Tanagura Elementary School
- Yashirogawa Elementary School

== Transportation ==
=== Railway ===
- JR East – Suigun Line
  - Chikatsu - Nakatoyo - Iwaki-Tanakura

=== Highway ===
- National Route 118
- National Route 289

== International relations ==
- Sparta, Greece, friendship city since September 23, 1986
- Lake Macquarie, New South Wales, Australia, since October 8, 2002

== Local attractions ==
- Site of Tanagura Castle, National Historic Site
- Nagare temple ruins, National Historic Site
- Tsutsuwake Shrine
