= Asakawa, Fukushima =

Town in Fukushima Prefecture, Japan

Asakawa 浅川町
- Town
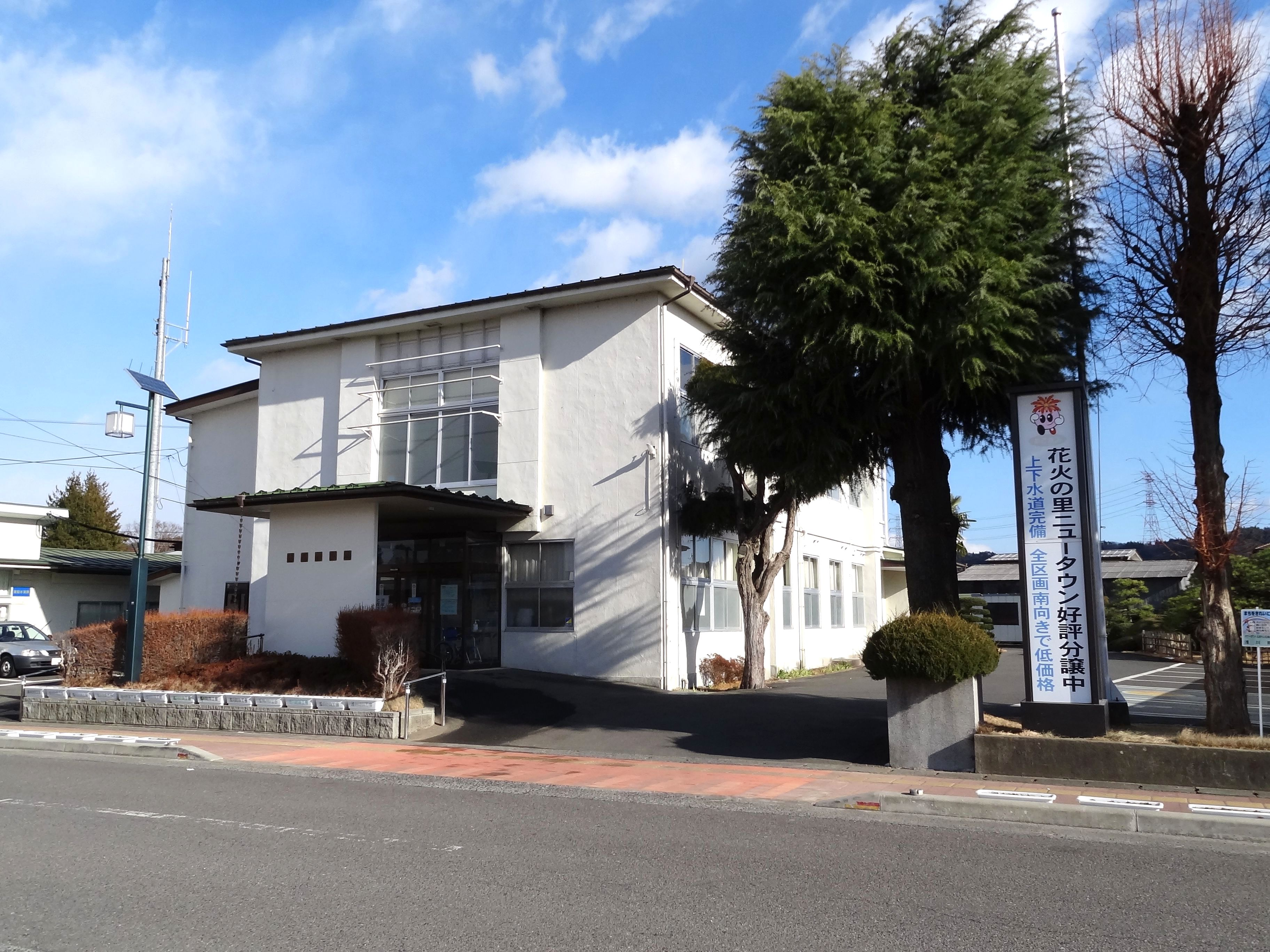
- Asakawa Town Hall

- Flag Seal

- Location of Asakawa in Fukushima Prefecture

- Coordinates: 37°04′51.5″N 140°24′46.3″E
- Country: Japan
- Region: Tōhoku
- Prefecture: Fukushima
- District: Ishikawa

Area
  - Total: 37.43 km^{2} (14.45 sq mi)

Population (March 2020)
  - Total: 6,315
  - Density: 168.7/km^{2} (437.0/sq mi)
- Time zone: UTC+9 (Japan Standard Time)
- Tree: Pinus densiflora
- Flower: Pecteilis radiata
- Bird: Azure-winged magpie
- Phone number: 0247-36-4121
- Address: 112-15 Setoyachi, Asakawa, Asakawa-machi, Ishikawa-gun, Fukushima-ken 963-6204
- Website: Official website

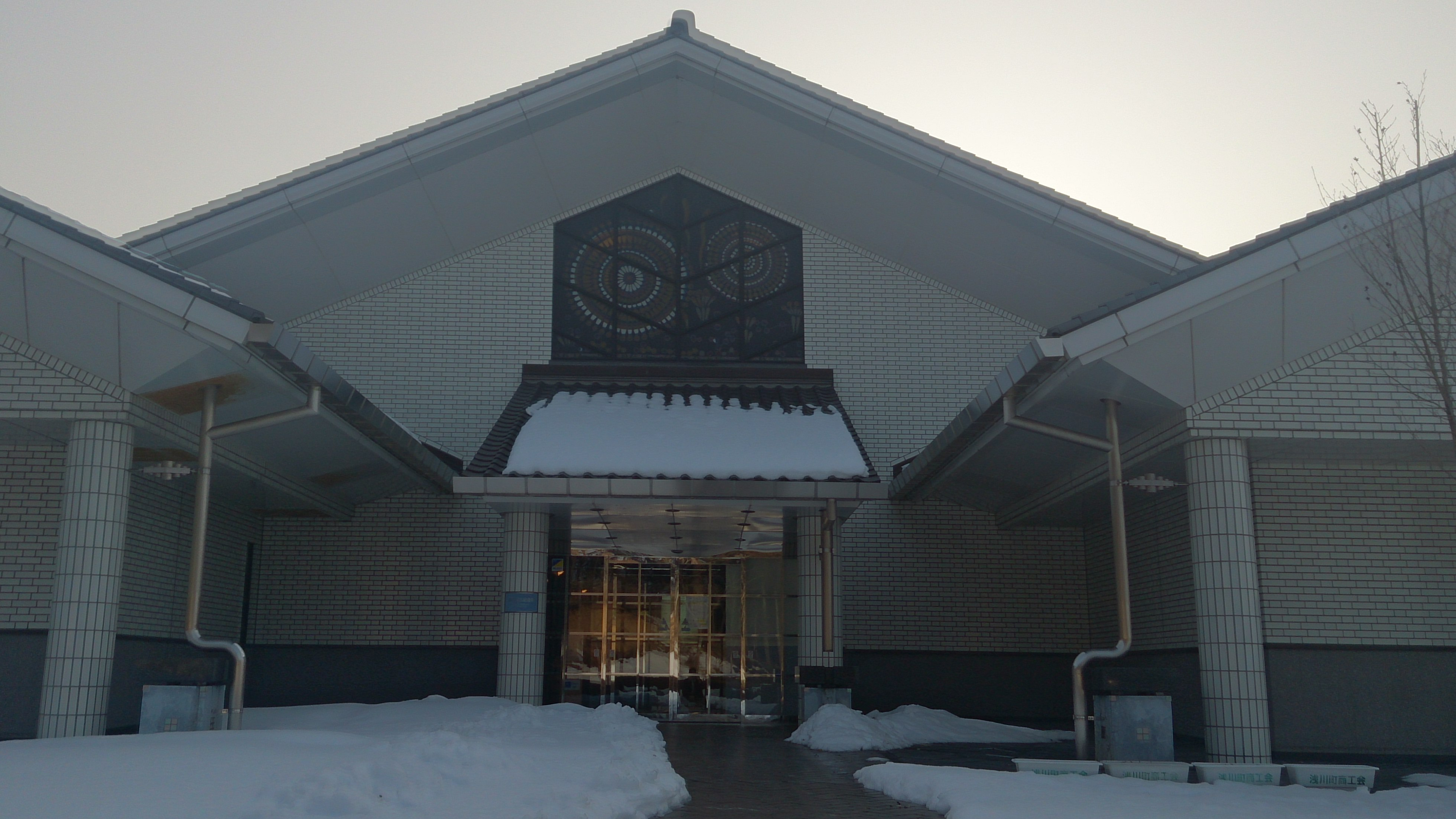
Yoshida Tomizo Memorial Museum

Asakawa (浅川町, Asakawa-machi) is a town located in Fukushima Prefecture, Japan. As of 1 March 2020, the town had an estimated population of 6,036 across 2,070 households, and a population density of 170 persons per km^{2}. The total area of the town was 37.43 square kilometres (14.45 sq mi).

== Geography ==
Asakawa is located in southern portion of Fukushima prefecture in the floodplain of the Abukuma River. Asakawa has a humid climate (Köppen climate classification Cfa). The average annual temperature in Asakawa is 11.6 °C (52.9 °F). The average annual rainfall is 1,386 mm (54.6 in) with September as the wettest month. The temperatures are highest on average in August, at around 23.9 °C (75.0 °F), and lowest in January, at around 0.5 °C (32.9 °F).

=== Neighboring municipalities ===
- Fukushima Prefecture
  - Ishikawa
  - Samegawa
  - Shirakawa
  - Tanagura

== Demographics ==
Per Japanese census data, the population of Asakawa has declined over the past 40 years.

== Demographics ==
Per Japanese census data, the population of Kunimi has been in decline over the past 70 years.

Historical population
Year	Pop.	±%
1950	9,490	—
1960	8,625	−9.1%
1970	7,837	−9.1%
1980	7,488	−4.5%
1990	7,727	+3.2%
2000	7,484	−3.1%
2010	6,888	−8.0%
2020	6,036	−12.4%

== Climate ==
Asakawa has a humid subtropical climate (Köppen climate classification Cfa). The average annual temperature in Asakawa is 11.6 °C (52.9 °F). The average annual rainfall is 1,386 mm (54.6 in) with September being the wettest month. The temperatures are highest on average in August, at around 23.9 °C (75.0 °F), and lowest in January, at around 0.5 °C (32.9 °F).

== History ==
The area of present-day Asakuwa was part of ancient Mutsu Province. The area was mostly tenryō territory under direct control of the Tokugawa Shogunate during the Edo period. After the Meiji Restoration, it was organized as part of Ishikawa District in the Nakadōri region of Iwaki Province. The village of Asakuwa was formed on April 1, 1889, with the creation of the modern municipalities system. It was raised to town status on August 1, 1935. The town expanded on October 1, 1950, by the annexation of the neighboring village of Yamashiraishi.

== Economy ==
The economy of Asakuwa is primarily based on agriculture.

== Education ==
Asakawa has three public elementary schools and one public junior high school operated by the town government. The town does not have a high school.

- Asakawa Middle School
- Asakawa Elementary School
- Asakawa Yamashiraishi Elementary School
- Asakawa Satoshiraishi Elementary School

== Transportation ==
=== Railway ===
JR East – Suigun Line

- Iwaki-Asakawa - Satoshiraishi

=== Highway ===
- National Route 118

== Local attractions ==
- Yoshida Tomizo Memorial Museum

== Noted people from Asakawa ==
- Tomizo Yoshida - pathologist
