= Hanawa, Fukushima =

Hanawa 塙町
- Town
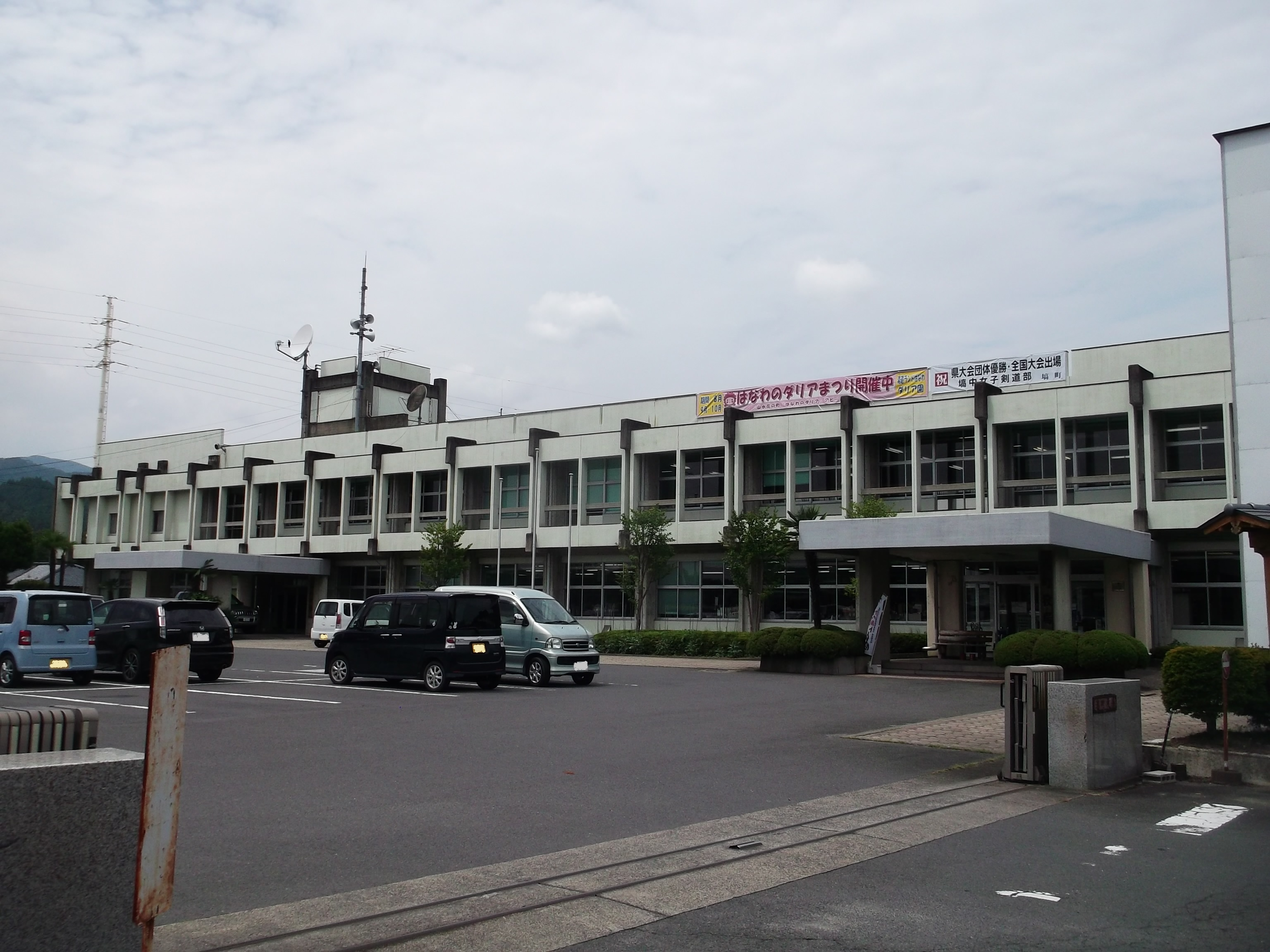
- Hanawa Town Hall

- Flag Seal

- Location of Hanawa in Fukushima Prefecture

- Coordinates: 36°57′26″N 140°24′34.9″E
- Country: Japan
- Region: Tōhoku
- Prefecture: Fukushima
- District: Higashishirakawa

Area
  - Total: 211.41 km^{2} (81.63 sq mi)

Population (January 2020)
  - Total: 8,369
  - Density: 39.59/km^{2} (102.5/sq mi)
- Time zone: UTC+9 (Japan Standard Time)
- Phone number: 0247-43-2111
- Address: 3-21 Hanawa Omachi, Hanawa-machi, Higashishirakawa-gun, Fukushima-ken 963-5405
- Climate: Cfa
- Website: Official website
- Symbols
- Bird: Green pheasant
- Flower: Rhododendron, dahlia
- Tree: Cryptomeria

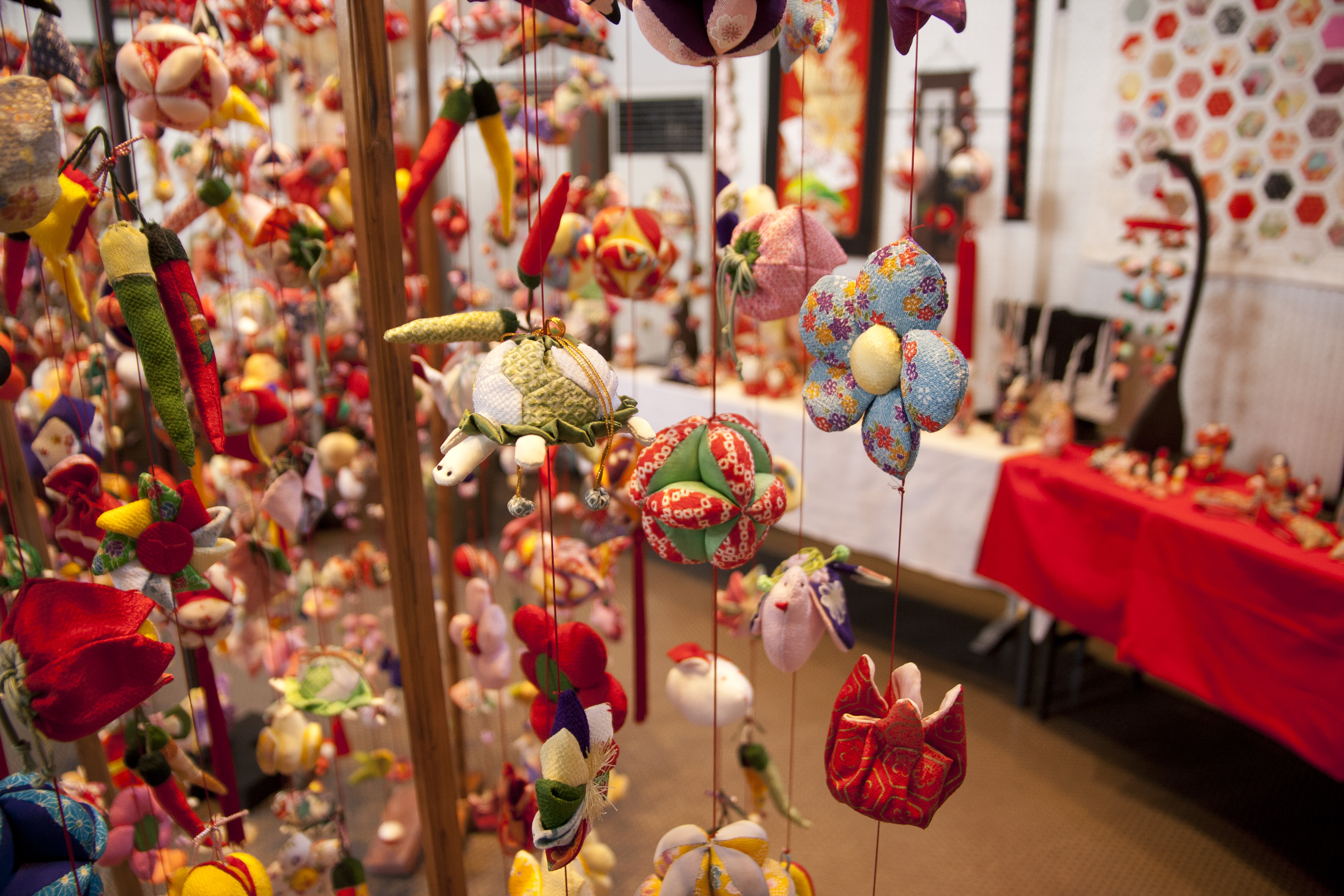
Tsurushi-Hina in Hanawa

Hanawa (塙町, Hanawa-machi) is a town located in Fukushima Prefecture, Japan. As of 1 January 2020, the town had an estimated population of 8,369 in 3301 households, and a population density of 40 persons per km^{2}. The total area of the town was 211.41 square kilometres (81.6 sq mi).

== Geography ==
Hanawa is located in the southernmost portion of Fukushima prefecture, bordering on Ibaraki Prefecture to the south.

- Mountains: Yamizozan (1021.8m), Yoneyama
- Rivers: Kuji River

=== Climate ===
Hanawa has a humid subtropical climate (Köppen climate classification Cfa). The average annual temperature in Hanawa is 12.0 °C (53.6 °F). The average annual rainfall is 1,420 mm (56 in) with September as the wettest month. The temperatures are highest on average in August, at around 23.9 °C (75.0 °F), and lowest in January, at around 1.1 °C (34.0 °F).

Climate data for Hanawa (1991−2020 normals, extremes 1976−present)
Month	Jan	Feb	Mar	Apr	May	Jun	Jul	Aug	Sep	Oct	Nov	Dec	Year
Record high °C (°F)	16.9 (62.4)	20.7 (69.3)	24.6 (76.3)	30.7 (87.3)	33.6 (92.5)	34.8 (94.6)	35.7 (96.3)	36.5 (97.7)	34.1 (93.4)	30.0 (86.0)	23.3 (73.9)	21.7 (71.1)	36.5 (97.7)
Mean daily maximum °C (°F)	6.2 (43.2)	7.2 (45.0)	11.1 (52.0)	17.0 (62.6)	22.0 (71.6)	24.9 (76.8)	28.4 (83.1)	29.7 (85.5)	25.6 (78.1)	19.9 (67.8)	14.3 (57.7)	8.8 (47.8)	17.9 (64.3)
Daily mean °C (°F)	0.2 (32.4)	1.1 (34.0)	4.6 (40.3)	10.3 (50.5)	15.7 (60.3)	19.5 (67.1)	23.2 (73.8)	24.1 (75.4)	20.2 (68.4)	14.1 (57.4)	7.8 (46.0)	2.5 (36.5)	11.9 (53.5)
Mean daily minimum °C (°F)	−4.8 (23.4)	−4.1 (24.6)	−1.2 (29.8)	3.8 (38.8)	9.9 (49.8)	15.1 (59.2)	19.4 (66.9)	20.3 (68.5)	16.2 (61.2)	9.5 (49.1)	2.6 (36.7)	−2.4 (27.7)	7.0 (44.6)
Record low °C (°F)	−14.7 (5.5)	−16.2 (2.8)	−14.2 (6.4)	−6.3 (20.7)	−0.7 (30.7)	4.2 (39.6)	10.0 (50.0)	11.6 (52.9)	4.4 (39.9)	−1.8 (28.8)	−6.6 (20.1)	−11.6 (11.1)	−16.2 (2.8)
Average precipitation mm (inches)	37.7 (1.48)	34.9 (1.37)	86.3 (3.40)	108.0 (4.25)	123.5 (4.86)	145.5 (5.73)	215.4 (8.48)	179.5 (7.07)	199.7 (7.86)	159.2 (6.27)	72.5 (2.85)	43.0 (1.69)	1,405.1 (55.32)
Average precipitation days (≥ 1.0 mm)	4.6	5.0	8.6	10.1	11.2	13.1	15.0	12.2	12.8	10.0	7.1	5.3	115
Mean monthly sunshine hours	182.8	170.3	188.7	189.0	188.6	138.5	137.7	163.3	126.7	136.0	153.5	165.7	1,940.8
Source: Japan Meteorological Agency

=== Neighboring municipalities ===
- Fukushima Prefecture
  - Samegawa
  - Tanagura
  - Yamatsuri
- Ibaraki Prefecture
  - Hitachiōta
  - Kitaibaraki
  - Takahagi

== Demographics ==
Per Japanese census data, the population of Hanawa has been declining over the past 60 years.

Historical population
Year	Pop.	±%
1960	15,830	—
1970	13,592	−14.1%
1980	12,060	−11.3%
1990	11,926	−1.1%
2000	11,296	−5.3%
2010	9,884	−12.5%
2020	8,302	−16.0%

== History ==
The area of present-day Hanawa was part of ancient Mutsu Province. Part of the area formed part of the holdings of Tanagura Domain, and part was tenryō territory under direct control of the Tokugawa Shogunate during the Edo period. After the Meiji Restoration, it was organized as part of Higashishirakawa District within the Nakadōri region of Iwaki Province.

Tsunetoyo Village was formed on April 1, 1889, with the creation of the modern municipalities system. It was elevated to town status on November 3, 1948, changing its name to Hanawa at that time. Hanawa annexed the neighboring villages of Sasahara, Ishii and Takagi in March 1955.

== Economy ==
The economy of Hanawa is primarily agricultural. A major crop is Konjac.

== Education ==
Hanawa has three public elementary schools and one combined public middle/high school operated by the town government.

== Transportation ==
=== Railway ===
- JR East – Suigun Line
  - Iwaki-Hanawa

=== Highway ===
- National Route 118
- National Route 289
- National Route 349

== Local attractions ==
- Abukumo Kogen Art Museum
