= Hirata, Fukushima =

Hirata 平田村
- Village
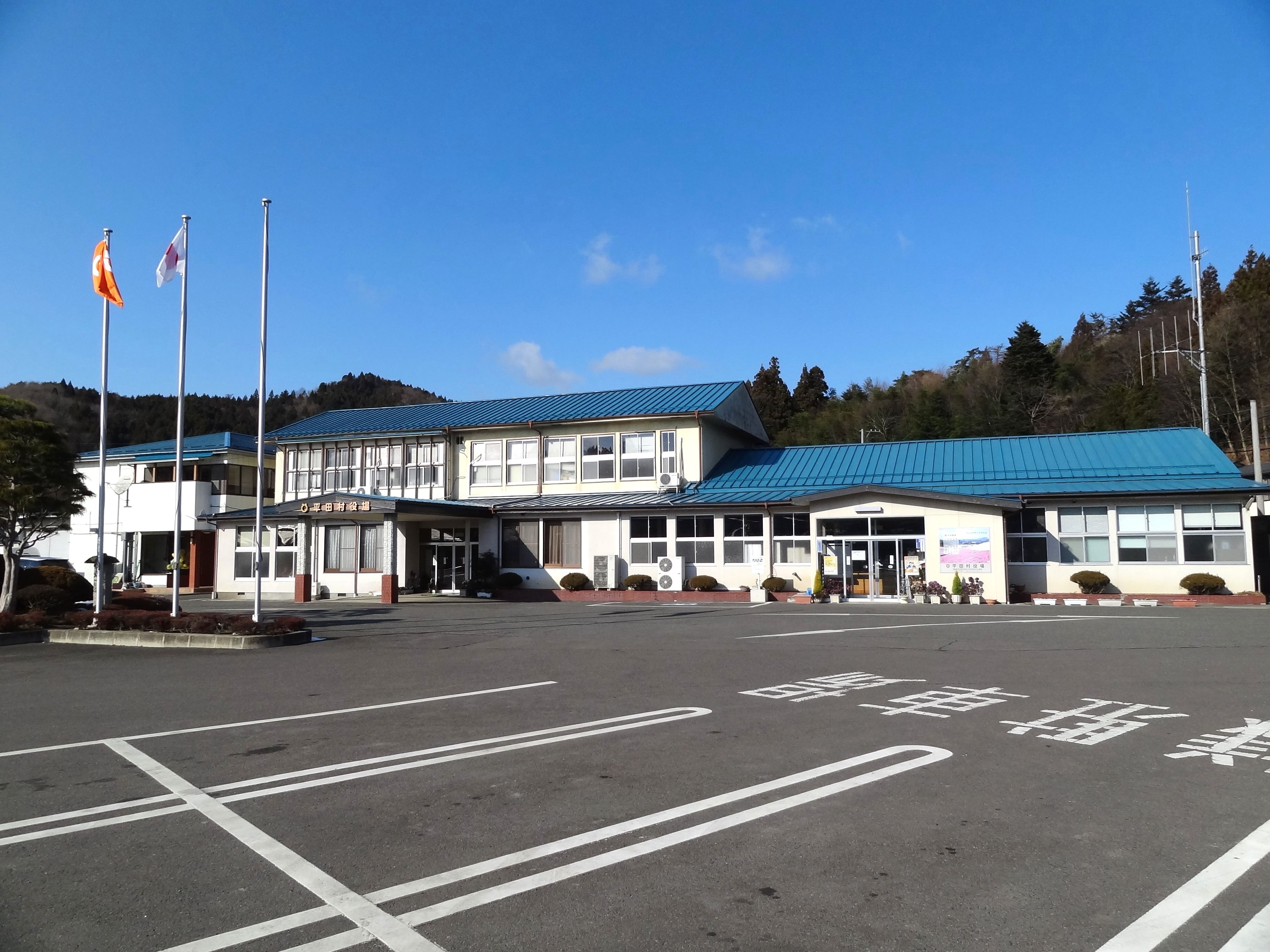
- Hirata Village Hall

- Flag Seal

- Location of Hirata in Fukushima Prefecture

- Coordinates: 37°13′19.4″N 140°34′32.9″E
- Country: Japan
- Region: Tōhoku
- Prefecture: Fukushima
- District: Ishikawa

Area
  - Total: 93.42 km^{2} (36.07 sq mi)

Population (January 31, 2020)
  - Total: 5,935
  - Density: 63.53/km^{2} (164.5/sq mi)
- Time zone: UTC+9 (Japan Standard Time)
- Tree: Pinus densiflora
- Flower: Dandelion
- Bird: Oriental turtle dove
- Phone number: 0247-55-3111
- Address: 34 Nagata Hiromachi, Hirata-mura, Ishikawa-gun, Fukushima-ken 963-8292
- Website: Official website

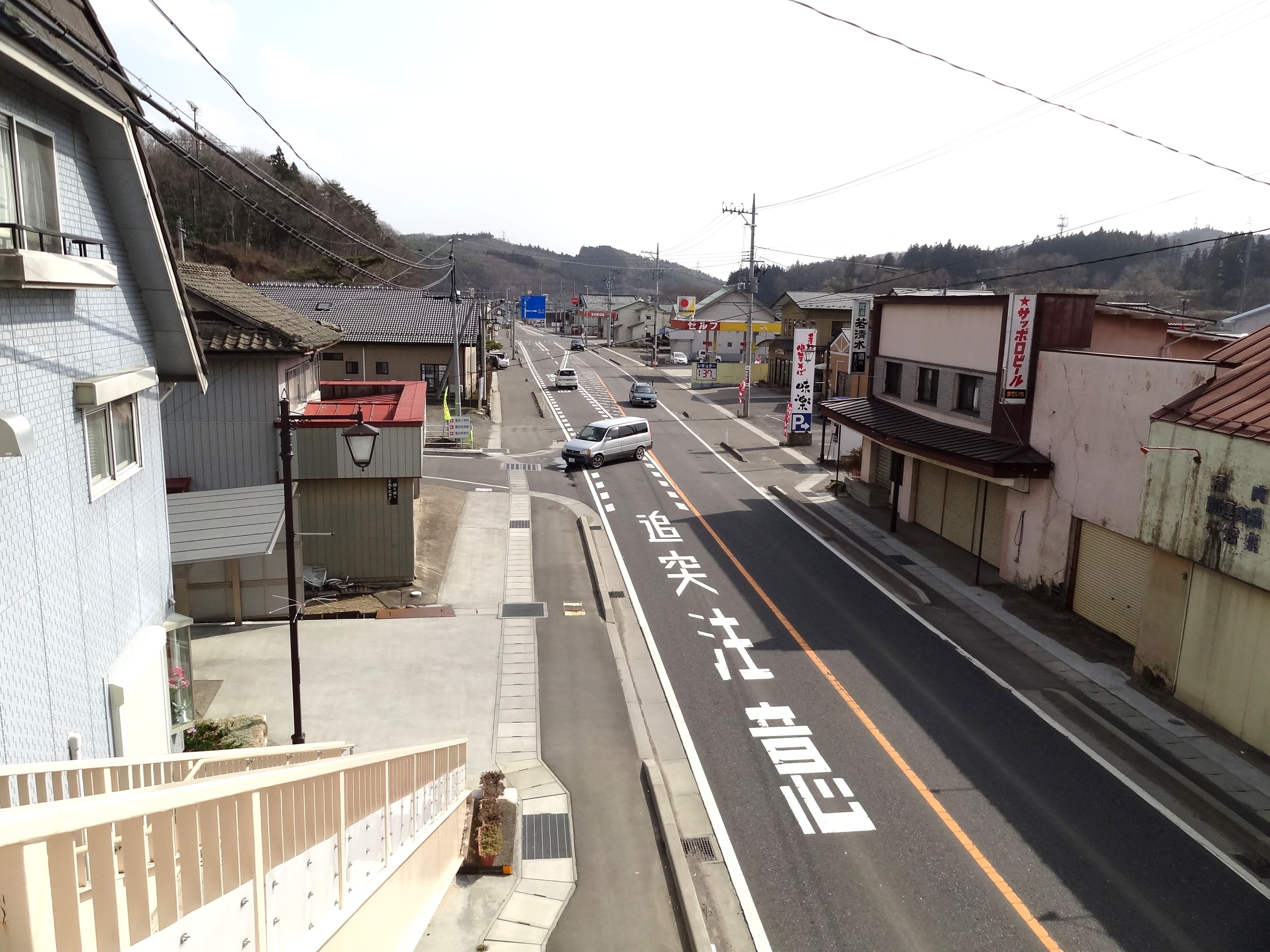
Central Hirata

Hirata (平田村, Hirata-mura) is a village located in Fukushima Prefecture, Japan. As of 31 January 2020, the village had an estimated population of 5,935 in 2016 households, and a population density of 66 persons per km^{2}. The total area of the village was 93.42 square kilometres (36.1 sq mi).

== Geography ==
Hirata is located in southeast Fukushima prefecture, approximately halfway between the cities of Iwaki and Kōriyama. The landscape consists of rolling hills with an altitude of between 500 and 700 meters.

- Rivers: Abukuma River

=== Neighboring municipalities ===
- Fukushima Prefecture
  - Furudono
  - Ishikawa
  - Iwaki
  - Kōriyama
  - Ono
  - Sukagawa
  - Tamakawa

== Demographics ==
Per Japanese census data, the population of Hirata peaked at around the year 1950 and has been gradually declining since.

Historical population
Year	Pop.	±%
1920	5,835	—
1930	7,120	+22.0%
1940	7,962	+11.8%
1950	10,338	+29.8%
1960	10,525	+1.8%
1970	9,359	−11.1%
1980	8,804	−5.9%
1990	8,523	−3.2%
2000	7,910	−7.2%
2010	6,921	−12.5%
2020	5,826	−15.8%

== Climate ==
Hirata has a humid subtropical climate (Köppen climate classification Cfa). The average annual temperature in Hirata is 10.6 °C (51.1 °F). The average annual rainfall is 1,412 mm (55.6 in) with September as the wettest month. The temperatures are highest on average in August, at around 23.0 °C (73.4 °F), and lowest in January, at around −0.6 °C (30.9 °F).

== History ==
The area of present-day Hirata was part of ancient Mutsu Province. During the Edo period it was mostly the territory of Tsuchiura Domain. After the Meiji Restoration, it was organized as part of Ishikawa District within the Nakadōri region of Iwaki Province. The villages of Odaira and Yomogida were created on April 1, 1889 with the establishment of the modern municipalities system. The two villages merged on March 31, 1955 to form the village of Hirata.

== Economy ==
The economy of Hirata is primarily based on agriculture.

== Education ==
Hiram has two public elementary schools and one public junior high school operated by the village government, and one public high school operated by the Fukushima Prefectural Department of Education.

- Fukushima Prefectural Ono Higher Hirata High School
- Hirata Yomogida High School
- Hirata Odaira Middle School
- Hirata Yomogida School
- Hirata Odaira Elementary School

== Transportation ==
=== Railway ===
- Hirata does not have any passenger train service.

=== Highway ===
- Abukuma Kōgen Road
- National Route 49
- National Route 349

== Local attractions ==
- Komagata Jangara Nembutsu Folk Dance
- Shibazakura Matsuri
- Site of Yomogida Castle
