= List of towns in Japan =

A town (町; chō or machi) is a local administrative unit in Japan. It is a local public body along with prefecture (ken or other equivalents), city (shi), and village (mura). Geographically, a town is contained within a district.

The same word (町; machi or chō) is also used in names of smaller regions, usually a part of a ward in a city. This is a legacy of when smaller towns were formed on the outskirts of a city, only to eventually merge into it.

== Towns ==
Town	Japanese	Prefecture	District	Area (km^{2})
Nanporo	南幌町	Hokkaido	Sorachi	81.36
Naie	奈井江町	Hokkaido	Sorachi	88.19
Kamisunagawa	上砂川町	Hokkaido	Sorachi	39.98
Yuni	由仁町	Hokkaido	Yūbari	133.74
Naganuma	長沼町	Hokkaido	Yūbari	168.52
Kuriyama	栗山町	Hokkaido	Yūbari	203.93
Tsukigata	月形町	Hokkaido	Kabato	150.40
Urausu	浦臼町	Hokkaido	Kabato	101.83
Shintotsukawa	新十津川町	Hokkaido	Kabato	495.47
Moseushi	妹背牛町	Hokkaido	Uryū	48.64
Chippubetsu	秩父別町	Hokkaido	Uryū	47.18
Uryū	雨竜町	Hokkaido	Uryū	191.15
Hokuryū	北竜町	Hokkaido	Uryū	158.70
Numata	沼田町	Hokkaido	Uryū	283.35
Tōbetsu	当別町	Hokkaido	Ishikari	422.86
Suttsu	寿都町	Hokkaido	Suttsu	95.24
Kuromatsunai	黒松内町	Hokkaido	Suttsu	345.65
Rankoshi	蘭越町	Hokkaido	Isoya	449.78
Niseko	ニセコ町	Hokkaido	Abuta	197.13
Kimobetsu	喜茂別町	Hokkaido	Abuta	189.41
Kyōgoku	京極町	Hokkaido	Abuta	231.49
Kutchan	倶知安町	Hokkaido	Abuta	261.34
Kyōwa	共和町	Hokkaido	Iwanai	304.91
Iwanai	岩内町	Hokkaido	Iwanai	70.60
Shakotan	積丹町	Hokkaido	Shakotan	238.14
Furubira	古平町	Hokkaido	Furubira	188.36
Niki	仁木町	Hokkaido	Yoichi	167.96
Yoichi	余市町	Hokkaido	Yoichi	140.59
Toyoura	豊浦町	Hokkaido	Abuta	233.57
Tōyako	洞爺湖町	Hokkaido	Abuta	180.81
Sōbetsu	壮瞥町	Hokkaido	Usu	205.01
Shiraoi	白老町	Hokkaido	Shiraoi	425.64
Atsuma	厚真町	Hokkaido	Yūfutsu	404.61
Abira	安平町	Hokkaido	Yūfutsu	237.16
Mukawa	むかわ町	Hokkaido	Yūfutsu	711.36
Hidaka	日高町	Hokkaido	Saru	992.11
Biratori	平取町	Hokkaido	Saru	743.09
Niikappu	新冠町	Hokkaido	Niikappu	585.81
Urakawa	浦河町	Hokkaido	Urakawa	694.26
Samani	様似町	Hokkaido	Samani	364.30
Erimo	えりも町	Hokkaido	Horoizumi	284.00
Shinhidaka	新ひだか町	Hokkaido	Hidaka	1,147.55
Matsumae	松前町	Hokkaido	Matsumae	293.25
Fukushima	福島町	Hokkaido	Matsumae	187.28
Shiriuchi	知内町	Hokkaido	Kamiiso	196.75
Kikonai	木古内町	Hokkaido	Kamiiso	221.87
Nanae	七飯町	Hokkaido	Kameda	216.75
Shikabe	鹿部町	Hokkaido	Kayabe	110.64
Mori	森町	Hokkaido	Kayabe	368.79
Yakumo	八雲町	Hokkaido	Futami	956.02
Oshamambe	長万部町	Hokkaido	Yamakoshi	310.76
Esashi	江差町	Hokkaido	Hiyama	109.53
Kaminokuni	上ノ国町	Hokkaido	Hiyama	547.71
Assabu	厚沢部町	Hokkaido	Hiyama	460.58
Otobe	乙部町	Hokkaido	Nishi	162.59
Okushiri	奥尻町	Hokkaido	Okushiri	142.98
Imakane	今金町	Hokkaido	Setana	568.25
Setana	せたな町	Hokkaido	Kudō	638.66
Takasu	鷹栖町	Hokkaido	Kamikawa (Ishikari)	139.42
Higashikagura	東神楽町	Hokkaido	Kamikawa (Ishikari)	68.50
Tōma	当麻町	Hokkaido	Kamikawa (Ishikari)	204.90
Pippu	比布町	Hokkaido	Kamikawa (Ishikari)	86.90
Aibetsu	愛別町	Hokkaido	Kamikawa (Ishikari)	250.13
Kamikawa	上川町	Hokkaido	Kamikawa (Ishikari)	1,049.47
Higashikawa	東川町	Hokkaido	Kamikawa (Ishikari)	247.30
Biei	美瑛町	Hokkaido	Kamikawa (Ishikari)	676.78
Kamifurano	上富良野町	Hokkaido	Sorachi	237.10
Nakafurano	中富良野町	Hokkaido	Sorachi	108.65
Minamifurano	南富良野町	Hokkaido	Sorachi	665.54
Horokanai	幌加内町	Hokkaido	Uryū	767.04
Wassamu	和寒町	Hokkaido	Kamikawa (Teshio)	225.11
Kenbuchi	剣淵町	Hokkaido	Kamikawa (Teshio)	130.99
Shimokawa	下川町	Hokkaido	Kamikawa (Teshio)	644.20
Bifuka	美深町	Hokkaido	Nakagawa (Teshio)	672.09
Nakagawa	中川町	Hokkaido	Nakagawa (Teshio)	594.74
Mashike	増毛町	Hokkaido	Mashike	369.71
Obira	小平町	Hokkaido	Rumoi	627.22
Tomamae	苫前町	Hokkaido	Tomamae	454.60
Haboro	羽幌町	Hokkaido	Tomamae	472.65
Enbetsu	遠別町	Hokkaido	Teshio	590.80
Teshio	天塩町	Hokkaido	Teshio	353.56
Hamatonbetsu	浜頓別町	Hokkaido	Esashi	401.64
Nakatonbetsu	中頓別町	Hokkaido	Esashi	398.51
Esashi	枝幸町	Hokkaido	Esashi	1,115.93
Toyotomi	豊富町	Hokkaido	Teshio	520.69
Horonobe	幌延町	Hokkaido	Teshio	574.10
Rebun	礼文町	Hokkaido	Rebun	81.64
Rishiri	利尻町	Hokkaido	Rishiri	76.51
Rishirifuji	利尻富士町	Hokkaido	Rishiri	105.61
Bihoro	美幌町	Hokkaido	Abashiri	438.41
Tsubetsu	津別町	Hokkaido	Abashiri	716.80
Ōzora	大空町	Hokkaido	Abashiri	343.66
Shari	斜里町	Hokkaido	Shari	737.12
Kiyosato	清里町	Hokkaido	Shari	402.76
Koshimizu	小清水町	Hokkaido	Shari	286.89
Kunneppu	訓子府町	Hokkaido	Tokoro	190.95
Oketo	置戸町	Hokkaido	Tokoro	527.27
Saroma	佐呂間町	Hokkaido	Tokoro	404.94
Engaru	遠軽町	Hokkaido	Monbetsu	1,332.45
Yūbetsu	湧別町	Hokkaido	Monbetsu	505.79
Takinoue	滝上町	Hokkaido	Monbetsu	766.89
Okoppe	興部町	Hokkaido	Monbetsu	362.54
Ōmu	雄武町	Hokkaido	Monbetsu	636.86
Otofuke	音更町	Hokkaido	Katō	466.02
Shihoro	士幌町	Hokkaido	Katō	259.19
Kamishihoro	上士幌町	Hokkaido	Katō	694.23
Shikaoi	鹿追町	Hokkaido	Katō	402.88
Shintoku	新得町	Hokkaido	Kamikawa (Tokachi)	1,063.83
Shimizu	清水町	Hokkaido	Kamikawa (Tokachi)	402.25
Memuro	芽室町	Hokkaido	Kasai	513.76
Taiki	大樹町	Hokkaido	Hiroo	815.68
Hiroo	広尾町	Hokkaido	Hiroo	596.54
Makubetsu	幕別町	Hokkaido	Nakagawa (Tokachi)	477.64
Ikeda	池田町	Hokkaido	Nakagawa (Tokachi)	371.79
Toyokoro	豊頃町	Hokkaido	Nakagawa (Tokachi)	536.71
Honbetsu	本別町	Hokkaido	Nakagawa (Tokachi)	391.91
Ashoro	足寄町	Hokkaido	Ashoro	1,408.04
Rikubetsu	陸別町	Hokkaido	Ashoro	608.90
Urahoro	浦幌町	Hokkaido	Tokachi	729.85
Kushiro	釧路町	Hokkaido	Kushiro	252.66
Akkeshi	厚岸町	Hokkaido	Akkeshi	739.26
Hamanaka	浜中町	Hokkaido	Akkeshi	423.63
Shibecha	標茶町	Hokkaido	Kawakami	1,099.37
Teshikaga	弟子屈町	Hokkaido	Kawakami	774.33
Shiranuka	白糠町	Hokkaido	Shiranuka	773.53
Betsukai	別海町	Hokkaido	Notsuke	1,319.63
Nakashibetsu	中標津町	Hokkaido	Shibetsu	684.87
Shibetsu	標津町	Hokkaido	Shibetsu	624.68
Rausu	羅臼町	Hokkaido	Menashi	397.72
Hiranai	平内町	Aomori	Higashitsugaru	217.09
Imabetsu	今別町	Aomori	Higashitsugaru	125.27
Sotogahama	外ヶ浜町	Aomori	Higashitsugaru	230.29
Ajigasawa	鰺ヶ沢町	Aomori	Nishitsugaru	343.08
Fukaura	深浦町	Aomori	Nishitsugaru	488.89
Fujisaki	藤崎町	Aomori	Minamitsugaru	37.29
Ōwani	大鰐町	Aomori	Minamitsugaru	163.43
Itayanagi	板柳町	Aomori	Kitatsugaru	41.88
Tsuruta	鶴田町	Aomori	Kitatsugaru	46.43
Nakadomari	中泊町	Aomori	Kitatsugaru	216.32
Noheji	野辺地町	Aomori	Kamikita	81.68
Shichinohe	七戸町	Aomori	Kamikita	337.23
Rokunohe	六戸町	Aomori	Kamikita	83.89
Yokohama	横浜町	Aomori	Kamikita	126.38
Tōhoku	東北町	Aomori	Kamikita	326.50
Oirase	おいらせ町	Aomori	Kamikita	71.96
Ōma	大間町	Aomori	Shimokita	52.10
Sannohe	三戸町	Aomori	Sannohe	151.79
Gonohe	五戸町	Aomori	Sannohe	177.67
Takko	田子町	Aomori	Sannohe	241.98
Nanbu	南部町	Aomori	Sannohe	153.12
Hashikami	階上町	Aomori	Sannohe	94.01
Shizukuishi	雫石町	Iwate	Iwate	608.82
Kuzumaki	葛巻町	Iwate	Iwate	434.96
Iwate	岩手町	Iwate	Iwate	360.46
Shiwa	紫波町	Iwate	Shiwa	238.98
Yahaba	矢巾町	Iwate	Shiwa	67.32
Nishiwaga	西和賀町	Iwate	Waga	590.74
Kanegasaki	金ケ崎町	Iwate	Isawa	179.76
Hiraizumi	平泉町	Iwate	Nishiiwai	63.39
Sumita	住田町	Iwate	Kesen	334.84
Ōtsuchi	大槌町	Iwate	Kamihei	200.42
Yamada	山田町	Iwate	Shimohei	262.81
Iwaizumi	岩泉町	Iwate	Shimohei	992.36
Karumai	軽米町	Iwate	Kunohe	245.82
Hirono	洋野町	Iwate	Kunohe	302.92
Ichinohe	一戸町	Iwate	Ninohe	300.03
Zaō	蔵王町	Miyagi	Katta	152.83
Shichikashuku	七ヶ宿町	Miyagi	Katta	263.09
Ōgawara	大河原町	Miyagi	Shibata	24.99
Murata	村田町	Miyagi	Shibata	78.38
Shibata	柴田町	Miyagi	Shibata	54.03
Kawasaki	川崎町	Miyagi	Shibata	270.77
Marumori	丸森町	Miyagi	Igu	273.30
Watari	亘理町	Miyagi	Watari	73.60
Yamamoto	山元町	Miyagi	Watari	64.58
Matsushima	松島町	Miyagi	Miyagi	53.56
Shichigahama	七ヶ浜町	Miyagi	Miyagi	13.19
Rifu	利府町	Miyagi	Miyagi	44.89
Taiwa	大和町	Miyagi	Kurokawa	225.49
Ōsato	大郷町	Miyagi	Kurokawa	82.01
Shikama	色麻町	Miyagi	Kami	109.28
Kami	加美町	Miyagi	Kami	460.67
Wakuya	涌谷町	Miyagi	Tōda	82.16
Misato	美里町	Miyagi	Tōda	74.90
Onagawa	女川町	Miyagi	Oshika	65.35
Minamisanriku	南三陸町	Miyagi	Motoyoshi	163.40
Kosaka	小坂町	Akita	Kazuno	201.70
Fujisato	藤里町	Akita	Yamamoto	282.13
Mitane	三種町	Akita	Yamamoto	247.98
Happō	八峰町	Akita	Yamamoto	234.14
Gojōme	五城目町	Akita	Minamiakita	214.92
Hachirōgata	八郎潟町	Akita	Minamiakita	17.00
Ikawa	井川町	Akita	Minamiakita	47.95
Misato	美郷町	Akita	Senboku	168.34
Ugo	羽後町	Akita	Ogachi	230.78
Yamanobe	山辺町	Yamagata	Higashimurayama	61.45
Nakayama	中山町	Yamagata	Higashimurayama	31.15
Kahoku	河北町	Yamagata	Nishimurayama	52.45
Nishikawa	西川町	Yamagata	Nishimurayama	393.19
Asahi	朝日町	Yamagata	Nishimurayama	196.81
Ōe	大江町	Yamagata	Nishimurayama	154.08
Ōishida	大石田町	Yamagata	Kitamurayama	79.54
Kaneyama	金山町	Yamagata	Mogami	161.67
Mogami	最上町	Yamagata	Mogami	330.37
Funagata	舟形町	Yamagata	Mogami	119.04
Mamurogawa	真室川町	Yamagata	Mogami	374.22
Takahata	高畠町	Yamagata	Higashiokitama	180.26
Kawanishi	川西町	Yamagata	Higashiokitama	166.60
Oguni	小国町	Yamagata	Nishiokitama	737.56
Shirataka	白鷹町	Yamagata	Nishiokitama	157.71
Iide	飯豊町	Yamagata	Nishiokitama	329.41
Mikawa	三川町	Yamagata	Higashitagawa	33.22
Shōnai	庄内町	Yamagata	Higashitagawa	249.17
Yuza	遊佐町	Yamagata	Akumi	208.39
Koori	桑折町	Fukushima	Date	42.97
Kunimi	国見町	Fukushima	Date	37.95
Kawamata	川俣町	Fukushima	Date	127.70
Kagamiishi	鏡石町	Fukushima	Iwase	31.30
Shimogō	下郷町	Fukushima	Minamiaizu	317.04
Tadami	只見町	Fukushima	Minamiaizu	747.56
Minamiaizu	南会津町	Fukushima	Minamiaizu	886.47
Nishiaizu	西会津町	Fukushima	Yama	298.18
Bandai	磐梯町	Fukushima	Yama	59.77
Inawashiro	猪苗代町	Fukushima	Yama	394.85
Aizubange	会津坂下町	Fukushima	Kawanuma	91.59
Yanaizu	柳津町	Fukushima	Kawanuma	175.82
Mishima	三島町	Fukushima	Ōnuma	90.81
Kaneyama	金山町	Fukushima	Ōnuma	293.92
Aizumisato	会津美里町	Fukushima	Ōnuma	276.33
Yabuki	矢吹町	Fukushima	Nishishirakawa	60.40
Tanagura	棚倉町	Fukushima	Higashishirakawa	159.93
Yamatsuri	矢祭町	Fukushima	Higashishirakawa	118.27
Hanawa	塙町	Fukushima	Higashishirakawa	211.41
Ishikawa	石川町	Fukushima	Ishikawa	115.71
Asakawa	浅川町	Fukushima	Ishikawa	37.43
Furudono	古殿町	Fukushima	Ishikawa	163.29
Miharu	三春町	Fukushima	Tamura	72.76
Ono	小野町	Fukushima	Tamura	125.18
Hirono	広野町	Fukushima	Futaba	58.69
Naraha	楢葉町	Fukushima	Futaba	103.64
Tomioka	富岡町	Fukushima	Futaba	68.39
Ōkuma	大熊町	Fukushima	Futaba	78.71
Futaba	双葉町	Fukushima	Futaba	51.42
Namie	浪江町	Fukushima	Futaba	223.14
Shinchi	新地町	Fukushima	Sōma	46.53
Ibaraki	茨城町	Ibaraki	Higashiibaraki	121.58
Ōarai	大洗町	Ibaraki	Higashiibaraki	23.74
Shirosato	城里町	Ibaraki	Higashiibaraki	161.80
Daigo	大子町	Ibaraki	Kuji	325.76
Ami	阿見町	Ibaraki	Inashiki	71.40
Kawachi	河内町	Ibaraki	Inashiki	44.30
Yachiyo	八千代町	Ibaraki	Yūki	58.99
Goka	五霞町	Ibaraki	Sashima	23.11
Sakai	境町	Ibaraki	Sashima	46.59
Tone	利根町	Ibaraki	Kitasōma	24.90
Kaminokawa	上三川町	Tochigi	Kawachi	54.39
Mashiko	益子町	Tochigi	Haga	89.40
Motegi	茂木町	Tochigi	Haga	172.69
Ichikai	市貝町	Tochigi	Haga	64.25
Haga	芳賀町	Tochigi	Haga	70.16
Mibu	壬生町	Tochigi	Shimotsuga	61.06
Nogi	野木町	Tochigi	Shimotsuga	30.26
Shioya	塩谷町	Tochigi	Shioya	176.06
Takanezawa	高根沢町	Tochigi	Shioya	70.87
Nasu	那須町	Tochigi	Nasu	372.34
Nakagawa	那珂川町	Tochigi	Nasu	192.78
Yoshioka	吉岡町	Gunma	Kitagunma	20.46
Kanna	神流町	Gunma	Tano	114.60
Shimonita	下仁田町	Gunma	Kanra	188.38
Kanra	甘楽町	Gunma	Kanra	58.61
Nakanojō	中之条町	Gunma	Agatsuma	439.28
Naganohara	長野原町	Gunma	Agatsuma	133.85
Kusatsu	草津町	Gunma	Agatsuma	49.75
Higashiagatsuma	東吾妻町	Gunma	Agatsuma	253.91
Minakami	みなかみ町	Gunma	Tone	781.08
Tamamura	玉村町	Gunma	Sawa	25.78
Itakura	板倉町	Gunma	Ōra	41.86
Meiwa	明和町	Gunma	Ōra	19.64
Chiyoda	千代田町	Gunma	Ōra	21.73
Ōizumi	大泉町	Gunma	Ōra	18.03
Ōra	邑楽町	Gunma	Ōra	31.11
Ina	伊奈町	Saitama	Kitaadachi	14.79
Miyoshi	三芳町	Saitama	Iruma	15.33
Moroyama	毛呂山町	Saitama	Iruma	34.07
Ogose	越生町	Saitama	Iruma	40.39
Namegawa	滑川町	Saitama	Hiki	29.68
Ranzan	嵐山町	Saitama	Hiki	29.92
Ogawa	小川町	Saitama	Hiki	60.36
Kawajima	川島町	Saitama	Hiki	41.63
Yoshimi	吉見町	Saitama	Hiki	38.64
Hatoyama	鳩山町	Saitama	Hiki	25.73
Tokigawa	ときがわ町	Saitama	Hiki	55.90
Yokoze	横瀬町	Saitama	Chichibu	49.36
Minano	皆野町	Saitama	Chichibu	63.74
Nagatoro	長瀞町	Saitama	Chichibu	30.43
Ogano	小鹿野町	Saitama	Chichibu	171.26
Misato	美里町	Saitama	Kodama	33.41
Kamikawa	神川町	Saitama	Kodama	47.40
Kamisato	上里町	Saitama	Kodama	29.18
Yorii	寄居町	Saitama	Ōsato	64.25
Miyashiro	宮代町	Saitama	Minamisaitama	15.95
Sugito	杉戸町	Saitama	Kitakatsushika	30.03
Matsubushi	松伏町	Saitama	Kitakatsushika	16.20
Shisui	酒々井町	Chiba	Inba	19.01
Sakae	栄町	Chiba	Inba	32.51
Kōzaki	神崎町	Chiba	Katori	19.90
Tako	多古町	Chiba	Katori	72.80
Tōnoshō	東庄町	Chiba	Katori	46.25
Kujūkuri	九十九里町	Chiba	Sanbu	24.45
Shibayama	芝山町	Chiba	Sanbu	43.24
Yokoshibahikari	横芝光町	Chiba	Sanbu	67.01
Ichinomiya	一宮町	Chiba	Chōsei	22.97
Mutsuzawa	睦沢町	Chiba	Chōsei	35.59
Shirako	白子町	Chiba	Chōsei	27.50
Nagara	長柄町	Chiba	Chōsei	47.11
Chōnan	長南町	Chiba	Chōsei	65.51
Ōtaki	大多喜町	Chiba	Isumi	129.87
Onjuku	御宿町	Chiba	Isumi	24.86
Kyonan	鋸南町	Chiba	Awa	45.19
Mizuho	瑞穂町	Tokyo	Nishitama	16.85
Hinode	日の出町	Tokyo	Nishitama	28.07
Okutama	奥多摩町	Tokyo	Nishitama	225.53
Ōshima	大島町	Tokyo	(Ōshima)	90.76
Hachijō	八丈町	Tokyo	(Hachijō)	72.21
Aikawa	愛川町	Kanagawa	Aikō	34.29
Hayama	葉山町	Kanagawa	Miura	17.04
Samukawa	寒川町	Kanagawa	Kōza	13.34
Ōiso	大磯町	Kanagawa	Naka	17.18
Ninomiya	二宮町	Kanagawa	Naka	9.08
Nakai	中井町	Kanagawa	Ashigarakami	19.99
Ōi	大井町	Kanagawa	Ashigarakami	14.38
Matsuda	松田町	Kanagawa	Ashigarakami	37.75
Yamakita	山北町	Kanagawa	Ashigarakami	224.61
Kaisei	開成町	Kanagawa	Ashigarakami	6.55
Hakone	箱根町	Kanagawa	Ashigarashimo	92.86
Manazuru	真鶴町	Kanagawa	Ashigarashimo	7.04
Yugawara	湯河原町	Kanagawa	Ashigarashimo	40.97
Seirō	聖籠町	Niigata	Kitakanbara	37.58
Tagami	田上町	Niigata	Minamikanbara	31.71
Aga	阿賀町	Niigata	Higashikanbara	952.89
Izumozaki	出雲崎町	Niigata	Santō	44.38
Yuzawa	湯沢町	Niigata	Minamiuonuma	357.29
Tsunan	津南町	Niigata	Nakauonuma	170.21
Kamiichi	上市町	Toyama	Nakaniikawa	236.71
Tateyama	立山町	Toyama	Nakaniikawa	307.29
Nyūzen	入善町	Toyama	Shimoniikawa	71.25
Asahi	朝日町	Toyama	Shimoniikawa	226.30
Kawakita	川北町	Ishikawa	Nomi	14.64
Tsubata	津幡町	Ishikawa	Kahoku	110.59
Uchinada	内灘町	Ishikawa	Kahoku	20.33
Shika	志賀町	Ishikawa	Hakui	246.76
Hōdatsushimizu	宝達志水町	Ishikawa	Hakui	111.52
Nakanoto	中能登町	Ishikawa	Kashima	89.45
Anamizu	穴水町	Ishikawa	Hōsu	183.21
Noto	能登町	Ishikawa	Hōsu	273.27
Eiheiji	永平寺町	Fukui	Yoshida	94.43
Ikeda	池田町	Fukui	Imadate	194.65
Minamiechizen	南越前町	Fukui	Nanjō	343.69
Echizen	越前町	Fukui	Nyū	153.15
Mihama	美浜町	Fukui	Mikata	152.34
Takahama	高浜町	Fukui	Ōi	72.40
Ōi	おおい町	Fukui	Ōi	212.19
Wakasa	若狭町	Fukui	Mikatakaminaka	178.49
Ichikawamisato	市川三郷町	Yamanashi	Nishiyatsushiro	75.18
Hayakawa	早川町	Yamanashi	Minamikoma	369.96
Minobu	身延町	Yamanashi	Minamikoma	301.98
Nanbu	南部町	Yamanashi	Minamikoma	200.87
Fujikawa	富士川町	Yamanashi	Minamikoma	112.00
Shōwa	昭和町	Yamanashi	Nakakoma	9.08
Nishikatsura	西桂町	Yamanashi	Minamitsuru	15.22
Fujikawaguchiko	富士河口湖町	Yamanashi	Minamitsuru	158.40
Koumi	小海町	Nagano	Minamisaku	114.20
Sakuho	佐久穂町	Nagano	Minamisaku	188.15
Karuizawa	軽井沢町	Nagano	Kitasaku	156.03
Miyota	御代田町	Nagano	Kitasaku	58.79
Tateshina	立科町	Nagano	Kitasaku	66.87
Nagawa	長和町	Nagano	Chiisagata	183.86
Shimosuwa	下諏訪町	Nagano	Suwa	66.87
Fujimi	富士見町	Nagano	Suwa	144.76
Tatsuno	辰野町	Nagano	Kamiina	169.20
Minowa	箕輪町	Nagano	Kamiina	85.91
Iijima	飯島町	Nagano	Kamiina	86.96
Matsukawa	松川町	Nagano	Shimoina	72.79
Takamori	高森町	Nagano	Shimoina	45.36
Anan	阿南町	Nagano	Shimoina	123.07
Agematsu	上松町	Nagano	Kiso	168.42
Nagiso	南木曽町	Nagano	Kiso	215.93
Kiso	木曽町	Nagano	Kiso	476.03
Ikeda	池田町	Nagano	Kitaazumi	40.16
Sakaki	坂城町	Nagano	Hanishina	53.64
Obuse	小布施町	Nagano	Kamitakai	19.12
Yamanouchi	山ノ内町	Nagano	Shimotakai	265.90
Shinano	信濃町	Nagano	Kamiminochi	149.30
Iizuna	飯綱町	Nagano	Kamiminochi	75.00
Ginan	岐南町	Gifu	Hashima	7.91
Kasamatsu	笠松町	Gifu	Hashima	10.30
Yōrō	養老町	Gifu	Yōrō	72.29
Tarui	垂井町	Gifu	Fuwa	57.09
Sekigahara	関ケ原町	Gifu	Fuwa	49.28
Gōdo	神戸町	Gifu	Anpachi	18.78
Wanouchi	輪之内町	Gifu	Anpachi	22.33
Anpachi	安八町	Gifu	Anpachi	18.16
Ibigawa	揖斐川町	Gifu	Ibi	803.44
Ōno	大野町	Gifu	Ibi	34.20
Ikeda	池田町	Gifu	Ibi	38.80
Kitagata	北方町	Gifu	Motosu	5.18
Sakahogi	坂祝町	Gifu	Kamo	12.87
Tomika	富加町	Gifu	Kamo	16.82
Kawabe	川辺町	Gifu	Kamo	41.16
Hichisō	七宗町	Gifu	Kamo	90.47
Yaotsu	八百津町	Gifu	Kamo	128.79
Shirakawa	白川町	Gifu	Kamo	237.90
Mitake	御嵩町	Gifu	Kani	56.69
Higashiizu	東伊豆町	Shizuoka	Kamo	77.86
Kawazu	河津町	Shizuoka	Kamo	100.74
Minamiizu	南伊豆町	Shizuoka	Kamo	110.49
Matsuzaki	松崎町	Shizuoka	Kamo	85.21
Nishiizu	西伊豆町	Shizuoka	Kamo	105.54
Kannami	函南町	Shizuoka	Tagata	65.16
Shimizu	清水町	Shizuoka	Suntō	8.81
Nagaizumi	長泉町	Shizuoka	Suntō	26.63
Oyama	小山町	Shizuoka	Suntō	135.74
Yoshida	吉田町	Shizuoka	Haibara	20.73
Kawanehon	川根本町	Shizuoka	Haibara	496.88
Mori	森町	Shizuoka	Shūchi	133.91
Tōgō	東郷町	Aichi	Aichi	18.03
Toyoyama	豊山町	Aichi	Nishikasugai	6.18
Ōguchi	大口町	Aichi	Niwa	13.61
Fusō	扶桑町	Aichi	Niwa	11.19
Ōharu	大治町	Aichi	Ama	6.59
Kanie	蟹江町	Aichi	Ama	11.09
Agui	阿久比町	Aichi	Chita	23.80
Higashiura	東浦町	Aichi	Chita	31.14
Minamichita	南知多町	Aichi	Chita	38.37
Mihama	美浜町	Aichi	Chita	46.20
Taketoyo	武豊町	Aichi	Chita	25.92
Kōta	幸田町	Aichi	Nukata	56.72
Shitara	設楽町	Aichi	Kitashitara	273.94
Tōei	東栄町	Aichi	Kitashitara	123.38
Kisosaki	木曽岬町	Mie	Kuwana	15.74
Tōin	東員町	Mie	Inabe	22.68
Komono	菰野町	Mie	Mie	107.01
Asahi	朝日町	Mie	Mie	5.99
Kawagoe	川越町	Mie	Mie	8.73
Taki	多気町	Mie	Taki	103.06
Meiwa	明和町	Mie	Taki	41.04
Ōdai	大台町	Mie	Taki	362.86
Tamaki	玉城町	Mie	Watarai	40.91
Watarai	度会町	Mie	Watarai	134.98
Taiki	大紀町	Mie	Watarai	233.32
Minamiise	南伊勢町	Mie	Watarai	241.89
Kihoku	紀北町	Mie	Kitamuro	256.53
Mihama	御浜町	Mie	Minamimuro	88.13
Kihō	紀宝町	Mie	Minamimuro	79.62
Hino	日野町	Shiga	Gamō	117.60
Ryūō	竜王町	Shiga	Gamō	44.55
Aishō	愛荘町	Shiga	Echi	37.97
Toyosato	豊郷町	Shiga	Inukami	7.80
Kōra	甲良町	Shiga	Inukami	13.63
Taga	多賀町	Shiga	Inukami	135.77
Ōyamazaki	大山崎町	Kyoto	Otokuni	5.97
Kumiyama	久御山町	Kyoto	Kuse	13.86
Ide	井手町	Kyoto	Tsuzuki	18.04
Ujitawara	宇治田原町	Kyoto	Tsuzuki	58.16
Kasagi	笠置町	Kyoto	Sōraku	23.52
Wazuka	和束町	Kyoto	Sōraku	64.93
Seika	精華町	Kyoto	Sōraku	25.68
Kyōtamba	京丹波町	Kyoto	Funai	303.09
Ine	伊根町	Kyoto	Yosa	61.95
Yosano	与謝野町	Kyoto	Yosa	108.38
Shimamoto	島本町	Osaka	Mishima	16.81
Toyono	豊能町	Osaka	Toyono	34.34
Nose	能勢町	Osaka	Toyono	98.75
Tadaoka	忠岡町	Osaka	Senboku	3.97
Kumatori	熊取町	Osaka	Sennan	17.24
Tajiri	田尻町	Osaka	Sennan	5.62
Misaki	岬町	Osaka	Sennan	49.18
Taishi	太子町	Osaka	Minamikawachi	14.17
Kanan	河南町	Osaka	Minamikawachi	25.26
Inagawa	猪名川町	Hyōgo	Kawabe	90.33
Taka	多可町	Hyōgo	Taka	185.19
Inami	稲美町	Hyōgo	Kako	34.92
Harima	播磨町	Hyōgo	Kako	9.13
Ichikawa	市川町	Hyōgo	Kanzaki	82.67
Fukusaki	福崎町	Hyōgo	Kanzaki	45.79
Kamikawa	神河町	Hyōgo	Kanzaki	202.23
Taishi	太子町	Hyōgo	Ibo	22.61
Kamigōri	上郡町	Hyōgo	Akō	150.26
Sayō	佐用町	Hyōgo	Sayō	307.44
Kami	香美町	Hyōgo	Mikata	368.77
Shin'onsen	新温泉町	Hyōgo	Mikata	241.01
Heguri	平群町	Nara	Ikoma	23.90
Sangō	三郷町	Nara	Ikoma	8.79
Ikaruga	斑鳩町	Nara	Ikoma	14.27
Ando	安堵町	Nara	Ikoma	4.31
Kawanishi	川西町	Nara	Shiki	5.93
Miyake	三宅町	Nara	Shiki	4.06
Tawaramoto	田原本町	Nara	Shiki	21.09
Takatori	高取町	Nara	Takaichi	25.79
Kanmaki	上牧町	Nara	Kitakatsuragi	6.14
Ōji	王寺町	Nara	Kitakatsuragi	7.01
Kōryō	広陵町	Nara	Kitakatsuragi	16.30
Kawai	河合町	Nara	Kitakatsuragi	8.23
Yoshino	吉野町	Nara	Yoshino	95.65
Ōyodo	大淀町	Nara	Yoshino	38.10
Shimoichi	下市町	Nara	Yoshino	61.99
Kushimoto	串本町	Wakayama	Higashimuro	135.78
Kimino	紀美野町	Wakayama	Kaisō	128.34
Katsuragi	かつらぎ町	Wakayama	Ito	151.69
Kudoyama	九度山町	Wakayama	Ito	44.15
Kōya	高野町	Wakayama	Ito	137.03
Yuasa	湯浅町	Wakayama	Arida	20.79
Hirogawa	広川町	Wakayama	Arida	65.33
Aridagawa	有田川町	Wakayama	Arida	351.84
Mihama	美浜町	Wakayama	Hidaka	12.77
Hidaka	日高町	Wakayama	Hidaka	46.19
Yura	由良町	Wakayama	Hidaka	30.94
Inami	印南町	Wakayama	Hidaka	113.62
Minabe	みなべ町	Wakayama	Hidaka	120.28
Hidakagawa	日高川町	Wakayama	Hidaka	331.59
Shirahama	白浜町	Wakayama	Nishimuro	200.96
Kamitonda	上富田町	Wakayama	Nishimuro	57.37
Susami	すさみ町	Wakayama	Nishimuro	174.46
Nachikatsuura	那智勝浦町	Wakayama	Higashimuro	183.31
Taiji	太地町	Wakayama	Higashimuro	5.81
Kozagawa	古座川町	Wakayama	Higashimuro	294.23
Iwami	岩美町	Tottori	Iwami	122.32
Wakasa	若桜町	Tottori	Yazu	199.18
Chizu	智頭町	Tottori	Yazu	224.70
Yazu	八頭町	Tottori	Yazu	206.71
Misasa	三朝町	Tottori	Tōhaku	233.52
Yurihama	湯梨浜町	Tottori	Tōhaku	77.94
Kotoura	琴浦町	Tottori	Tōhaku	139.97
Hokuei	北栄町	Tottori	Tōhaku	56.94
Daisen	大山町	Tottori	Saihaku	189.83
Nanbu	南部町	Tottori	Saihaku	114.03
Hōki	伯耆町	Tottori	Saihaku	139.44
Nichinan	日南町	Tottori	Hino	340.96
Hino	日野町	Tottori	Hino	133.98
Kōfu	江府町	Tottori	Hino	124.52
Okuizumo	奥出雲町	Shimane	Nita	368.01
Iinan	飯南町	Shimane	Iishi	242.88
Kawamoto	川本町	Shimane	Ōchi	106.43
Misato	美郷町	Shimane	Ōchi	282.92
Ōnan	邑南町	Shimane	Ōchi	419.29
Tsuwano	津和野町	Shimane	Kanoashi	307.03
Yoshika	吉賀町	Shimane	Kanoashi	336.50
Ama	海士町	Shimane	Oki	33.43
Nishinoshima	西ノ島町	Shimane	Oki	55.95
Okinoshima	隠岐の島町	Shimane	Oki	242.83
Wake	和気町	Okayama	Wake	144.21
Hayashima	早島町	Okayama	Tsukubo	7.62
Satoshō	里庄町	Okayama	Asakuchi	12.23
Yakage	矢掛町	Okayama	Oda	90.62
Kagamino	鏡野町	Okayama	Tomata	419.68
Shōō	勝央町	Okayama	Katsuta	54.05
Nagi	奈義町	Okayama	Katsuta	69.52
Kumenan	久米南町	Okayama	Kume	78.65
Misaki	美咲町	Okayama	Kume	232.17
Kibichūō	吉備中央町	Okayama	Kaga	268.78
Fuchū	府中町	Hiroshima	Aki	10.41
Kaita	海田町	Hiroshima	Aki	13.79
Kumano	熊野町	Hiroshima	Aki	33.76
Saka	坂町	Hiroshima	Aki	15.69
Kitahiroshima	北広島町	Hiroshima	Yamagata	646.20
Akiōta	安芸太田町	Hiroshima	Yamagata	341.89
Ōsakikamijima	大崎上島町	Hiroshima	Toyota	43.11
Sera	世羅町	Hiroshima	Sera	278.14
Jinsekikōgen	神石高原町	Hiroshima	Jinseki	381.98
Suō-Ōshima	周防大島町	Yamaguchi	Ōshima	138.09
Waki	和木町	Yamaguchi	Kuga	10.58
Kaminoseki	上関町	Yamaguchi	Kumage	34.69
Tabuse	田布施町	Yamaguchi	Kumage	50.42
Hirao	平生町	Yamaguchi	Kumage	34.58
Abu	阿武町	Yamaguchi	Abu	115.95
Katsuura	勝浦町	Tokushima	Katsuura	69.83
Kamikatsu	上勝町	Tokushima	Katsuura	109.63
Ishii	石井町	Tokushima	Myōzai	28.85
Kamiyama	神山町	Tokushima	Myōzai	173.30
Naka	那賀町	Tokushima	Naka	694.98
Mugi	牟岐町	Tokushima	Kaifu	56.56
Minami	美波町	Tokushima	Kaifu	140.82
Kaiyō	海陽町	Tokushima	Kaifu	327.65
Matsushige	松茂町	Tokushima	Itano	14.24
Kitajima	北島町	Tokushima	Itano	8.74
Aizumi	藍住町	Tokushima	Itano	16.27
Itano	板野町	Tokushima	Itano	36.22
Kamiita	上板町	Tokushima	Itano	34.58
Tsurugi	つるぎ町	Tokushima	Mima	194.84
Higashimiyoshi	東みよし町	Tokushima	Miyoshi	122.48
Tonoshō	土庄町	Kagawa	Shōzu	74.37
Shōdoshima	小豆島町	Kagawa	Shōzu	95.59
Miki	三木町	Kagawa	Kita	75.78
Naoshima	直島町	Kagawa	Kagawa	14.22
Utazu	宇多津町	Kagawa	Ayauta	8.10
Ayagawa	綾川町	Kagawa	Ayauta	109.75
Kotohira	琴平町	Kagawa	Nakatado	8.47
Tadotsu	多度津町	Kagawa	Nakatado	24.38
Mannō	まんのう町	Kagawa	Nakatado	194.45
Kamijima	上島町	Ehime	Ochi	30.38
Kumakōgen	久万高原町	Ehime	Kamiukena	583.69
Masaki	松前町	Ehime	Iyo	20.41
Tobe	砥部町	Ehime	Iyo	101.59
Uchiko	内子町	Ehime	Kita	299.43
Ikata	伊方町	Ehime	Nishiuwa	93.98
Kihoku	鬼北町	Ehime	Kitauwa	241.88
Matsuno	松野町	Ehime	Kitauwa	98.45
Ainan	愛南町	Ehime	Minamiuwa	238.98
Tōyō	東洋町	Kōchi	Aki	74.06
Nahari	奈半利町	Kōchi	Aki	28.36
Tano	田野町	Kōchi	Aki	6.53
Yasuda	安田町	Kōchi	Aki	52.36
Motoyama	本山町	Kōchi	Nagaoka	134.22
Ōtoyo	大豊町	Kōchi	Nagaoka	315.06
Tosa	土佐町	Kōchi	Tosa	212.13
Ino	いの町	Kōchi	Agawa	470.97
Niyodogawa	仁淀川町	Kōchi	Agawa	333.00
Nakatosa	中土佐町	Kōchi	Takaoka	193.28
Sakawa	佐川町	Kōchi	Takaoka	100.80
Ochi	越知町	Kōchi	Takaoka	111.95
Yusuhara	梼原町	Kōchi	Takaoka	236.45
Tsuno	津野町	Kōchi	Takaoka	197.85
Shimanto	四万十町	Kōchi	Takaoka	642.30
Ōtsuki	大月町	Kōchi	Hata	102.94
Kuroshio	黒潮町	Kōchi	Hata	188.58
Umi	宇美町	Fukuoka	Kasuya	30.21
Sasaguri	篠栗町	Fukuoka	Kasuya	38.93
Shime	志免町	Fukuoka	Kasuya	8.69
Sue	須恵町	Fukuoka	Kasuya	16.31
Shingū	新宮町	Fukuoka	Kasuya	18.93
Hisayama	久山町	Fukuoka	Kasuya	37.44
Kasuya	粕屋町	Fukuoka	Kasuya	14.13
Ashiya	芦屋町	Fukuoka	Onga	11.60
Mizumaki	水巻町	Fukuoka	Onga	11.01
Okagaki	岡垣町	Fukuoka	Onga	48.64
Onga	遠賀町	Fukuoka	Onga	22.15
Kotake	小竹町	Fukuoka	Kurate	14.18
Kurate	鞍手町	Fukuoka	Kurate	35.60
Keisen	桂川町	Fukuoka	Kaho	20.14
Chikuzen	筑前町	Fukuoka	Asakura	67.10
Tachiarai	大刀洗町	Fukuoka	Mii	22.84
Ōki	大木町	Fukuoka	Mizuma	18.44
Hirokawa	広川町	Fukuoka	Yame	37.94
Kawara	香春町	Fukuoka	Tagawa	44.50
Soeda	添田町	Fukuoka	Tagawa	132.20
Itoda	糸田町	Fukuoka	Tagawa	8.04
Kawasaki	川崎町	Fukuoka	Tagawa	36.14
Ōtō	大任町	Fukuoka	Tagawa	14.26
Fukuchi	福智町	Fukuoka	Tagawa	42.06
Kanda	苅田町	Fukuoka	Miyako	48.88
Miyako	みやこ町	Fukuoka	Miyako	151.34
Yoshitomi	吉富町	Fukuoka	Chikujō	5.73
Kōge	上毛町	Fukuoka	Chikujō	62.44
Chikujō	築上町	Fukuoka	Chikujō	119.61
Yoshinogari	吉野ヶ里町	Saga	Kanzaki	43.99
Kiyama	基山町	Saga	Miyaki	22.15
Kamimine	上峰町	Saga	Miyaki	12.80
Miyaki	みやき町	Saga	Miyaki	51.92
Genkai	玄海町	Saga	Higashimatsuura	35.90
Arita	有田町	Saga	Nishimatsuura	65.85
Ōmachi	大町町	Saga	Kishima	11.50
Kōhoku	江北町	Saga	Kishima	24.49
Shiroishi	白石町	Saga	Kishima	99.56
Tara	太良町	Saga	Fujitsu	74.30
Nagayo	長与町	Nagasaki	Nishisonogi	28.73
Togitsu	時津町	Nagasaki	Nishisonogi	20.94
Higashisonogi	東彼杵町	Nagasaki	Higashisonogi	74.29
Kawatana	川棚町	Nagasaki	Higashisonogi	37.34
Hasami	波佐見町	Nagasaki	Higashisonogi	56.00
Ojika	小値賀町	Nagasaki	Kitamatsuura	25.53
Saza	佐々町	Nagasaki	Kitamatsuura	32.27
Shin-Kamigotō	新上五島町	Nagasaki	Minamimatsuura	213.94
Misato	美里町	Kumamoto	Shimomashiki	144.00
Gyokutō	玉東町	Kumamoto	Tamana	24.33
Nankan	南関町	Kumamoto	Tamana	68.92
Nagasu	長洲町	Kumamoto	Tamana	19.43
Nagomi	和水町	Kumamoto	Tamana	98.78
Ōzu	大津町	Kumamoto	Kikuchi	99.10
Kikuyō	菊陽町	Kumamoto	Kikuchi	37.46
Minamioguni	南小国町	Kumamoto	Aso	115.90
Oguni	小国町	Kumamoto	Aso	136.94
Takamori	高森町	Kumamoto	Aso	174.90
Mifune	御船町	Kumamoto	Kamimashiki	99.03
Kashima	嘉島町	Kumamoto	Kamimashiki	16.65
Mashiki	益城町	Kumamoto	Kamimashiki	65.68
Kōsa	甲佐町	Kumamoto	Kamimashiki	57.93
Yamato	山都町	Kumamoto	Kamimashiki	544.67
Hikawa	氷川町	Kumamoto	Yatsushiro	33.36
Ashikita	芦北町	Kumamoto	Ashikita	233.97
Tsunagi	津奈木町	Kumamoto	Ashikita	34.09
Nishiki	錦町	Kumamoto	Kuma	85.04
Taragi	多良木町	Kumamoto	Kuma	165.86
Yunomae	湯前町	Kumamoto	Kuma	48.37
Asagiri	あさぎり町	Kumamoto	Kuma	159.56
Reihoku	苓北町	Kumamoto	Amakusa	67.55
Hiji	日出町	Ōita	Hayami	73.33
Kusu	玖珠町	Ōita	Kusu	286.51
Kokonoe	九重町	Ōita	Kusu	271.37
Mimata	三股町	Miyazaki	Kitamorokata	110.02
Takaharu	高原町	Miyazaki	Nishimorokata	85.39
Kunitomi	国富町	Miyazaki	Higashimorokata	130.63
Aya	綾町	Miyazaki	Higashimorokata	95.19
Takanabe	高鍋町	Miyazaki	Koyu	43.80
Shintomi	新富町	Miyazaki	Koyu	61.53
Kijō	木城町	Miyazaki	Koyu	145.96
Kawaminami	川南町	Miyazaki	Koyu	90.12
Tsuno	都農町	Miyazaki	Koyu	102.11
Kadogawa	門川町	Miyazaki	Higashiusuki	120.51
Misato	美郷町	Miyazaki	Higashiusuki	448.84
Takachiho	高千穂町	Miyazaki	Nishiusuki	237.54
Hinokage	日之影町	Miyazaki	Nishiusuki	277.67
Gokase	五ヶ瀬町	Miyazaki	Nishiusuki	171.73
Satsuma	さつま町	Kagoshima	Satsuma	303.90
Nagashima	長島町	Kagoshima	Izumi	116.12
Yūsui	湧水町	Kagoshima	Aira	144.29
Ōsaki	大崎町	Kagoshima	Soo	100.67
Higashikushira	東串良町	Kagoshima	Kimotsuki	27.78
Kinkō	錦江町	Kagoshima	Kimotsuki	163.19
Minamiōsumi	南大隅町	Kagoshima	Kimotsuki	213.54
Kimotsuki	肝付町	Kagoshima	Kimotsuki	308.10
Nakatane	中種子町	Kagoshima	Kumage	137.82
Minamitane	南種子町	Kagoshima	Kumage	110.36
Yakushima	屋久島町	Kagoshima	Kumage	540.48
Setouchi	瀬戸内町	Kagoshima	Ōshima	239.63
Tatsugō	龍郷町	Kagoshima	Ōshima	82.01
Kikai	喜界町	Kagoshima	Ōshima	56.97
Tokunoshima	徳之島町	Kagoshima	Ōshima	104.92
Amagi	天城町	Kagoshima	Ōshima	80.40
Isen	伊仙町	Kagoshima	Ōshima	62.71
Wadomari	和泊町	Kagoshima	Ōshima	40.39
China	知名町	Kagoshima	Ōshima	53.30
Yoron	与論町	Kagoshima	Ōshima	20.58
Motobu	本部町	Okinawa	Kunigami	54.33
Kin	金武町	Okinawa	Kunigami	37.84
Kadena	嘉手納町	Okinawa	Nakagami	15.12
Chatan	北谷町	Okinawa	Nakagami	13.93
Nishihara	西原町	Okinawa	Nakagami	15.90
Yonabaru	与那原町	Okinawa	Shimajiri	5.18
Haebaru	南風原町	Okinawa	Shimajiri	10.76
Kumejima	久米島町	Okinawa	Shimajiri	63.65
Yaese	八重瀬町	Okinawa	Shimajiri	26.96
Taketomi	竹富町	Okinawa	Yaeyama	334.39
Yonaguni	与那国町	Okinawa	Yaeyama	28.96

== See also ==
- Municipalities of Japan
- List of villages in Japan
- List of cities in Japan
- Japanese addressing system
