= Banshū =

Banshū or Banshu may refer to:

- Banshū (磐州)
  - Banshū, another name for Iwaki Province.
- Banshū (播州)
  - Banshū, another name for Harima Province.
