= Nagare temple ruins =

- 流廃寺跡
- Location within Fukushima Prefecture Location within Japan

Religion
- Affiliation: Buddhist
- Status: ruins

Location
- Location: Tanagura, Fukushima
- Country: Japan
- Interactive map of Nagare temple ruins
- Coordinates: 37°01′48″N 140°22′47″E

Nagare temple ruins (流廃寺跡, Nagare haji ato) is an archaeological site with the ruins of a Heian period Buddhist temple located in what is now the town of Tanagura, Fukushima, in the southern Tōhoku region of Japan. The temple no longer exists, but the temple grounds were designated as a National Historic Site by the Japanese government in 2014.

== Overview ==
The site is located on a series of 13 artificially flattened areas extending along a single ridgeline, on a hill in Tanagura. Per excavations undertaken by the Tanagura Board of Education for ten years, starting in 2003, the foundations of nine buildings were discovered, including that of one large building, believed to be the site of the Main Hall, along with passages and stairs connecting each artificial plateau. The name of the temple is unknown, and it does not appear in any written documentation.

The ruins date from the late 9th century to early 10th century, when it appears to have been destroyed by a fire. One artifact found at the sire was a ceremonial iron sword with an inlay of gold and silver, with a decoration of flames and Siddhaṃ script letters. Such a sword is typically associated with Fudō Myō-ō, indicating that the temple may have belonged to the Shingon or similar esoteric sect of Buddhism. The site is considered important in understanding the spread of Buddhism into the Tōhoku region during the Heian period.

== See also ==
- List of Historic Sites of Japan (Fukushima)
