= Higashishirakawa District =

District in Fukushima prefecture, Japan

Higashishirakawa District 東白川郡
- District
- Location of Higashishirakawa District (yellow) in Fukushima Prefecture
- Coordinates: 37°02′N 140°23′E
- Country: Japan
- Region: Tōhoku region
- Prefecture: Fukushima Prefecture
- Municipalities: 3 towns, 1 village: Hanawa, Samegawa, Tanagura, Yamatsuri

Area
  - Total: 620.95 km^{2} (239.75 sq mi)

Population (2020)
  - Total: 30,086
  - Density: 48.452/km^{2} (125.49/sq mi)
- Time zone: UTC+9 (JST)
- Historical province: Mutsu Province (until 1868); Iwaki Province (1868–1871)
- Circuit: Tōsandō

Higashishirakawa (東白川郡, Higashishirakawa-gun) is a district located in Fukushima Prefecture, Japan.

As of April 2025, the district has an estimated population of 28,339. The total area is 620.94 km^{2}.

== Towns and villages ==
- Hanawa
- Tanagura
- Yamatsuri
- Samegawa

== Sources ==
- Kadokawa Nihon Chimei Daijiten Hensan Iinkai, ed. (1981-03-01). Kadokawa Nihon Chimei Daijiten 角川日本地名大辞典 [Kadokawa Japanese Place Name Dictionary] (in Japanese). Vol. 7 (Fukushima-ken). Kadokawa Shoten. ISBN 4-04-001070-1.
- "Kyūdaka Kyūryō Torishirabechō Database" 旧高旧領取調帳データベース [Database of Former Yields [tax values] and Former Domains] (in Japanese). National Museum of Japanese History.
- "Reiwa 2-nen Kokusei Chōsa Jinkō-tō Kihon Shūkei Kekka" 令和2年国勢調査 人口等基本集計結果 [2020 Census: Basic Findings on Population and Households] (PDF) (in Japanese). Fukushima Prefecture. 2020.
