= Ishikawa District, Fukushima =

District in Fukushima prefecture, Japan

Coordinates: 37.132°N 140.556°E

- List of Provinces of Japan > Tōsandō > Iwaki Province > Ishikawa District
- Japan > Tōhoku region > Fukushima Prefecture > Ishikawa District

Location of Ishikawa District in Fukushima Prefecture

Ishikawa (石川郡, Ishikawa-gun) is a district located in Fukushima Prefecture, Japan.

As of 2020, the district has an estimated population of 37,723 and a density of 82.63 persons per km^{2}. The total area is 456.70 km^{2}.

== Towns and villages ==
- Asakawa
- Furudono
- Ishikawa
- Hirata
- Tamakawa
