= Watari District, Miyagi =

Japanese district

Coordinates: 38.000°N 140.882°E

Watari (亘理郡, Watari-gun) is a district located in Miyagi Prefecture, Japan.

As of 2003, the district has an estimated population of 53,076 and a population density of 385.47 persons per km^{2}. The total area is 137.69 km^{2}.

== Towns and villages ==
- Watari
- Yamamoto

== Merger ==
The towns of Watari and Yamamoto were planning to merge and create a new city under the name of Watari. Watari District would dissolve if the city should be created. However, nothing has yet to occur.
