= Iwaki Province (1868) =

Former province of Japan

Map of the former Japanese provinces with Iwaki highlighted

Iwaki (磐城国, Iwaki no Kuni; Japanese pronunciation: [í.β̞ä̀.kì (nò̞ kɯ̈̀ ɲ̟ì)]) was an old province in the area that is today Fukushima Prefecture. It was sometimes called Banshū (磐州).

== History ==
- This iteration of Iwaki Province was established during the Meiji Era. It was cut out of Mutsu Province and corresponded to the eastern part of what is now modern Fukushima Prefecture on December 17 of 1868 of Japanese calendar, which is January 19, 1869 of Gregorian calendar. Its population in 1872 was 348,608.

== Historical districts ==
Iwaki Province consisted of fourteen districts:

- Miyagi Prefecture
  - Igu District (伊具郡)
  - Katta District (刈田郡)
  - Watari District (亘理郡)
- Fukushima Prefecture
  - Nakadōri Region, Fukushima
    - Ishikawa District (石川郡)
    - Shirakawa District (白川郡, a.k.a. Higashishirakawa or East Shirakawa)
    - Shirakawa District (白河郡, a.k.a. Nishishirakwa or West Shirakawa)
    - Tamura District (田村郡)
  - Hamadōri Region, Fukushima
    - Iwaki District (磐城郡) - absorbed Iwasaki and Kikuta Districts to become a new and expanded Iwaki District (石城郡) on April 1, 1896
    - Iwasaki District (磐前郡) - merged into Iwaki District (along with Kikuta District) on April 1, 1896
    - Kikuta District (菊多郡) - merged into Iwaki District (along with Iwasaki District) on April 1, 1896
    - Namekata District (行方郡) - merged with Uda District to become Sōma District on April 1, 1896
    - Naraha District (楢葉郡) - merged with Shineha District to become Futaba District on April 1, 1896
    - Shineha District (標葉郡) - merged with Naraha District to become Futaba District on April 1, 1896
    - Uda District (宇多郡) - merged with Namekata District to become Sōma District on April 1, 1896

== See also ==
- Sanriku
- Iwaki Province (718), early forerunner.

== Other websites ==
Media related to Iwaki Province (1868) at Wikimedia Commons

- Murdoch's map of provinces, 1903
