= Nakadōri =

Region in Fukushima Prefecture, Japan

Coordinates: 37.55°N 140.39°E

Nakadōri 中通り
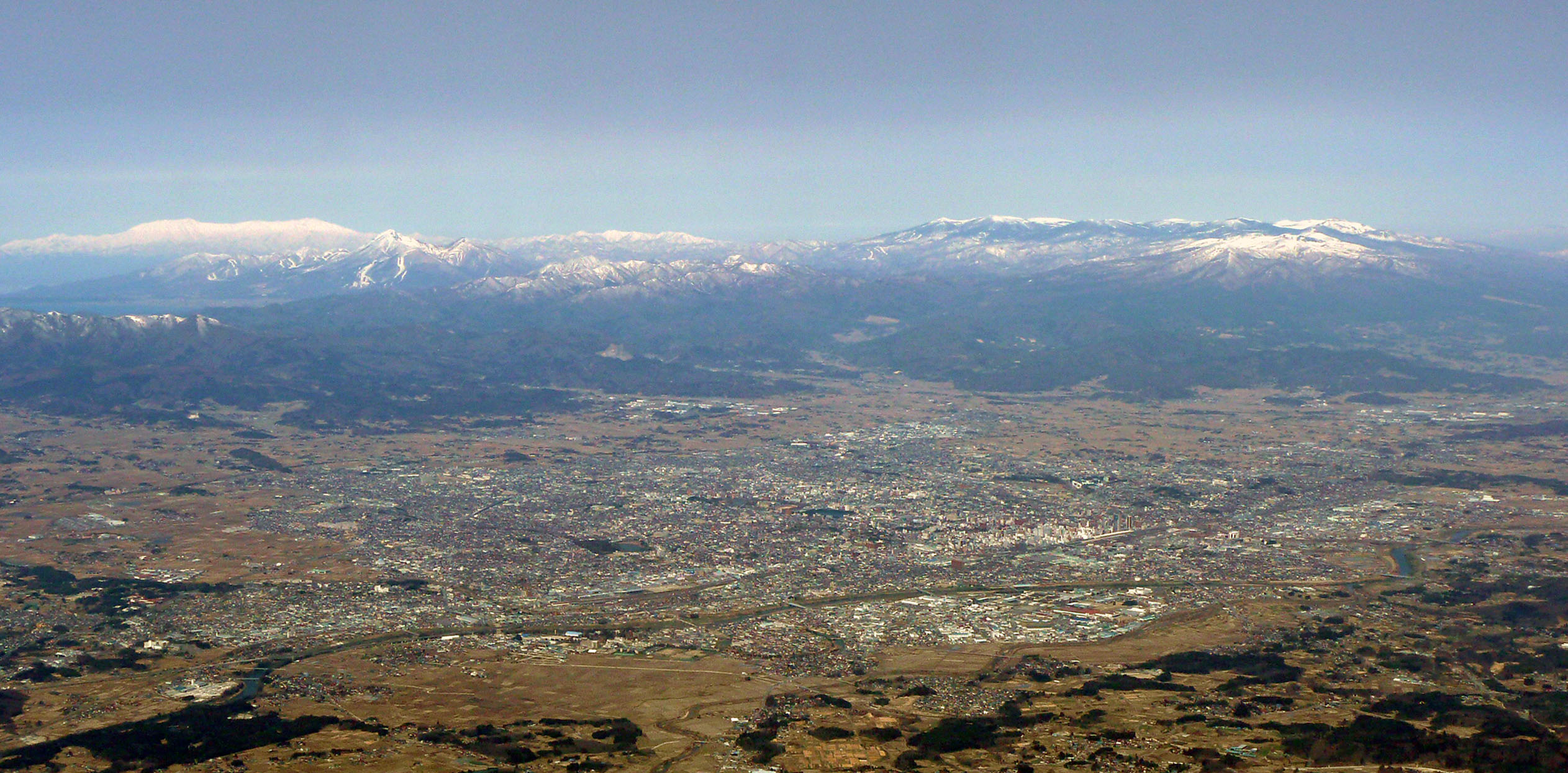
- Kōriyama in front of the Ōu Mountains. The Ōu Mountains form the western border of Nakadōri

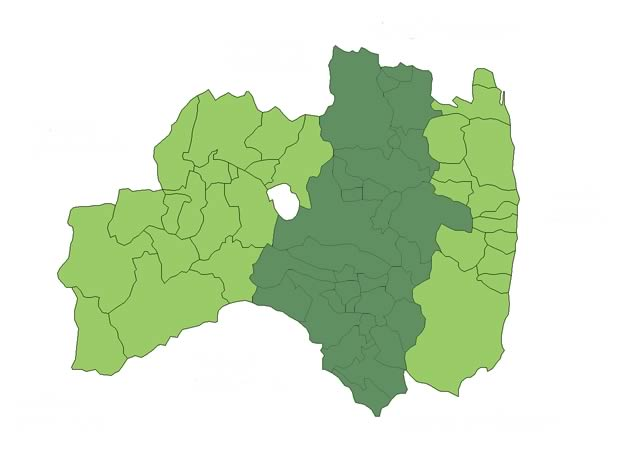
- Nakadōri comprises the approximately the central third of Fukushima Prefecture
- Country: Japan
- Prefecture: Fukushima

Area
  - Total: 5,392.95 km^{2} (2,082.23 sq mi)

Population (1 October 2017)
  - Total: 1,159,245
  - Density: 214.956/km^{2} (556.733/sq mi)

Nakadōri (中通り, Nakadōri) is a region comprising the middle third of Fukushima Prefecture, Japan. It is situated between the regions of Aizu to the west and Hamadōri to the east. The principal cities of the area are Kōriyama and the prefecture's capital, Fukushima.
