= Iwaki-Tanakura Station =

Railway station in Tanagura, Fukushima Prefecture, Japan

Iwaki-Tanakura Station 磐城棚倉駅
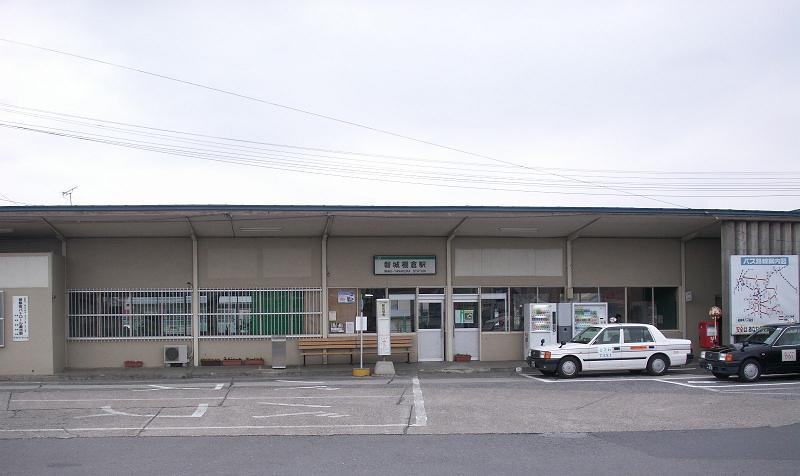
- Iwaki-Tanakura Station in March 2007

General information
- Location: Tanagura Kitamachi 56, Tanagura-machi, Higashishirakawa-gun, Fukushima-ken 963-6131; Japan
- Coordinates: 37.0354°N 140.3845°E
- Operator: JR East
- Line: ■ Suigun Line
- Distance: 90.5 km from Mito
- Platforms: 1 island platform
- Tracks: 2

Other information
- Status: Staffed (Midori no Madoguchi)
- Website: Official website

History
- Opened: November 29, 1916

Passengers
- FY2018: 166 daily

Services
| Preceding station | JR East | Following station |
|---|---|---|
| Nakatoyo towards Mito | Suigun Line | Iwaki-Asakawa towards Kōriyama |
Location
- Location within Fukushima Prefecture Location within Japan

Iwaki-Tanakura Station (磐城棚倉駅, Iwaki-Tanakura-eki) is a railway station in the town of Tanagura, Fukushima, Japan operated by East Japan Railway Company (JR East).

== Lines ==
Iwaki-Tanakura Station is served by the Suigun Line, and is located 90.5 rail kilometers from the official starting point of the line at Mito.

== Station layout ==
The station has one island platform connected to the station building by a footbridge. The station has a Midori no Madoguchi staffed ticket office.

=== Platforms ===
| 1 | ■ Suigun Line | for Iwaki-Ishikawa and Kōriyama |
| 2 | ■ Suigun Line | Mito |

== History ==
Iwaki-Tanakura Station opened on November 29, 1916 as a station on the Hakuho Raukway. The Japan Government Railway's Suigun Line connected to the station on November 11, 1932, and the Hakuho Railway was nationalized on May 1, 1941, and suspension of service as Hakuhō Line on December 11, 1944. The station was absorbed into the JR East network upon the privatization of the Japanese National Railways (JNR) on April 1, 1987.

== Bus routes ==
- JR BUS KANTO Hakuhō Line
  - For Shin-Shirakawa Station via Shirakawa Station
  - For Sobo'oka
- Fukushima Transportation
  - For Higashidate Station via Iwaki-Hanawa Station
  - For Iwaki-Ishikawa Station

== Passenger statistics ==
In fiscal 2018, the station was used by an average of 166 passengers daily (boarding passengers only).

== Surrounding area ==
- Tanagura Town Hall
- Tanagura Post Office
- site of Tanagura Castle
- National Route 118
- National Route 289

== See also ==
- List of railway stations in Japan
