= Hakuhō Line =

JR Bus Kanto route

白棚線

Overview
- Other name: Hakuhō Line
- Status: converted to busway
- Owner: Hakuhō Railway (1914–1941); Japanese Government Railways (1941–1943); Ministry of Transport and Communications (1943–1957)
- Termini: Shirakawa Station; Iwaki-Tanakura Station
- Stations: 11

History
- Opened: 8 October 1916
- withdrawal of service: 11 December 1944

Technical
- Line length: 23.3 km (14.5 mi)
- Track gauge: 1,067 mm (3 ft 6 in)
- Electrification: none

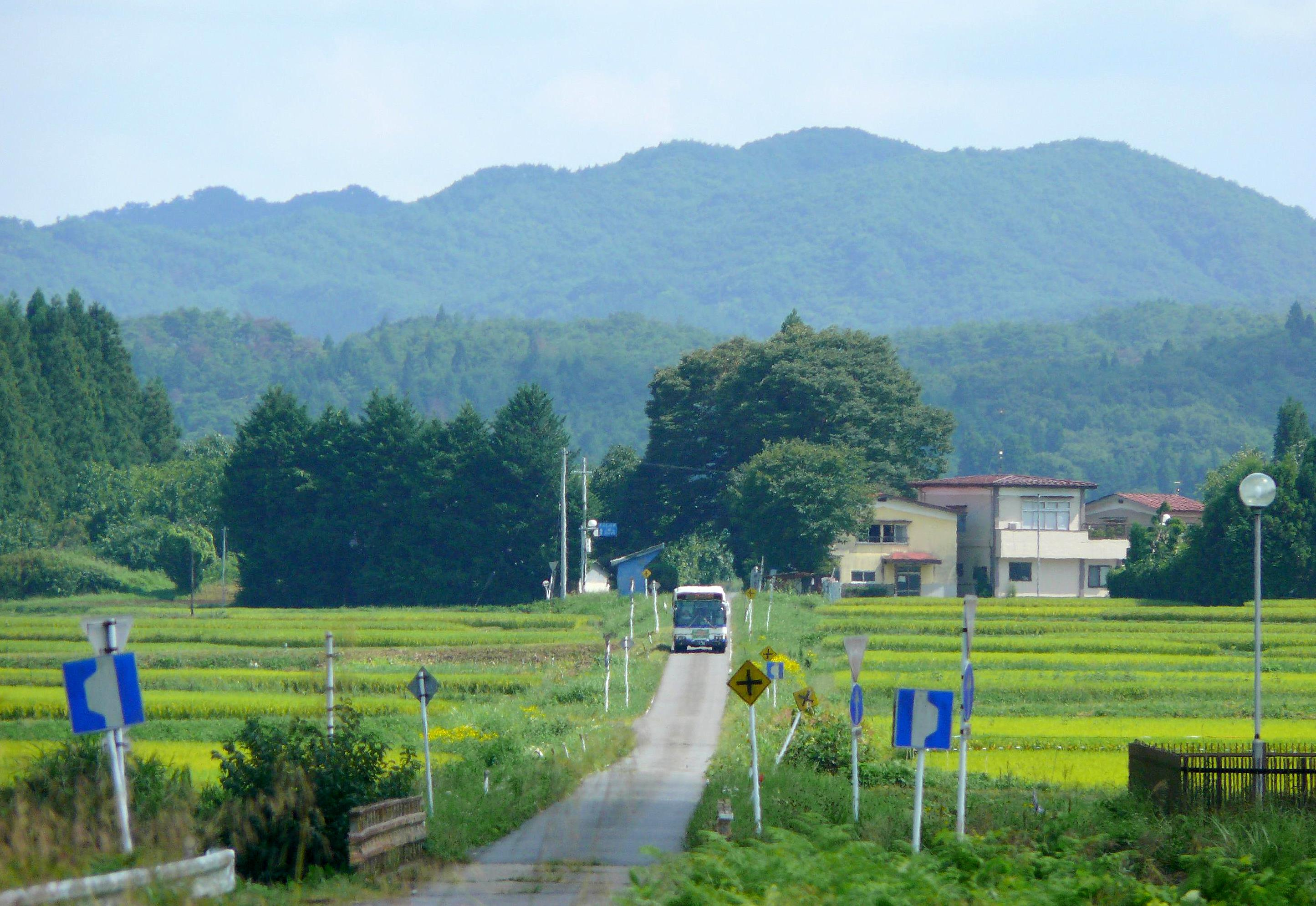
A September 2009 view of the bus-only roadway near Bansawa-Onsenguch

Hakuhō Line (Japanese: 白棚線) is a JR Bus Kanto bus route. It connects Shirakawa Station in Shirakawa, Fukushima, with Iwaki-Tanakura Station, Higashishirakawa District. The route was originally a private railway, taken over by Japanese Government Railways in 1941. It was then transferred to The Ministry of Transport and Communications in 1943. Rail service was suspended in 1944, being replaced by buses. In 1957 the Japan National Railway (JNR) bus department converted the right-of-way to an exclusive bus road. After the JNR break-up in 1987, the bus route was transferred to JR East and JR Bus.

== History ==
=== Construction ===
During the Edo era, there was a Tanakura Domain jōkamachi (castle town) in Higashishirakawa District, Fukushima. By the time of the Meiji era there was a municipal hall, police station, and tax office. Following the opening of the Nippon Railway in 1897, the economy of the district declined. However，many wealthy people tried to revive the town and proposed constructing a railway line to serve the many coal mines in Kaneyama and Takano. However, the plan was abandoned in 1898.

After the plan failed, Keijirō Amenomiya (雨宮敬次郎, Amenomiya Keijirō), known as the "Railway King" (鉄道王, Tetsudō-ō), began building the line as a 762 mm (2 ft 6 in) narrow gauge railway, but the line wasn't completed. After years of deadlock the Tanakura Railway was permitted to construct the railway in 1908. However, three other companies were also authorized in 1912.

In 1914, the Hakuhō Railway started to construct the Hakuhō Line. At the same time the gauge was changed to 1,067 mm (3 ft 6 in) to allow direct connection to the Japan National Railway. The corporate name was also changed from Hakuhō Narrow Gauge Railway (Japanese:白棚軽便鉄道) to Hakuhō Railway (Japanese:白棚鉄道).

=== Nationalization ===
When the Suigun Line was extended to Iwaki-Tanakura Station in 1932, the Hakuhō Railway began losing money because rates for freight were lower on the Japan National Railway. The Hakuhō Railway applied for abandonment, and the JNR tried acquiring it. However, the plan was not approved at the time due to finances. In 1936 the Japan National Railway finally authorized debt to acquire the Hakuhō Railway. Two years later JNR took over the line. As World War II progressed, service was suspended in 1944 when the railway was designated as a nonessential and nonurgent line (Japanese: 不要不急線).

After World War II it was proposed that the railway be rebuilt and operated with Galloping Goose railbuses. Instead, the line was abandoned and converted to bus.

=== Timeline ===
- 23 June 1913 - authorized construction of the Hakuhō Narrow Gauge Railway
- 17 June 1914 - name changed to Hakuhō Railway
- 8 October 1916 - 19.6 kilometres (12.2 miles) of line opened between Shirakawamachi and Kanasawauchi
- 29 November 1916 - remaining 3.7 kilometres (2.3 mi) opened from Kanasawauchi to Iwaki-Tanakura
- 28 April 1917 - Yanamori Station opened
- 19 May 1926 - Sekisanguchi Station opened
- 1 April 1929 - Nobori-machi, Bansawa, and Mimori station opened
- 11 November 1931 - Suigun Line and Iwaki-Tanakura Station opened
- 30 May 1933 - freight service discontinued
- 4 December 1934 - Suigun Line completed
- 1 October 1938 - became JNR Hakuhō Line
- 1 May 1941 - line nationalized
- 11 December 1944 - passenger service suspended and replaced by buses

== JR Bus Kanto Hakuhō Line ==
JR Bus Kanto operates the Hakuhō Line. Starting at Sobooka, the route serves Iwaki-Tanakura Station, Mimori, Yanamori, Matsunoue, Sekibe, and Nanko Park, ending either at Shin-Shirakawa Station via Shirakawa Station or reverse. Between Sekibe and Matsunoue, and Yanamori and Mimori buses use the former railway right of way which has been paved and converted to an exclusive bus-only road. Two commuter trips from Asahi-machi 2 chome operate inbound in the morning, and two are scheduled in the evening.

=== Fares ===
It costs ¥740 for an adult to ride from Iwaki-Tanakura to Shin-Shirakawa; ¥800 if going via Shirakawa Station. Travelers who have a Japan Rail Pass are allowed unlimited rides on the Hakuhō Line.
