= Higashimura =

Higashimura (東村) may refer to:

- Higashi, Fukushima (東村), a village in Japan also known as Higashi-mura
- Akiko Higashimura (東村 アキコ, born 1975), Japanese manga author
- Shin'ichi Higashimura (東村 新一, born 1952), the mayor of Fukui, Japan (2007–present)
