= Nakatoyo Station =

Railway station in Tanagura, Fukushima Prefecture, Japan

Nakatoyo Station 中豊駅
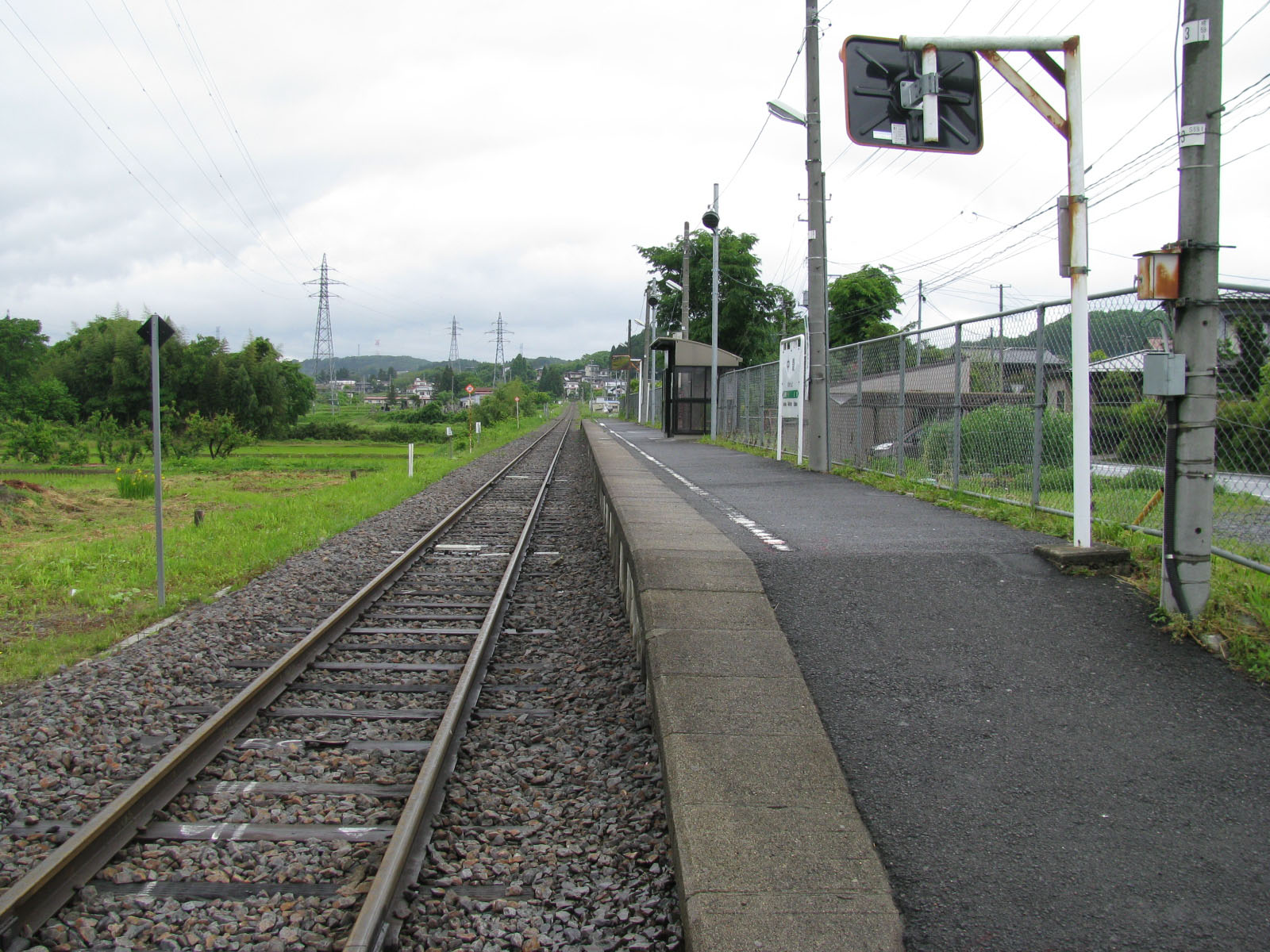
- Nakatoyo Station in May 2008

General information
- Location: Nagare Nakatoyo-Noto 43, Tanagura-machi, Higashishirakawa-gun, Fukushima-ken 963-5663; Japan
- Coordinates: 37.0225°N 140.3931°E
- Operator: JR East
- Line: ■ Suigun Line
- Distance: 90.5 km from Mito
- Platforms: 1 side platform
- Tracks: 2

Other information
- Status: Unstaffed
- Website: Official website

History
- Opened: February 1, 1958

Passengers

Services
Preceding station	JR East	Following station
Chikatsu towards Mito	Suigun Line	Iwaki-Tanakura towards Kōriyama
Location
- Location within Fukushima Prefecture Location within Japan

Nakatoyo Station (中豊駅, Nakatoyo-eki) is a railway station in the town of Tanagura, Fukushima, Japan operated by East Japan Railway Company (JR East).

== Lines ==
Nakatoyo Station is served by the Suigun Line, and is located 88.8 rail kilometers from the official starting point of the line at Mito.

== Station layout ==
The station has one side platform serving a single bi-directional track. The station is unattended. There is no station building, but only a small waiting booth on the platform.

== History ==
Nakatoyo Station opened on February 1, 1958. The station was absorbed into the JR East network upon the privatization of the Japanese National Railways (JNR) on April 1, 1987.

== Surrounding area ==
- National Route 118
- National Route 289

== See also ==
- List of railway stations in Japan
