= Izumizaki Cave Tomb =

Archaeological site in Japan

- 泉崎横穴古墳 (Japanese)
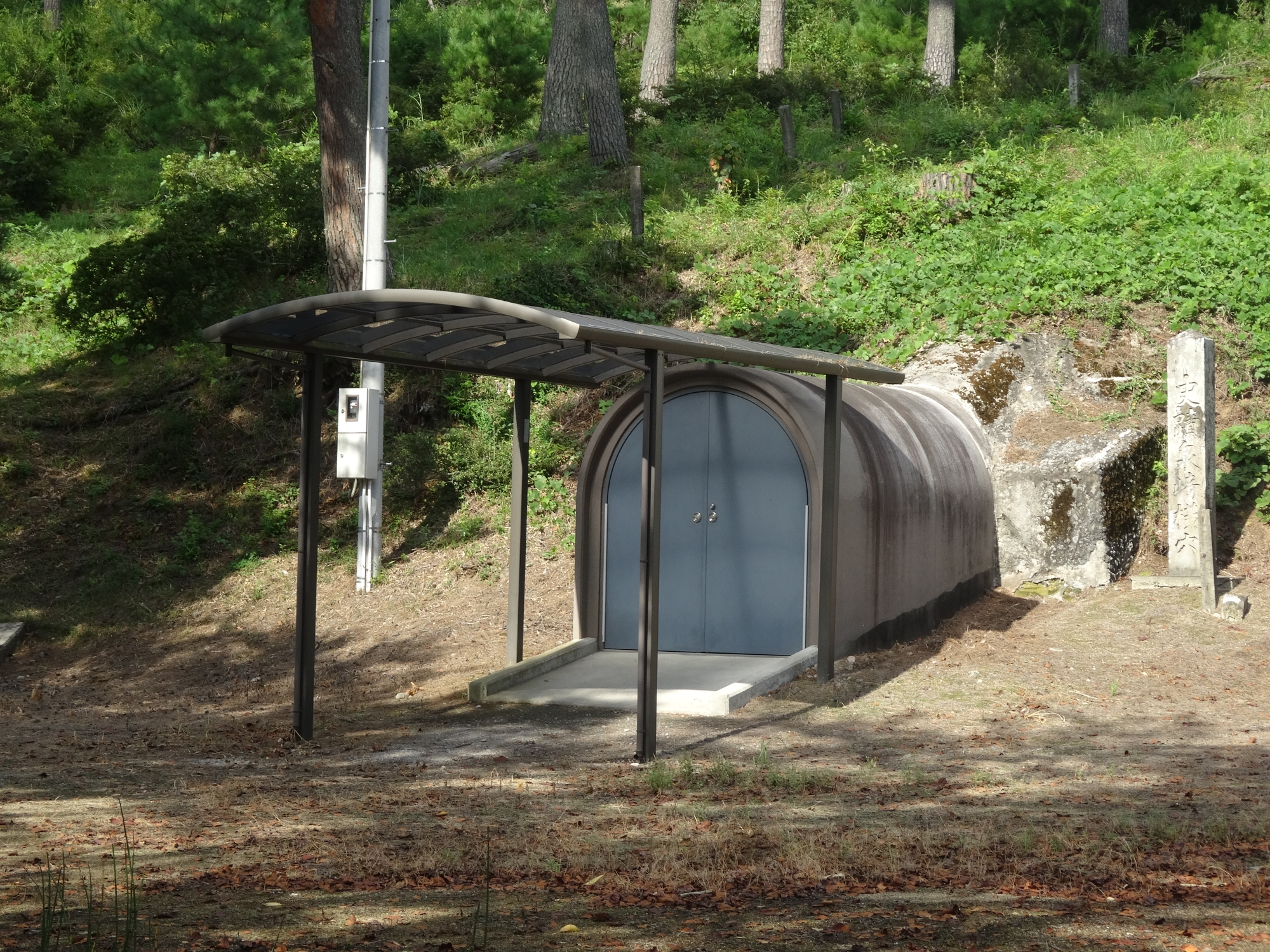
- Izumizaki Cave Tomb

- Izumizaki Cave Tomb Izumizaki Cave Tomb (Japan)
- 37°09′9.7″N 140°19′2.0″E
- Type: Yokoanabo
- Periods: Kofun period
- Location: Izumizaki, Fukushima, Japan
- Region: Tōhoku region

History
- Built: early 7th century AD

Site notes
- Excavation dates: 1933
- Public access: No

The Izumizaki Cave Tomb (泉崎横穴古墳) is a Kofun period decorated yokoanabo (横穴墓), tunnel tomb in an artificial cave, located in an archaeological site in the village of Izumizaki, Fukushima in the southern Tōhoku region of northern Japan. It was granted protection as a National Historic Site in 1934.

== Overview ==
The cave-tomb dates from the end of the 6th century to the beginning of the 7th century. It is located on the slope of a tuff hill on the northern shore of the Izumi River, and was discovered in 1933 during the prefectural road expansion work, and was the first decorative cave tomb found in the Tōhoku region.

The tomb is approximately 2.1 meters square and has a 1.15 meter house-shaped opening and domed ceiling. It is significant in that it is a decorated kofun with depictions of men, women, animals, boats, horses and eddy patterns, painted in red on the back wall, side walls, and ceiling of the burial chamber. Such decorated kofun occur primary in Kyushu, and this is one of the northernmost example yet discovered and indicates the penetration of Kofun period culture into lands traditionally considered part of the Emishi cultural zone. A small number of grave goods were recovered, including straight swords and copper rings

There are seven tombs located on the same site, two of which were discovered in 1914 with the remaining five including Izumizaki Cave Tomb discovered in 1933, though the Izumizaki Cave Tomb is the only one of the group which is decorated. The tomb does not appear in any historical records and the name of rank of the person buried within is unknown; however, as it is located only two kilometers from the Shirakawa Kanga ruins, it may have been the tomb of a leader of a gōzoku clan ruling this area before it came under full Yamato control.

The site is located about 30 minutes on foot from Izumizaki Station on the JR East Tōhoku Main Line. It is normally closed, but a mural full-size photo panel is on display at the Izumizaki Museum in front of Izumizaki Station.

== See also ==
- List of Historic Sites of Japan (Fukushima)
