= Shirasaka Station =

Railway station in Shirakawa, Fukushima Prefecture, Japan

Shirasaka Station 白坂駅
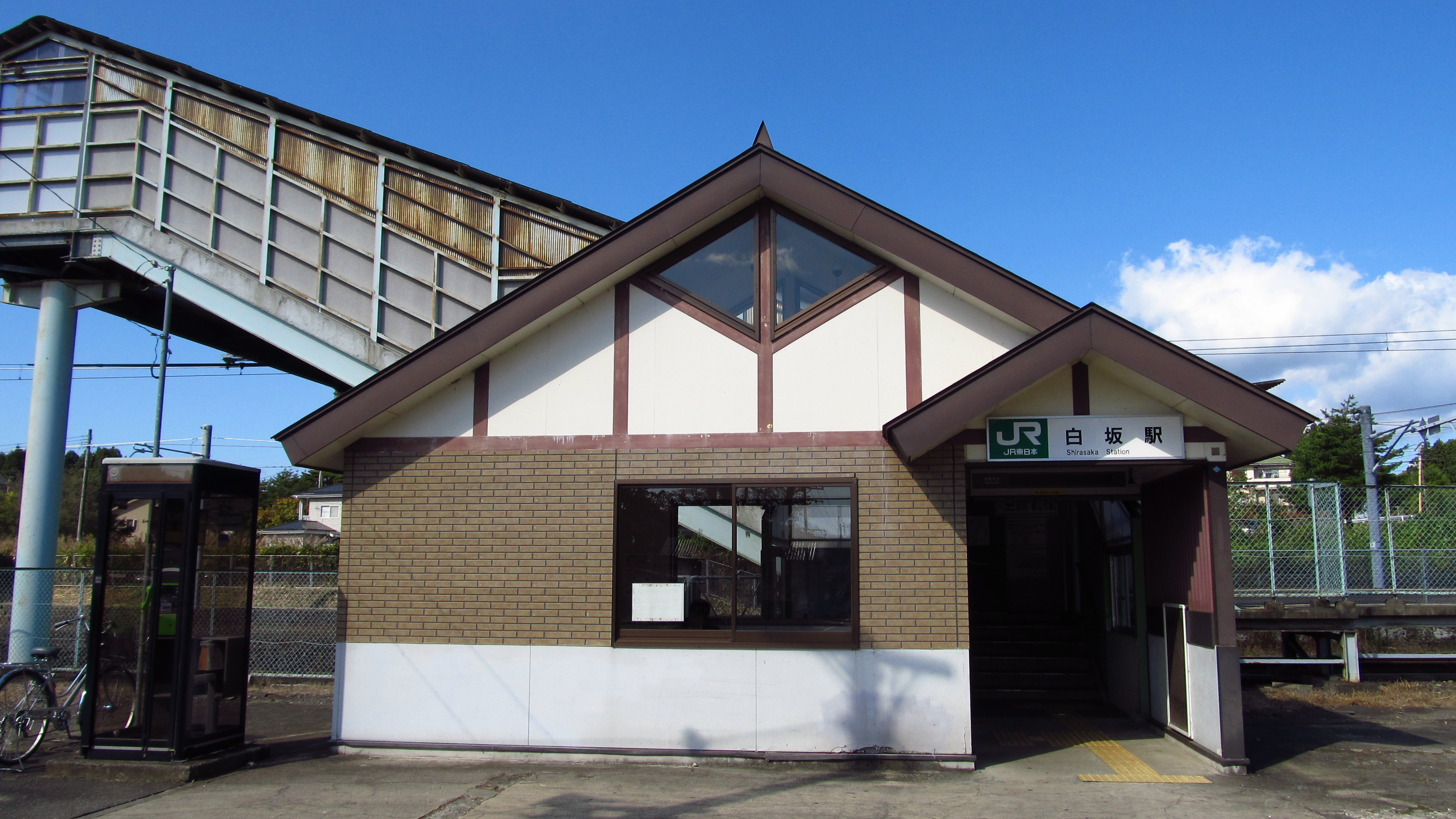
- Shirasaka Station in October 2015

General information
- Location: Shirasaka Okura Yagan 86, Shirakawa-shi, Fukushima-ken 961–0835; Japan
- Coordinates: 37.0947°N 140.1843°E
- Operator: JR East
- Line: ■ Tōhoku Main Line
- Distance: 182.0 km from Tokyo
- Platforms: 2 side platforms
- Tracks: 2

Other information
- Status: Unstaffed
- Website: Official website

History
- Opened: February 20, 1917

Passengers
- FY 2004: 63 daily

Services
| Preceding station | JR East | Following station |
|---|---|---|
| Toyohara towards Kuroiso | Tōhoku Main Line Local | Shin-Shirakawa towards Morioka |
Location
- Location within Fukushima Prefecture Location within Japan

Shirasaka Station (白坂駅, Shirasaka-eki) is a railway station in the city of Shirakawa, Fukushima Prefecture, Japan, operated by East Japan Railway Company (JR East).

== Lines ==
Shirasaka Station is served by the Tōhoku Main Line, and is located 182.0 rail kilometers from the official starting point of the line at Tokyo Station.

== Station layout ==
The station has two opposed side platforms connected to the station building by a footbridge. The station is unattended.

=== Platforms ===
| 1 | ■ Tōhoku Main Line | for Kuroiso and Utsunomiya |
| 2 | ■ Tōhoku Main Line | for Shirakawa and Kōriyama |

== History ==
Shirasaka Station opened on February 20, 1917. The station was absorbed into the JR East network upon the privatization of the Japanese National Railways (JNR) on April 1, 1987.

== Surrounding area ==
- Shirasaka Post Office
- Shirasaka Industrial Park
- National Route 294

== See also ==
- List of railway stations in Japan
