= Shirakawa Funada-Motonuma Sites =

Archaeological sites in Japan

- 白河舟田・本沼遺跡群 (Japanese)
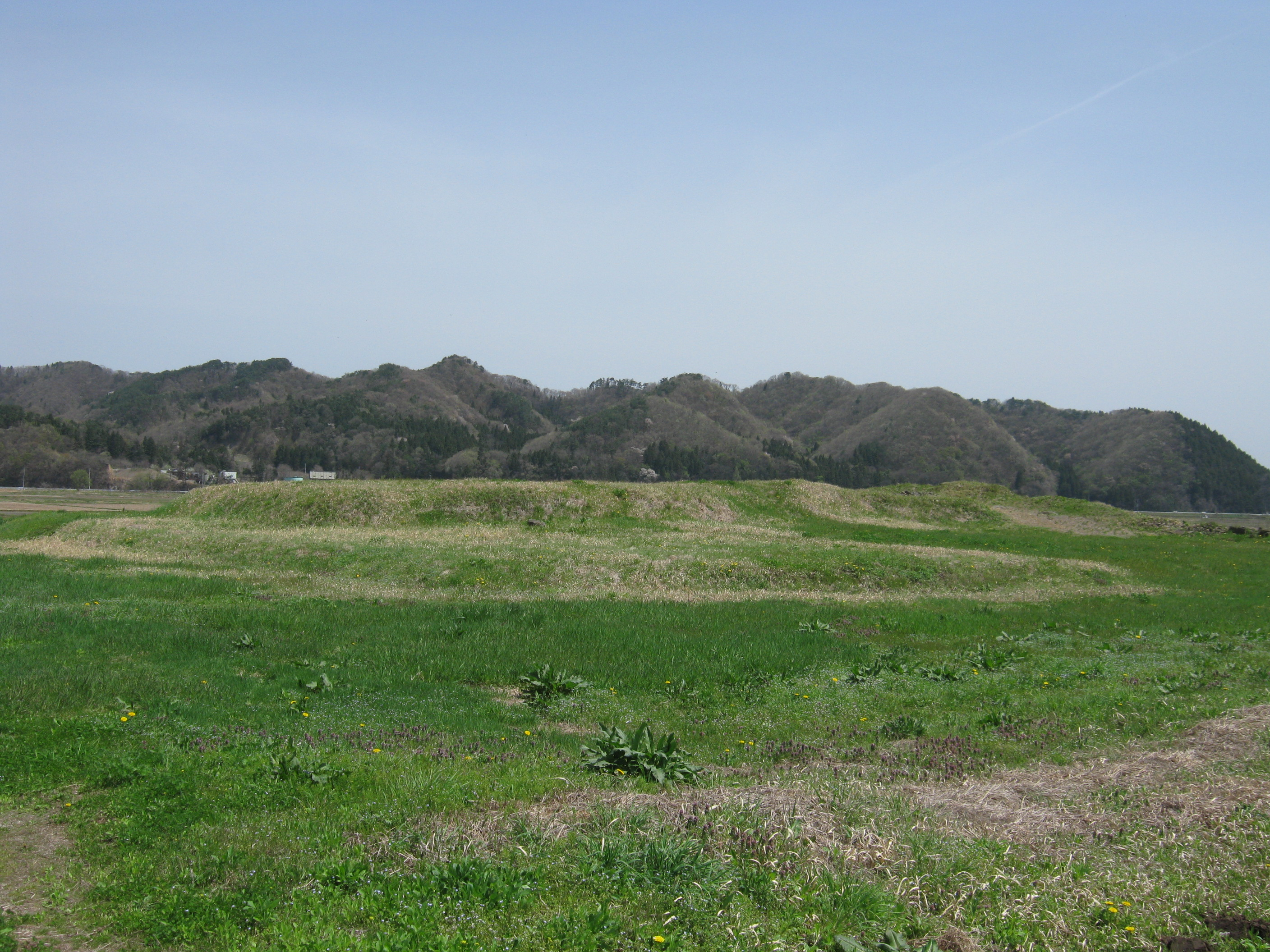
- Shimōsa-zuka kofun

- Shirakawa Funada-Motonuma Sites Shirakawa Funada-Motonuma Sites (Japan)
- 37°08′10″N 140°17′11″E
- Type: kofun, settlement
- Periods: Kofun period
- Location: Shirakawa, Fukushima, Japan
- Region: Tōhoku region

History
- Built: 6th century AD

Site notes
- Public access: Yes

Shirakawa Funada-Motonuma Sites (白河舟田・本沼遺跡群, Shirakawa Funada-Motonuma iseki gun) is a group of archaeological sites containing Kofun period ruins located on the river terraces and hill slopes upstream of the Abukuma River in what is now the city of Shirakawa, Fukushima in the southern Tōhoku region of Japan. The sites were collectively designated a National Historic Site of Japan in 2005.

== Overview ==
The National Historic Site designation covers three separate areas:

The Shimōsa-zuka kofun (下総塚古墳) is a keyhole-shaped kofun burial tumuli located on a river terrace on the Abukuma River at an altitude of 315 meters. The kofun has a length of 71.8 meters and a lateral burial chamber made from andesite blocks, with a length of seven meters. Te round portion has a diameter of 45.4 meters and the rectangular portion has maximum width of 63.3 meters. It was surrounded by a moat with a width ranging from 9 to 15 meters. The tumulus was first excavated in 1938, and subsequently in 1996–1997 and 2000–2002. Numerous fragments of cylindrical and figurine haniwa were recovered from the site, but their placement is unknown. The kofun is estimated to date from the second half of the sixth century, and per local legend is the grave of the Shirakawa miyatsuko, or local ruler of the area.

The Funada-nakamichi site (舟田中道遺跡) is the remains of a fortified residence located 315 meters to the northwest of the Shimōsa-zuka kofun, sharing the same river terrace. Traces of a wooden palisade and pit dwellings have been found along with the ruins of a large house with sides measuring 70 meters. These ruins are estimated to date from the second half of the sixth century to the first half of the seventh century, and are assumed to be the residence of the Shirakawa miyatsuko. The site was excavated from 1996 to 1999.

The Yachikubo kofun (谷地久保古墳) is a tomb structure located on the south slope of the hill of about 1.8 kilometers northwest from the above ruins. The hill has steep sides to the north, west and east and is flat towards the south, where a circular tumulus with a diameter of about 17 meters. It was surveyed in 1926 and 1983, and excavated in 2003. It is similar in construction and location to tombs more typically found in the Kansai region of Japan. Although no burial chamber or grave goods were found, fragments of stones indicate that its construction is from the final phase of the Kofun period, or from the end of the 7th century to the beginning of the 8th century.

The site is about 15 minutes by car from Kutano Station on the JR East Tōhoku Main Line.

== See also ==
- List of Historic Sites of Japan (Fukushima)
