= Chikatsu Station =

Railway station in Tanagura, Fukushima Prefecture, Japan

Chikatsu Station 近津駅
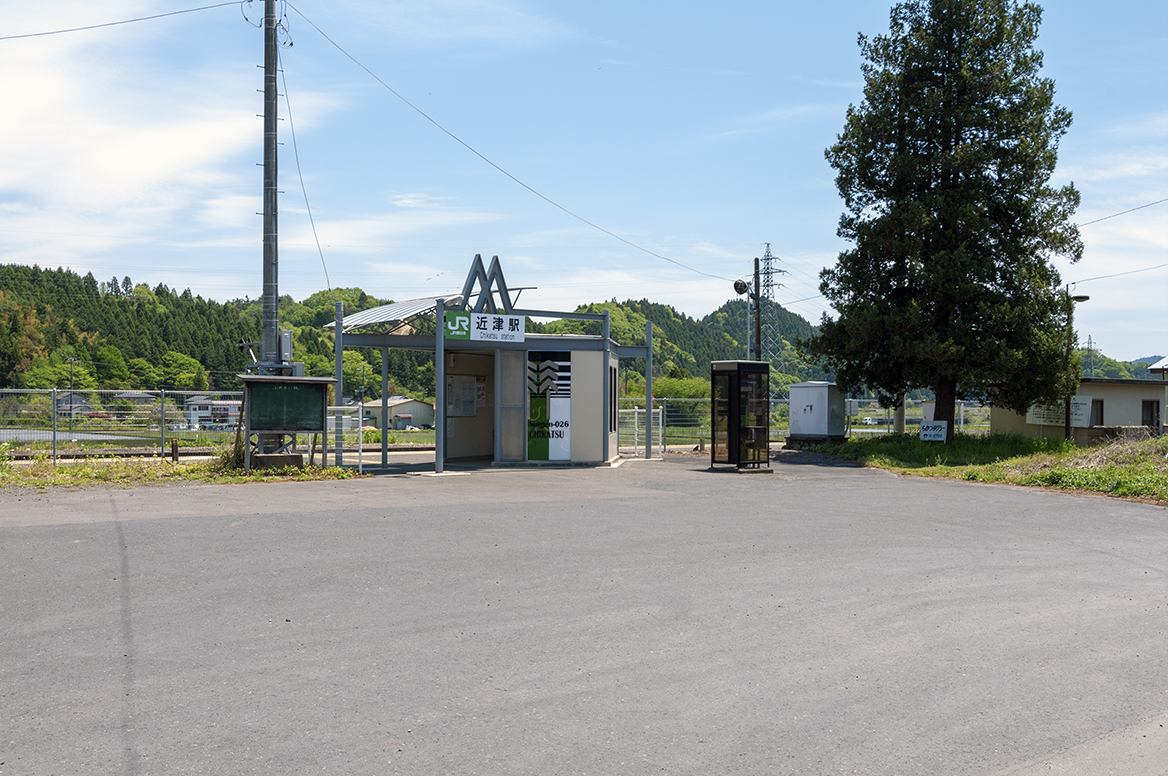
- Chikatsu Station in May 2008

General information
- Location: Terayama Takaseda 19, Tanagura-machi, Higashishirakawa-gun, Fukushima-ken 963-5671; Japan
- Coordinates: 37.0007°N 140.3935°E
- Operator: JR East
- Line: ■ Suigun Line
- Distance: 86.4 km from Mito
- Platforms: 1 side platform

Other information
- Status: Unstaffed
- Website: Official website

History
- Opened: November 11, 1932

Passengers

Services
Preceding station	JR East	Following station
Iwaki-Hanawa towards Mito	Suigun Line	Nakatoyo towards Kōriyama
Location
- Location within Fukushima Prefecture Location within Japan

Chikatsu Station (近津駅, Chikatsu-eki) is a railway station on the Suigun Line in the town of Tanagura, Fukushima, Japan operated by East Japan Railway Company (JR East).

== Lines ==
Chikatsu Station is served by the Suigun Line, and is located 86.4 kilometers from the official starting point of the line at Mito.

== Station layout ==
Chikatsu Station has one side platform serving a single bi-directional track. The station is unattended. The station formerly had two side platforms, and the unused side platform remains in place.

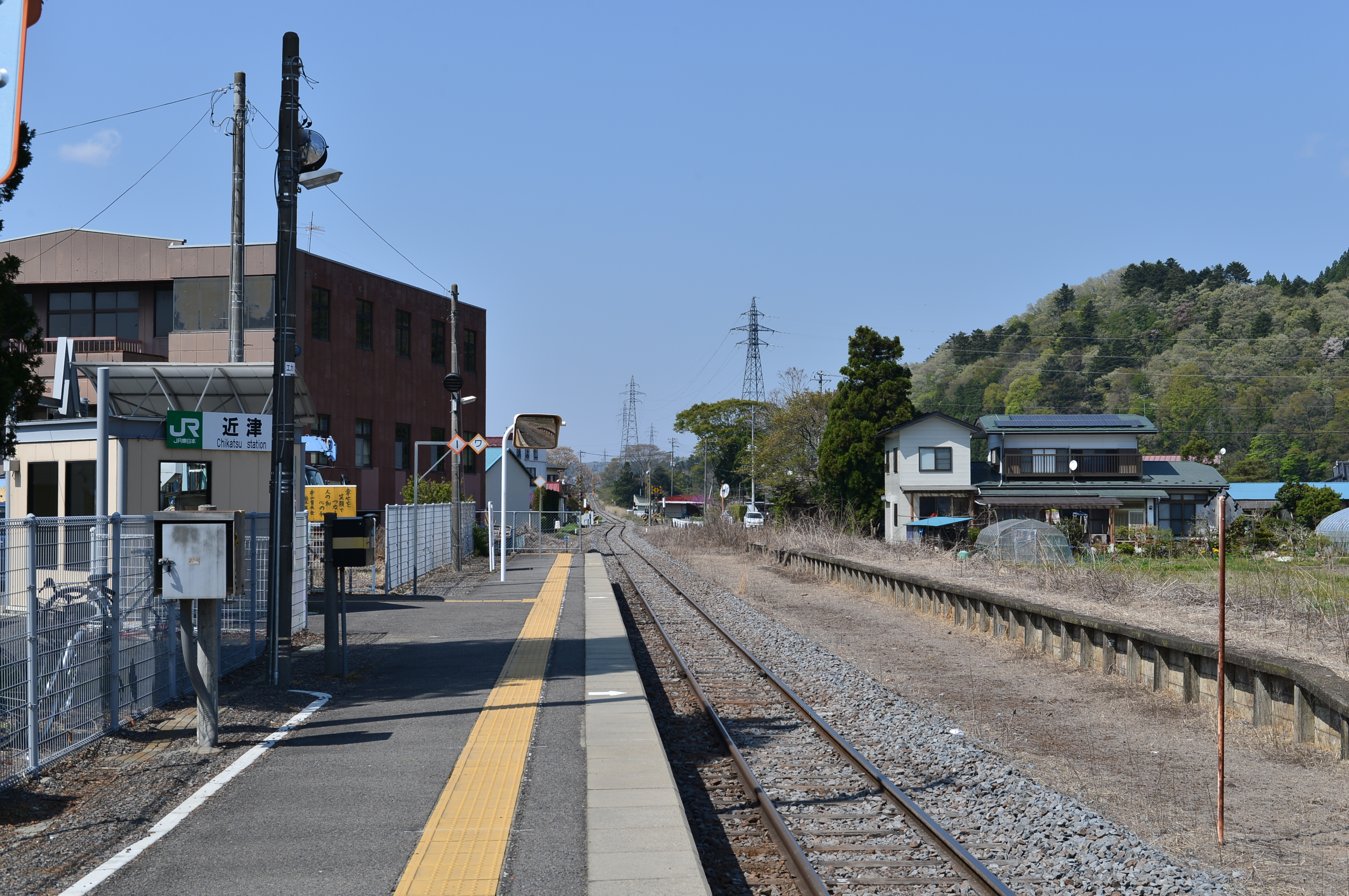
View of the station platform

== History ==
Chikatsu Station opened on November 11, 1932. The station was absorbed into the JR East network upon the privatization of the Japanese National Railways (JNR) on April 1, 1987.

== Surrounding area ==
- National Route 118
- National Route 289
- Chikatsu Post Office

== See also ==
- List of railway stations in Japan
