= Iwaki-Hanawa Station =

Railway station in Hanawa, Fukushima Prefecture, Japan

Iwaki-Hanawa Station 磐城塙駅
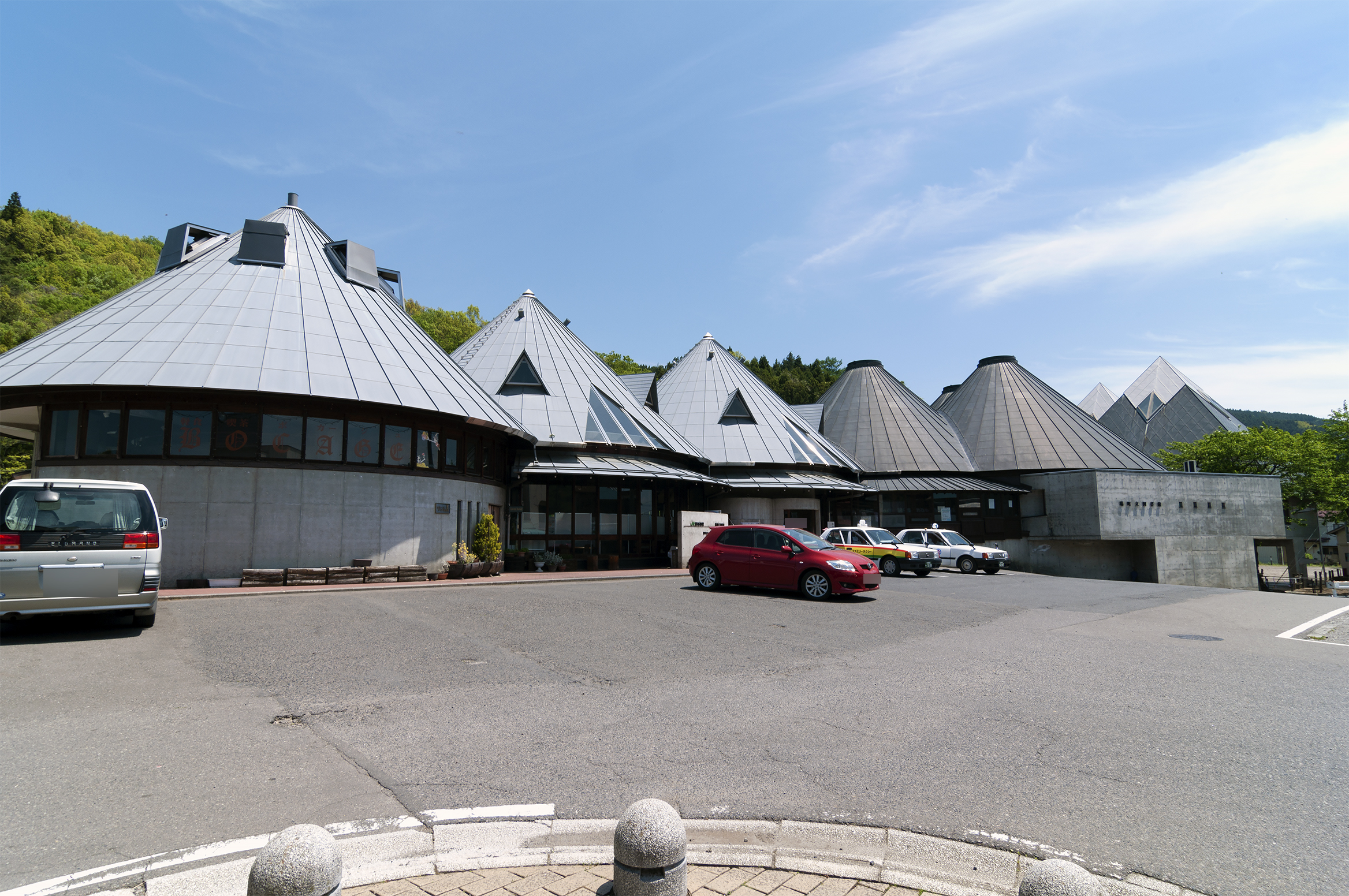
- Iwaki-Hanawa Station in May 2011

General information
- Location: Hanawa Miyata-cho 1-4, Hanawa-machi, Higashishirakawa-gun, Fukushima-ken 963-5405; Japan
- Coordinates: 36.9585°N 140.4121°E
- Operator: JR East
- Line: ■ Suigun Line
- Distance: 81.3 km from Mito
- Platforms: 2 side platforms
- Tracks: 2

Other information
- Status: Staffed
- Website: Official website

History
- Opened: October 10, 1931

Passengers
- FY2018: 188 daily

Services
Preceding station	JR East	Following station
Iwaki-Ishii towards Mito	Suigun Line	Chikatsu towards Kōriyama
Location
- Location within Fukushima Prefecture Location within Japan

Iwaki-Hanawa Station (磐城塙駅, Iwaki-Hanawa-eki) is a railway station in the town of Hanawa, Fukushima, Japan operated by East Japan Railway Company (JR East).

== Lines ==
Iwaki-Hanawa Station is served by the Suigun Line, and is located 81.3 rail kilometers from the official starting point of the line at Mito.

== Station layout ==
The station has two opposed side platforms connected to the station building by a footbridge. The station is staffed.

=== Platforms ===
1	■ Suigun Line	for Iwaki-Ishikawa and Kōriyama
2	■ Suigun Line	Mito

== History ==
Iwaki-Hanawa Station opened on October 10, 1931. The station was absorbed into the JR East network upon the privatization of the Japanese National Railways (JNR) on April 1, 1987.

== Passenger statistics ==
In fiscal 2018, the station was used by an average of 188 passengers daily (boarding passengers only).

== Surrounding area ==
- National Route 118
- National Route 289
- Hanawa Town Hall
- Hanawa Post Office

== See also ==
- List of railway stations in Japan
