= Satoshiraishi Station =

Railway station in Asakawa, Fukushima Prefecture, Japan

Satoshiraishi Station 里白石駅
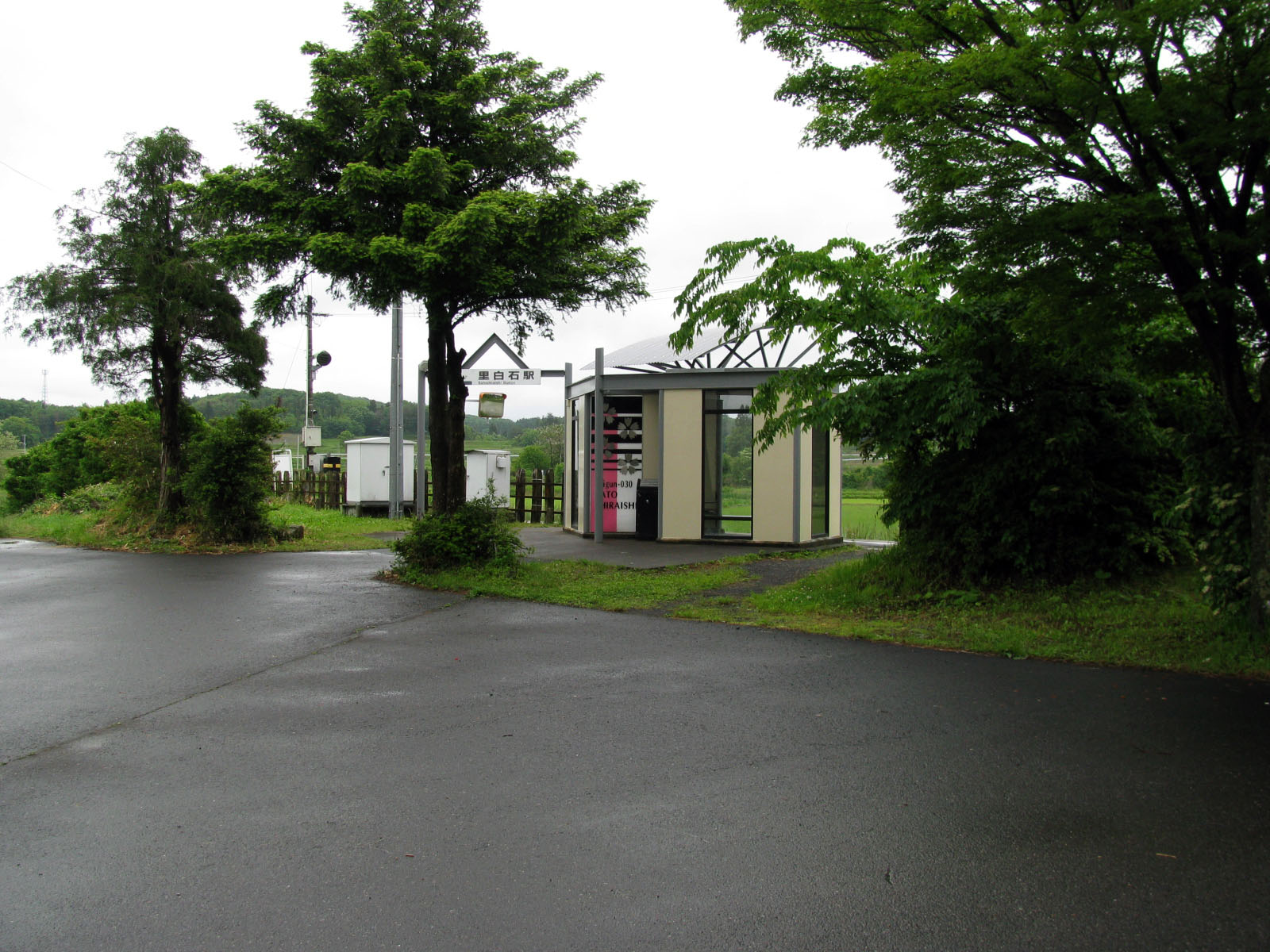
- Satoshiraishi Station in May 2008

General information
- Location: Satoshiraishi Shukuura 126, Asakawa-machi, Ishikawa-gun, Fukushima-ken 963-6202; Japan
- Coordinates: 37.1041°N 140.4169°E
- Operator: JR East
- Line: ■ Suigun Line
- Distance: 100.0 km from Mito
- Platforms: 1 side platform
- Tracks: 1

Other information
- Status: Unstaffed
- Website: Official website

History
- Opened: December 4, 1934

Passengers

Services
Preceding station	JR East	Following station
Iwaki-Asakawa towards Mito	Suigun Line	Iwaki-Ishikawa towards Kōriyama
Location
- Location within Fukushima Prefecture Location within Japan

Satoshiraishi Station (里白石駅, Satoshiraishi-eki) is a railway station in the town of Asakawa, Fukushima, Japan operated by East Japan Railway Company (JR East).

== Lines ==
Satoshiraishi Station is served by the Suigun Line, and is located 100.0 rail kilometers from the official starting point of the line at Mito.

== Station layout ==
Satoshiraishi Station has one side platform serving a single bi-directional track. The station is unattended.

== History ==
The station opened on December 4, 1934. The station was absorbed into the JR East network upon the privatization of the Japanese National Railways (JNR) on April 1, 1987.

== Surrounding area ==
- National Route 118

== See also ==
- List of railway stations in Japan
