= Taishin, Fukushima =

Dissolved municipality in Fukushima prefecture, Japan

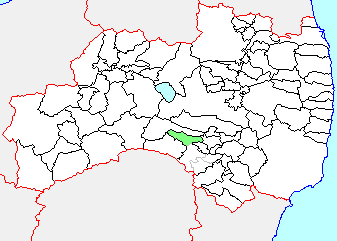
Map of Taishin, Fukushima

Taishin (大信村, Taishin-mura) was a village located in Nishishirakawa District, Fukushima Prefecture, Japan.

On November 7, 2005, Taishin, along with the villages of Higashi and Omotegō (all from Nishishirakawa District) was merged into the expanded city of Shirakawa.

As of 2003, the village had an estimated population of 4,790 and a density of 59.30 persons per km^{2}. The total area was 80.77 km^{2}.
