= Nishigō, Fukushima =

Nishigō 西郷村
- Village
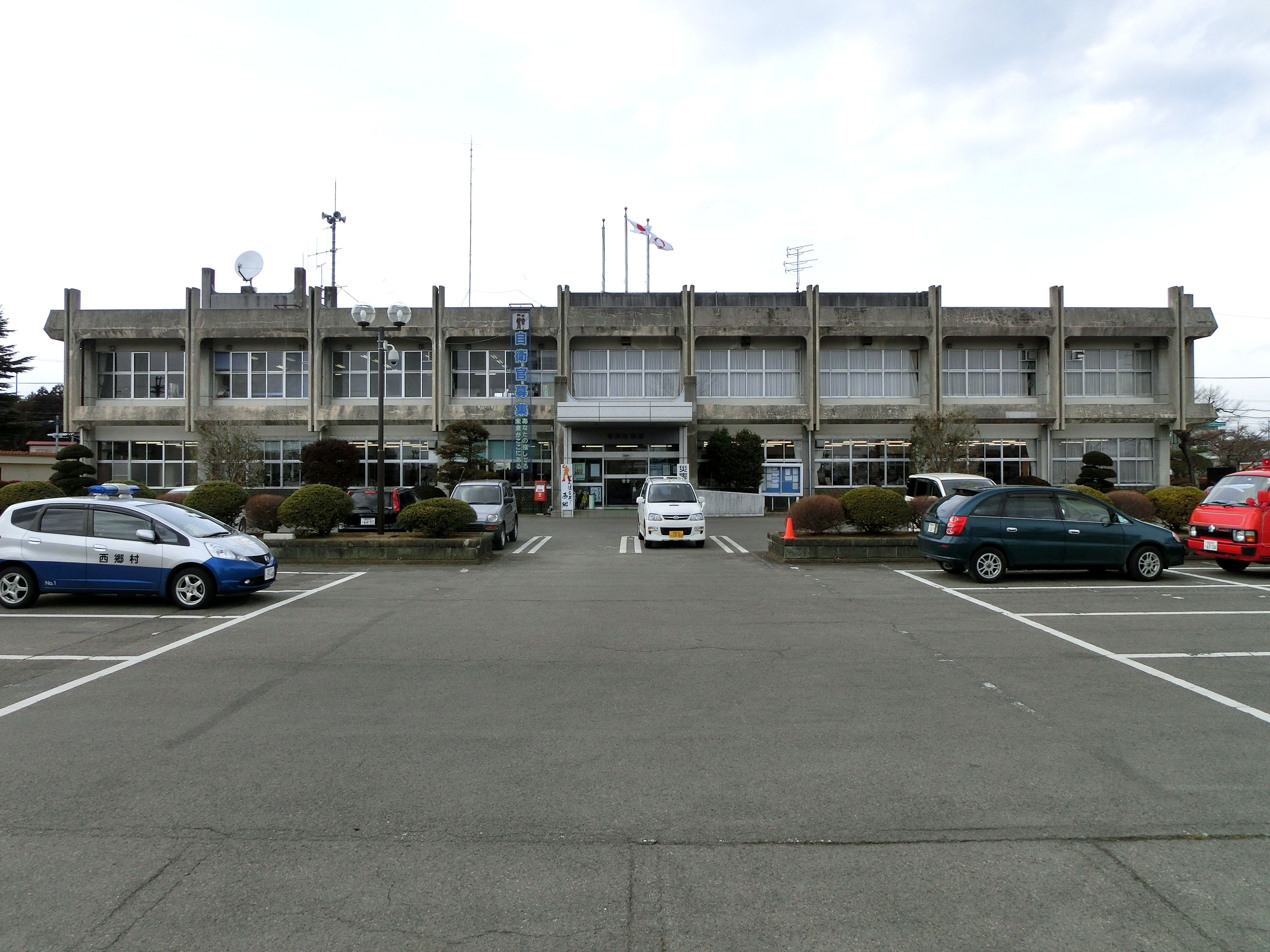
- Nishigō Village Hall

- Flag Seal

- Location of Nishigō in Fukushima Prefecture

- Coordinates: 37°8′30.1″N 140°9′19.3″E
- Country: Japan
- Region: Tōhoku
- Prefecture: Fukushima
- District: Nishishirakawa

Area
  - Total: 192.06 km^{2} (74.15 sq mi)

Population (March 2020)
  - Total: 20,351
  - Density: 105.96/km^{2} (274.44/sq mi)
- Time zone: UTC+9 (Japan Standard Time)
- City symbols
  - Tree: Quercus dentata
  - Flower: Lysichiton camtschatcensis, rhododendron
  - Bird: Green pheasant
- Phone number: 0248-52-2111
- Address: Kumakura Orikuchihara 40-banchi Nishigō-mura, Nishishirakawa-gun, Fukushima-ken 961-8091
- Website: Official website

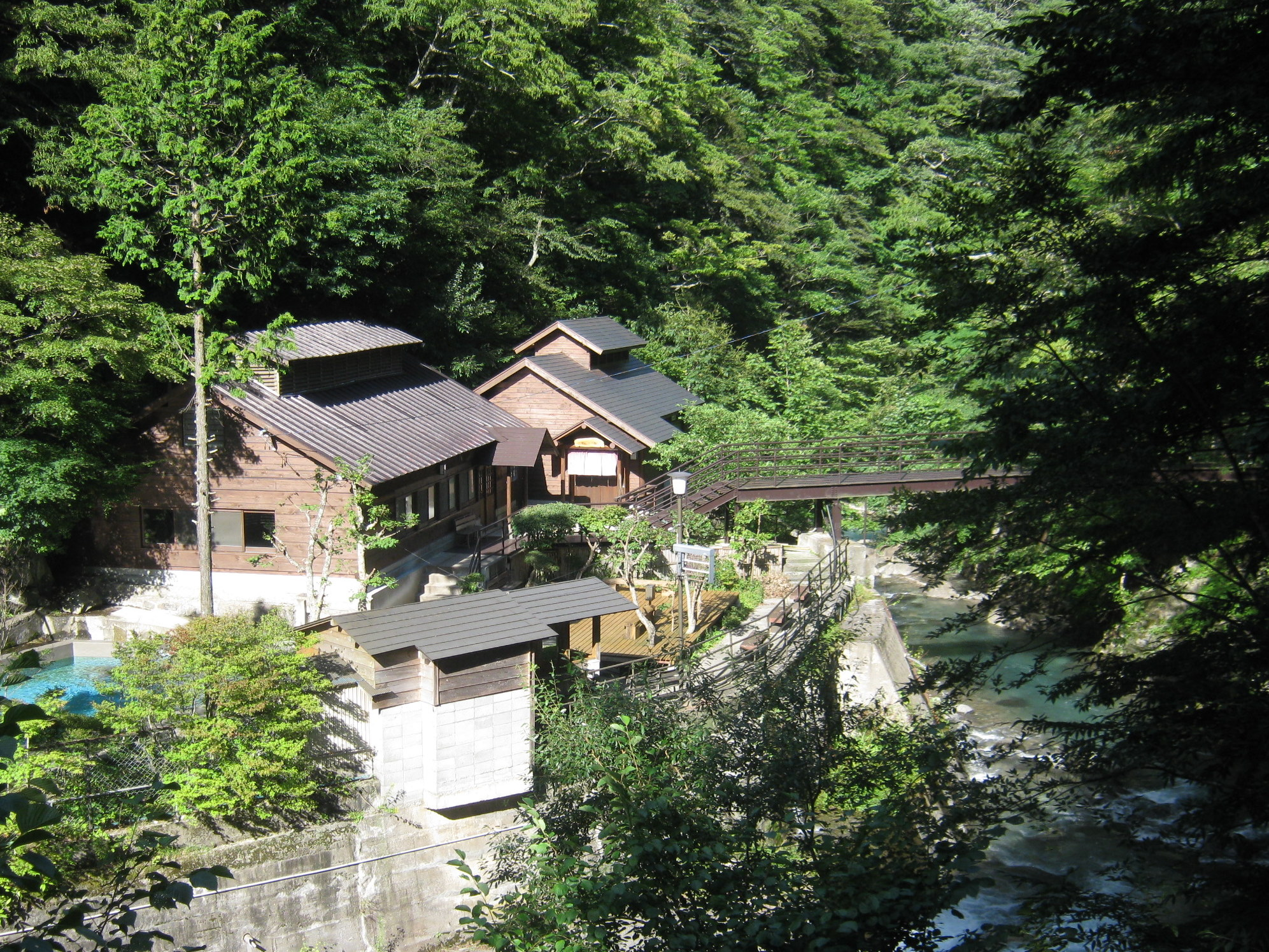
Kashi Onsen

Nishigō (西郷村, Nishigō-mura) is a village located in Fukushima Prefecture, Japan. As of 1 March 2020, the village had an estimated population of 20,351 in 7618 households and a population density of 110 persons per km^{2}. The total area of the village was 192.06 square kilometres (74.15 sq mi)..

== Geography ==
Nishigō is located in the upper reaches of the Abukuma River valley in south-central Fukushima prefecture, bordered by Tochigi Prefecture to the south. It is about 185 km north of Tokyo.

- Mountains: Sanbonyaridake (1916.9m)
- Rivers: Abukuma River
- Lakes: Nishigō Dam, Akasaka Dam

=== Neighboring municipalities ===
- Fukushima Prefecture
  - Shimogō
  - Shirakawa
  - Ten'ei
- Tochigi Prefecture
  - Nasu
  - Nasushiobara

== Demographics ==
Per Japanese census data, the population of Nishigō has increased over the past 50 years.

Historical population
Year	Pop.	±%
1920	6,500	—
1930	7,059	+8.6%
1940	7,523	+6.6%
1950	11,438	+52.0%
1960	11,373	−0.6%
1970	10,454	−8.1%
1980	12,744	+21.9%
1990	16,194	+27.1%
2000	18,642	+15.1%
2010	19,767	+6.0%
2020	20,808	+5.3%

== Climate ==
Nishigō has a humid subtropical climate (Köppen climate classification Cfa). The average annual temperature in Nishigō is 10.0 °C (50.0 °F). The average annual rainfall is 1,438 mm (56.6 in) with September as the wettest month. The temperatures are highest on average in August, at around 25.4 °C (77.7 °F), and lowest in January, at around 0.9 °C (33.6 °F).

== History ==
The area of present-day Nishigō was part of ancient Mutsu Province. The area was part of the holdings of Shirakawa Domain during the Edo period. After the Meiji Restoration, it was organized as part of Nishishirakawa District in the Nakadōri region of Iwaki Province. Nishigō Village was formed on April 1, 1889 with the creation of the modern municipalities system.

== Economy ==
Nishigō has a mixed economy of agriculture and light/precision manufacturing, and is also a bedroom community with many people using the Tohoku Shinkansen to Tokyo, which is 90 minutes away.

== Education ==
Nishigō has five public elementary schools and three public middle schools operated by the town government. The town does not have a high school; however, the Fukushima Prefectural Board of Education does operate one special education school.

- Middle schools
  - Kawatani Middle School
  - Nishigō First Middle School
  - Nishigō Second Middle School
- Elementary schools
  - Habuto Elementary School
  - Kawatani Elementary School
  - Kumakura Elementary School
  - Odakura Elementary School
  - Yone Elementary School

== Transportation ==
=== Railway ===
JR East – Tōhoku Shinkansen

- Shin-Shirakawa

JR East – Tōhoku Main Line

- Shin-Shirakawa

=== Highway ===
- Tōhoku Expressway – Shirakawa Interchange
- National Route 4
- National Route 289

== Notable people from Nishigō ==
- Fumihiro Suzuki, professional baseball player
- Toshiyuki Yanuki, professional baseball player
