= Toshiyuki Yanuki =

Japanese baseball player

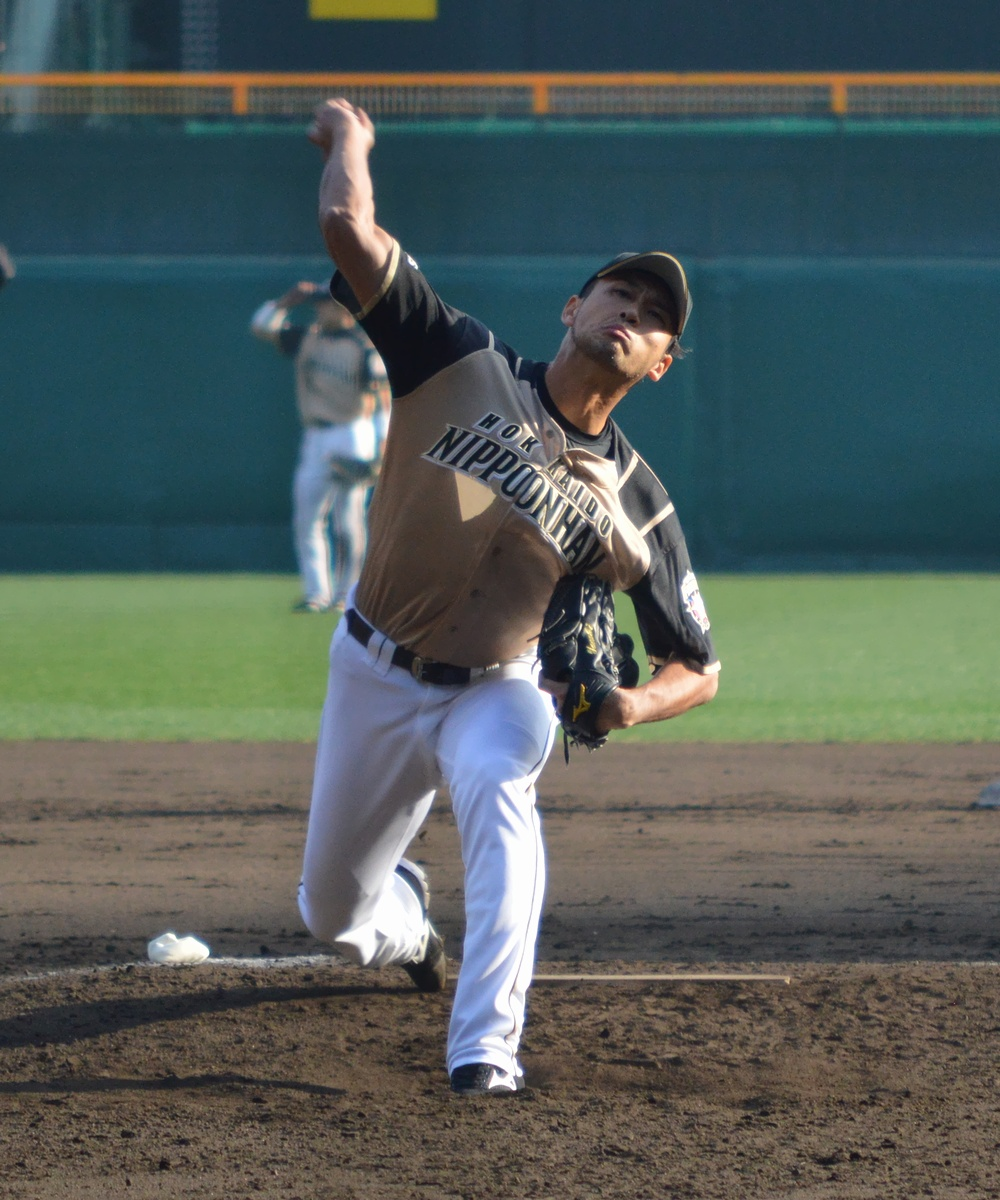
- Yanuki with the Hokkaido Nippon Ham-Fighters

Yomiuri Giants – No. 107
- Pitcher / Coach
- Born: December 15, 1983 (age 42); Nishigō, Fukushima
- Bats: Right Throws: Right

debut
- 2010, for the Hokkaido Nippon-Ham Fighters

Career statistics (through 2016 season)
- Win–loss record: 6-8
- Earned run average: 3.76
- Strikeouts: 150
- Stats at Baseball Reference

Teams
- Hokkaido Nippon-Ham Fighters (2009–2015); Yomiuri Giants (2015–2016); As coach: Yomiuri Giants (2021–)

Toshiyuki Yanuki (矢貫 俊之, Yanuki Toshiyuki) is a Japanese professional baseball player. He was born on December 15, 1983. He debuted in 2010. He had 59 strikeouts in 2013 for the Yomiuri Giants.
