= Izumizaki, Fukushima =

Izumizaki 泉崎村
- Village
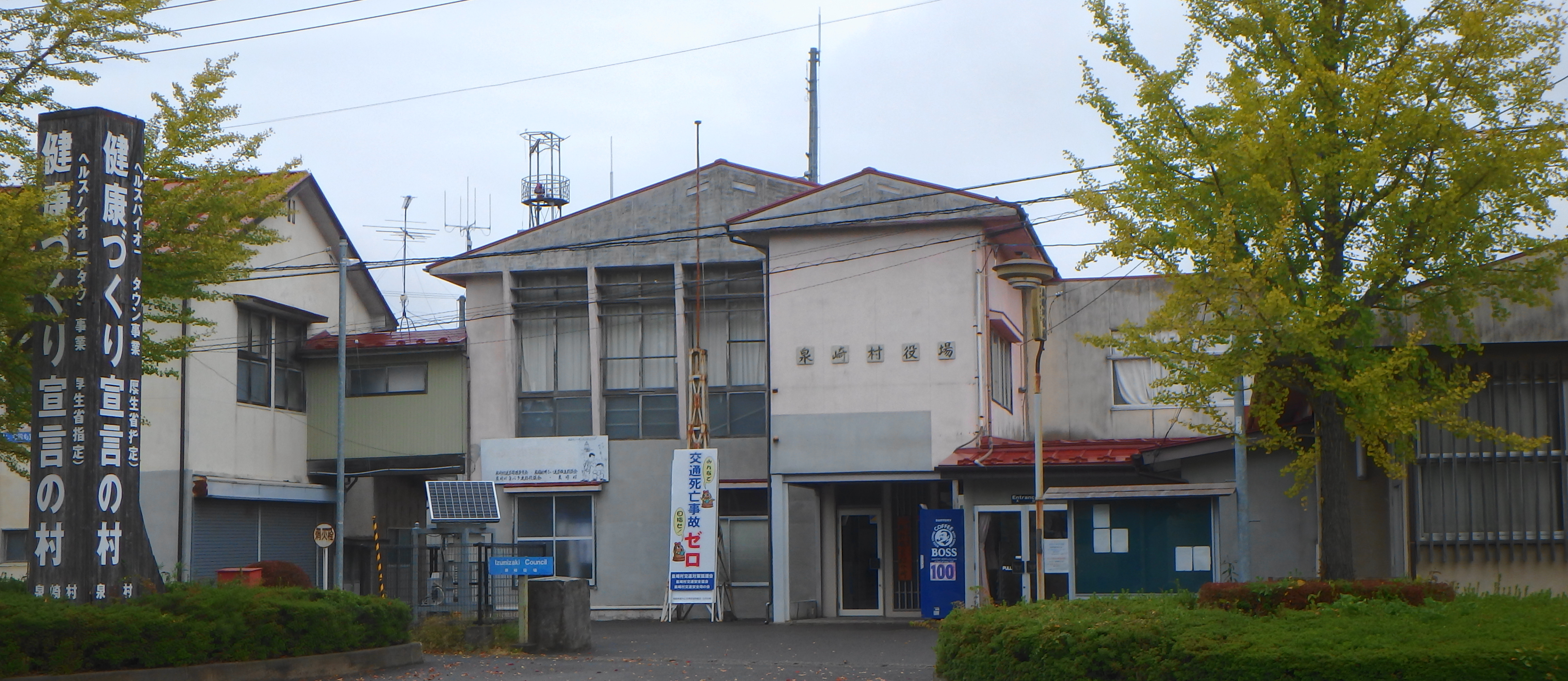
- Izumizaki Town Hall

- Flag Seal

- Location of Izumizaki in Fukushima Prefecture

- Coordinates: 37°9′25″N 140°17′43.3″E
- Country: Japan
- Region: Tōhoku
- Prefecture: Fukushima
- District: Nishishirakawa

Area
  - Total: 35.43 km^{2} (13.68 sq mi)

Population (March 2020)
  - Total: 6,265
  - Density: 176.8/km^{2} (458.0/sq mi)
- Time zone: UTC+9 (Japan Standard Time)
- Tree: Ginkgo biloba
- Flower: Rhododendron indicum
- Phone number: 0248-53-2111
- Address: Hachimaru 145, Izumizaki-mura, Nishishirakawa-gun, Fukushima-ken 969-0101
- Website: Official website

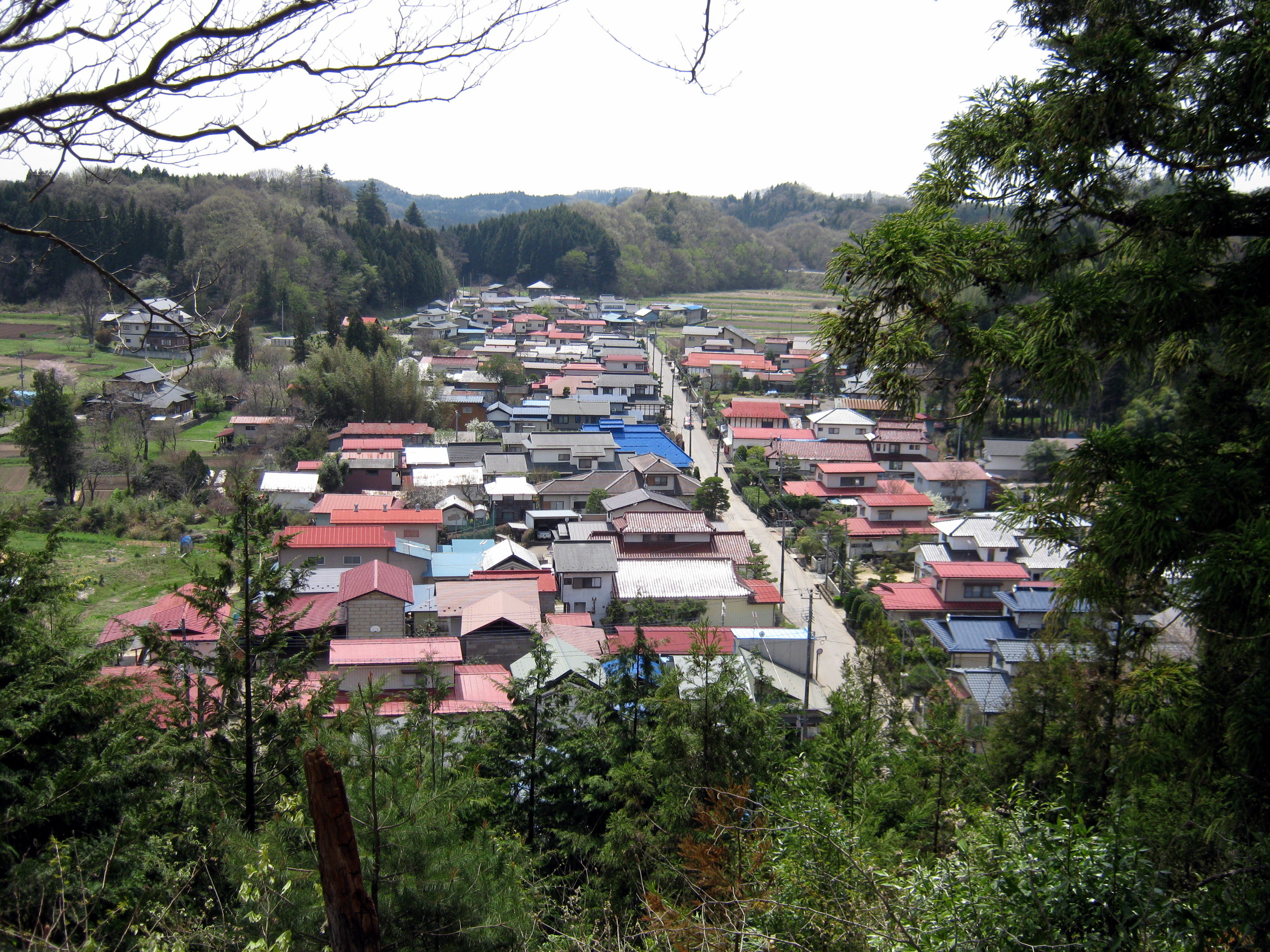
Otagawa-juku on the former Ōshū Kaidō

Izumizaki (泉崎村, Izumizaki-mura) is a village located in Fukushima Prefecture, Japan. As of 1 March 2020, the village had an estimated population of 6,265 in 2179 households, and a population density of 180 persons per km². The total area of the village was 35.43 square kilometres (13.68 sq mi).

== Geography ==
Izumizaki is located in the flatlands of south-central Fukushima prefecture.

=== Neighboring municipalities ===
- Fukushima Prefecture
  - Nakajima
  - Shirakawa
  - Yabuki

== Demographics ==
Per Japanese census data, the population of Izumizaki has remained relatively stable over the past 80 years.

Historical population
Year	Pop.	±%
1920	4,157	—
1930	4,699	+13.0%
1940	5,130	+9.2%
1950	6,957	+35.6%
1960	6,541	−6.0%
1970	5,490	−16.1%
1980	5,577	+1.6%
1990	6,656	+19.3%
2000	6,823	+2.5%
2010	6,802	−0.3%

== Climate ==
Izumizaki has a humid subtropical climate (Köppen climate classification Cfa). The average annual temperature in Izumizaki is 11.6 °C (52.9 °F). The average annual rainfall is 1,333 mm (52.5 in) with September as the wettest month.

- Rivers: Abukuma River, Izumi River

== History ==
The area of present-day Izumizaki was part of ancient Mutsu Province and the area has many burial mounds from the Kofun period. The area was divided between part of the holdings of Shirakawa Domain, Kasama Domain and tenryō territory held directly by the Tokugawa shogunate during the Edo period. After the Meiji Restoration, it was organized as part of Nishishirakawa District in the Nakadōri region of Iwaki Province. The villages of Izumizaki and Sekihira were established with the creation of the modern municipalities system on April 1, 1889. The two villages merged in 1954.

== Economy ==
The economy of Izumizaki is primarily agricultural.

== Education ==
Izumizaki has two public elementary schools and one public junior high school operated by the village government. The village does not have a high school.

- Izumizaki Middle School
- Izumizaki First Elementary School
- Izumizaki Second Elementary School

== Transportation ==
=== Railway ===
JR East – Tōhoku Main Line

- Izumizaki

=== Highway ===
- National Route 4

== Local attractions ==
- Izumizaki Cave Tomb (National Historic Site)
- Izumisaki International Cycling Stadium
- Shirakawa Kanga ruins (National Historic Site)

== Noted people from Izumizaki ==
- Tamanoshima Arata, sumo wrestler
