= Izumizaki Station =

Railway station in Izumizaki, Fukushima Prefecture, Japan

Izumizaki Station 泉崎駅
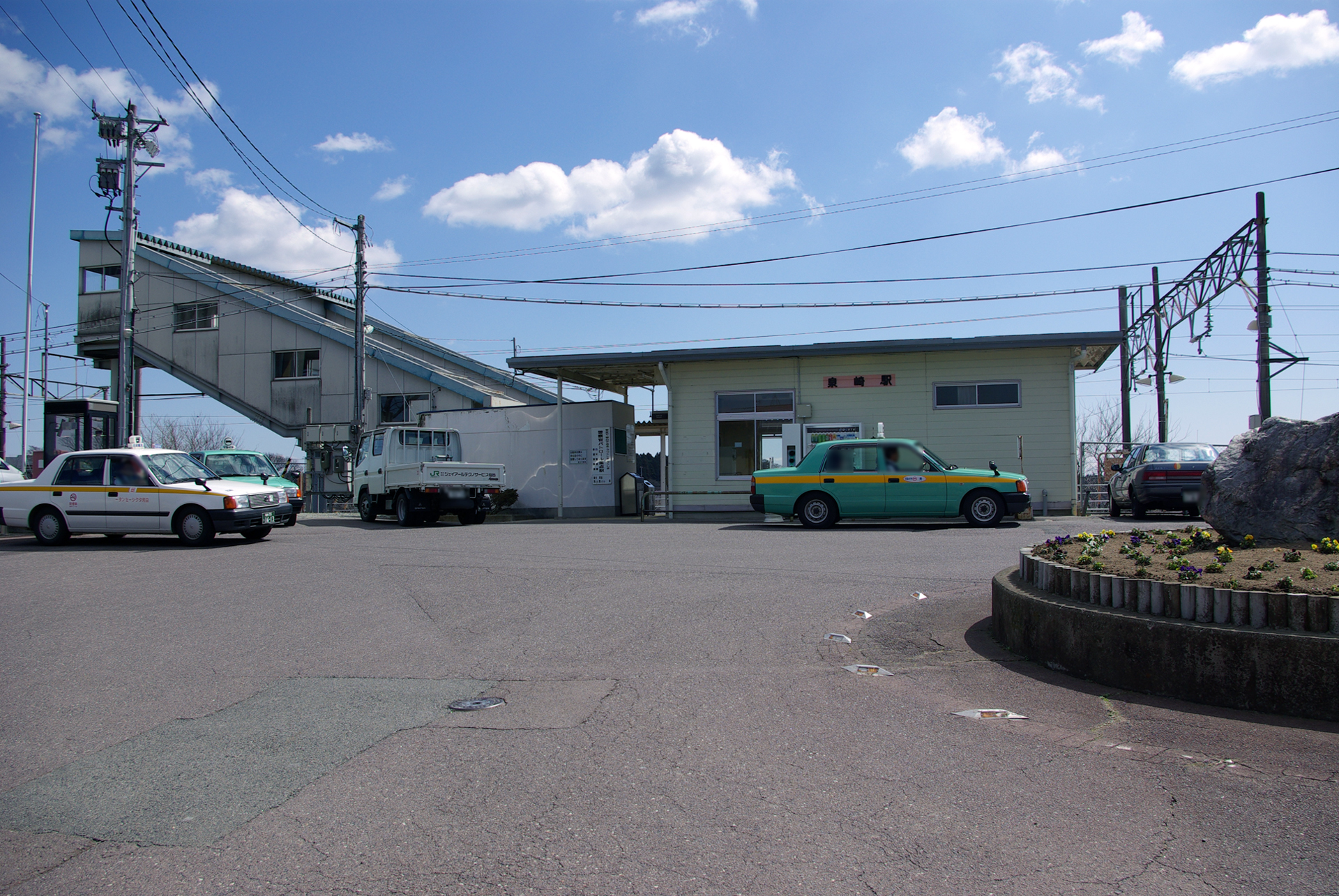
- Izumizaki Station in March 2009

General information
- Location: Izumizaki Date 20, Izumizaki-mura, Nishishirakawa-gun, Fukushima-ken 969-0101; Japan
- Coordinates: 37.1582°N 140.2991°E
- Operator: JR East
- Line: ■ Tōhoku Main Line
- Distance: 197.4 km from Tokyo
- Platforms: 2 side platforms
- Tracks: 2
- Connections: Bus stop

Other information
- Status: Unstaffed
- Website: Official website

History
- Opened: February 25, 1896

Passengers
- daily

Services
Preceding station	JR East	Following station
Kutano towards Kuroiso	Tōhoku Main Line Local	Yabuki towards Morioka
Location
- Location within Fukushima Prefecture Location within Japan

Izumizaki Station (泉崎駅, Izumizaki-eki) is a railway station on the Tōhoku Main Line in the village of Izumizaki, Fukushima Prefecture, Japan, operated by East Japan Railway Company (JR East).

== Lines ==
Izumizaki Station is served by the Tōhoku Main Line, located 197.4 rail kilometers from the official starting point of the line at Tokyo Station.

== Station layout ==
The station has two opposed side platforms connected to the station building by a footbridge. The station is unattended.

=== Platforms ===
1	■ Tōhoku Main Line	for Kōriyama
2	■ Tōhoku Main Line	for Shin-Shirakawa, and Kuroiso

== History ==
Izumizaki Station opened on February 25, 1896. The station was absorbed into the JR East network upon the privatization of the Japanese National Railways (JNR) on April 1, 1987.

== Surrounding area ==
- Izumizaki Village Hall
- Izumizaki Post Office
- Izumizaki Hospital

== See also ==
- List of railway stations in Japan
