= Omotegō, Fukushima =

Dissolved municipality in Fukushima prefecture, Japan

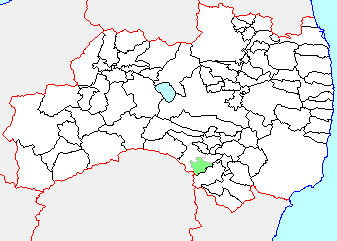
Map of Omotegō, Fukushima

Omotegō (表郷村, Omotegō-mura) was a village located in Nishishirakawa District, Fukushima Prefecture, Japan.

== Population ==
As of 2003, the village had an estimated population of 7,322 and a density of 110.14 persons per km^{2}. The total area was 66.48 km^{2}.

== Merging ==
On November 7, 2005, Omotegō, along with the villages of Higashi and Taishin (all from Nishishirakawa District) was merged into the expanded city of Shirakawa.
