= Shirakawa Station =

Railway station in Shirakawa, Fukushima Prefecture, Japan

Shirakawa Station 白河駅
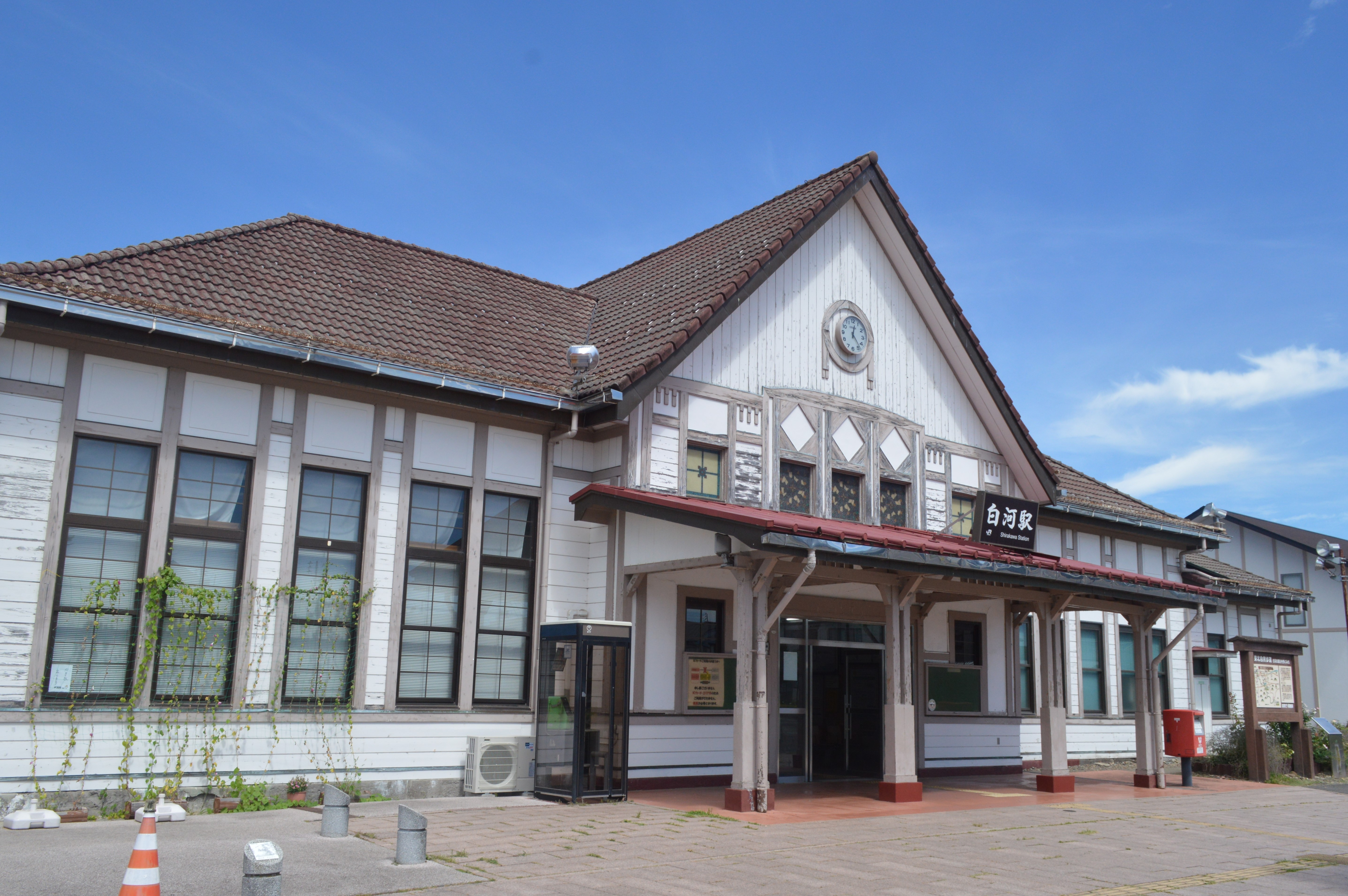
- Shirakawa Station in 2023

General information
- Location: Kakunai, Shirakawa-shi, Fukushima-ken 961-0074; Japan
- Coordinates: 37.1306°N 140.2130°E
- Operator: JR East
- Line: ■ Tōhoku Main Line
- Distance: 188.2 km from Tokyo
- Platforms: 1 island platform
- Tracks: 2
- Connections: Bus stop

Other information
- Status: Staffed ("Midori no Madoguchi")
- Website: Official website

History
- Opened: July 16, 1887

Passengers
- FY2018: 624 daily

Services
| Preceding station | JR East | Following station |
|---|---|---|
| Shin-Shirakawa towards Kuroiso | Tōhoku Main Line Local | Kutano towards Morioka |
Location
- Location within Fukushima Prefecture Location within Japan

Shirakawa Station (白河駅, Shirakawa-eki) is a railway station in the city of Shirakawa, Fukushima, Japan, operated by East Japan Railway Company (JR East).

== Lines ==
Shirakawa Station is served by the Tōhoku Main Line, and is located 188.2 rail kilometers from the official starting point of the line at Tokyo Station.

== Station layout ==
The station has one island platform connected to the station building by a footbridge. The station has a "Midori no Madoguchi" staffed ticket office.

=== Platforms ===
| 1 | ■ Tōhoku Main Line | for Shin-Shirakawa, Kuroiso, and Utsunomiya |
| 2 | ■ Tōhoku Main Line | for Fukushima and Kōriyama |

== History ==
Shirakawa Station opened on July 16, 1887. The Hakuhō Line connecting Shirakawa with Iwaki-Tanakura operated from this station from 1916-1944. The station was absorbed into the JR East network upon the privatization of the Japanese National Railways (JNR) on April 1, 1987.

== Passenger statistics ==
In fiscal 2018, the station was used by an average of 624 passengers daily (boarding passengers only).

== Surrounding area ==
- Shirakawa City Hall
- Shirakawa Post Office
- Shiroyama Park
- National Route 4
- National Route 289
- National Route 294

== See also ==
- List of railway stations in Japan
