= Kutano Station =

Railway station in Shirakawa, Fukushima Prefecture, Japan

Kutano Station 久田野駅
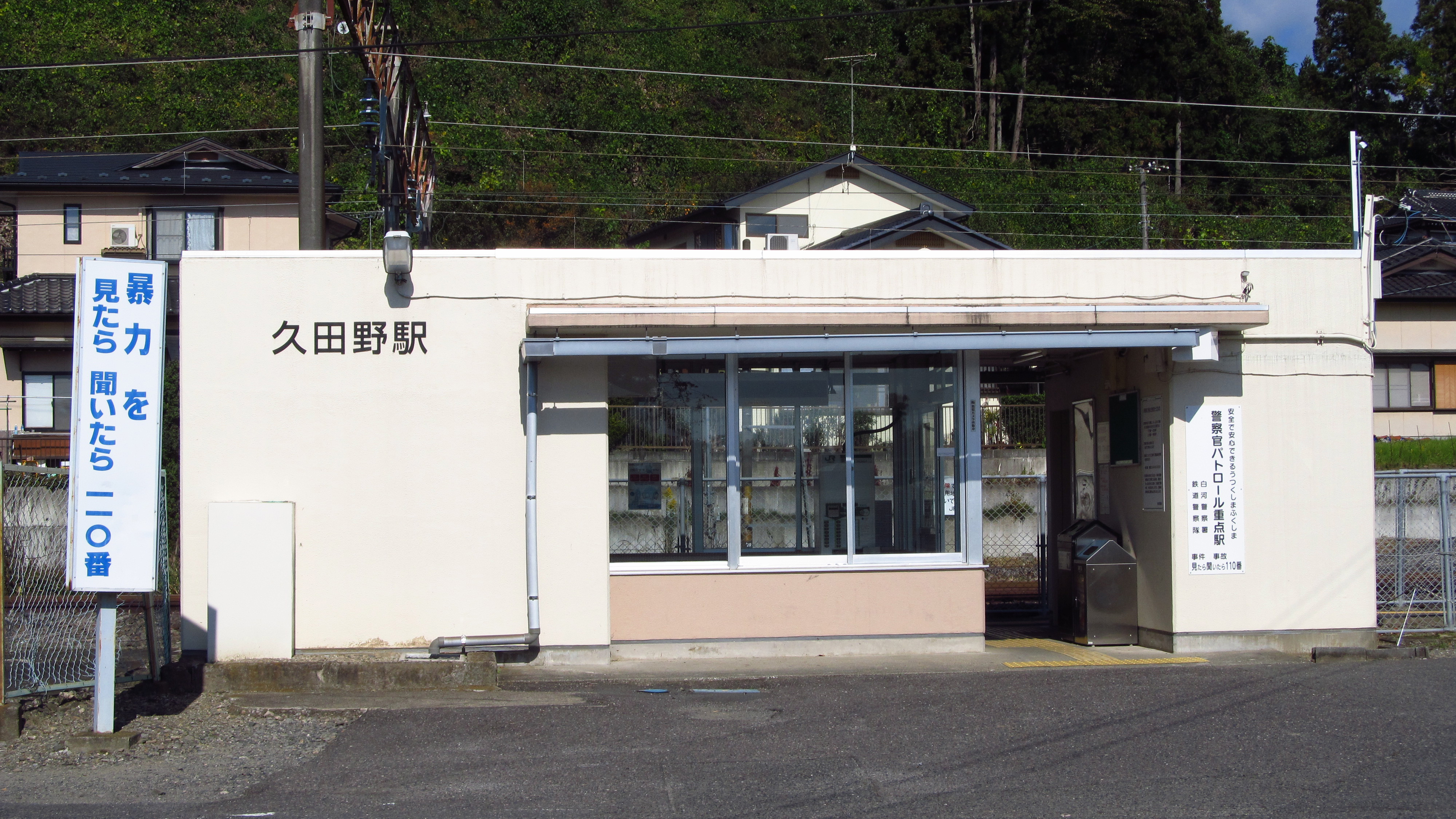
- Kutano Station in October 2015

General information
- Location: Kutano Tanaka 1, Shirakawa-shi, Fukushima-ken 961-0011; Japan
- Coordinates: 37.1373°N 140.2595°E
- Operator: JR East
- Line: ■ Tōhoku Main Line
- Distance: 192.9 km from Tokyo
- Platforms: 1 island platform
- Tracks: 2
- Connections: Bus stop

Other information
- Status: Unstaffed
- Website: Official website

History
- Opened: October 12, 1919

Passengers
- daily

Services
Preceding station	JR East	Following station
Shirakawa towards Kuroiso	Tōhoku Main Line Local	Izumizaki towards Morioka
Location
- Location within Fukushima Prefecture Location within Japan

Kutano Station (久田野駅, Kutano-eki) is a railway station in the city of Shirakawa, Fukushima Prefecture, Japan, operated by East Japan Railway Company (JR East).

== Lines ==
Kutano Station is served by the Tōhoku Main Line, and is located 192.9 rail kilometers from the official starting point of the line at Tokyo Station.

== Station layout ==
The station has one island platform connected to the station building by a footbridge. The station is unattended.

=== Platforms ===
1	■ Tōhoku Main Line	for Shin-Shirakawa, and Kuroiso
2	■ Tōhoku Main Line	for Kōriyama

== History ==
Kutano Station opened on October 12, 1919. The station was absorbed into the JR East network upon the privatization of the Japanese National Railways (JNR) on April 1, 1987.

== Surrounding area ==
- Kutano Post Office
- Takahashi River

== See also ==
- List of railway stations in Japan
