= Shirakawa, Fukushima =

City in Fukushima Prefecture, Japan

Shirakawa 白河市
- City
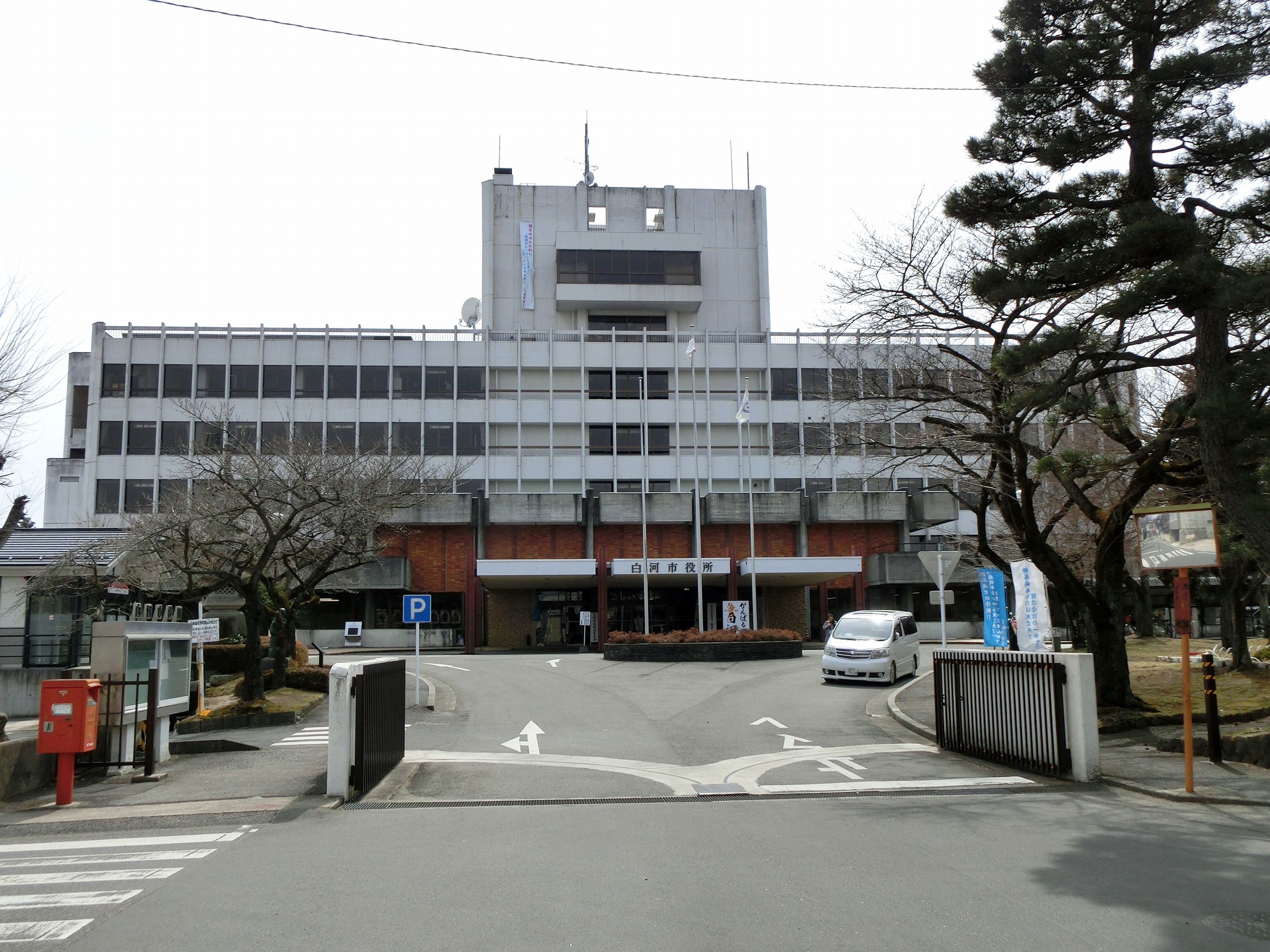
- Shirakawa City Hall

- Flag Seal

- Location of Shirakawa in Fukushima Prefecture

- Coordinates: 37°07′34.7″N 140°12′39.3″E
- Country: Japan
- Region: Tōhoku
- Prefecture: Fukushima
- First official recorded: 315 AD
- Town settled: April 1. 1889
- City settled: April 1, 1949

Government
  - Mayor: Kazuo Suzuki (from July 2007)

Area
  - Total: 305.32 km^{2} (117.88 sq mi)

Population (April 2020)
  - Total: 59,393
  - Density: 194.53/km^{2} (503.82/sq mi)
- Time zone: UTC+9 (Japan Standard Time)
- Phone number: 0248-22-1111
- Address: 7-1 Hachimankōji, Shirakawa, Fukushima 961-0941
- Climate: Cfa
- Website: Official website
- Symbols
- Bird: Emberiza cioides
- Flower: Ume
- Tree: Pinus densiflora

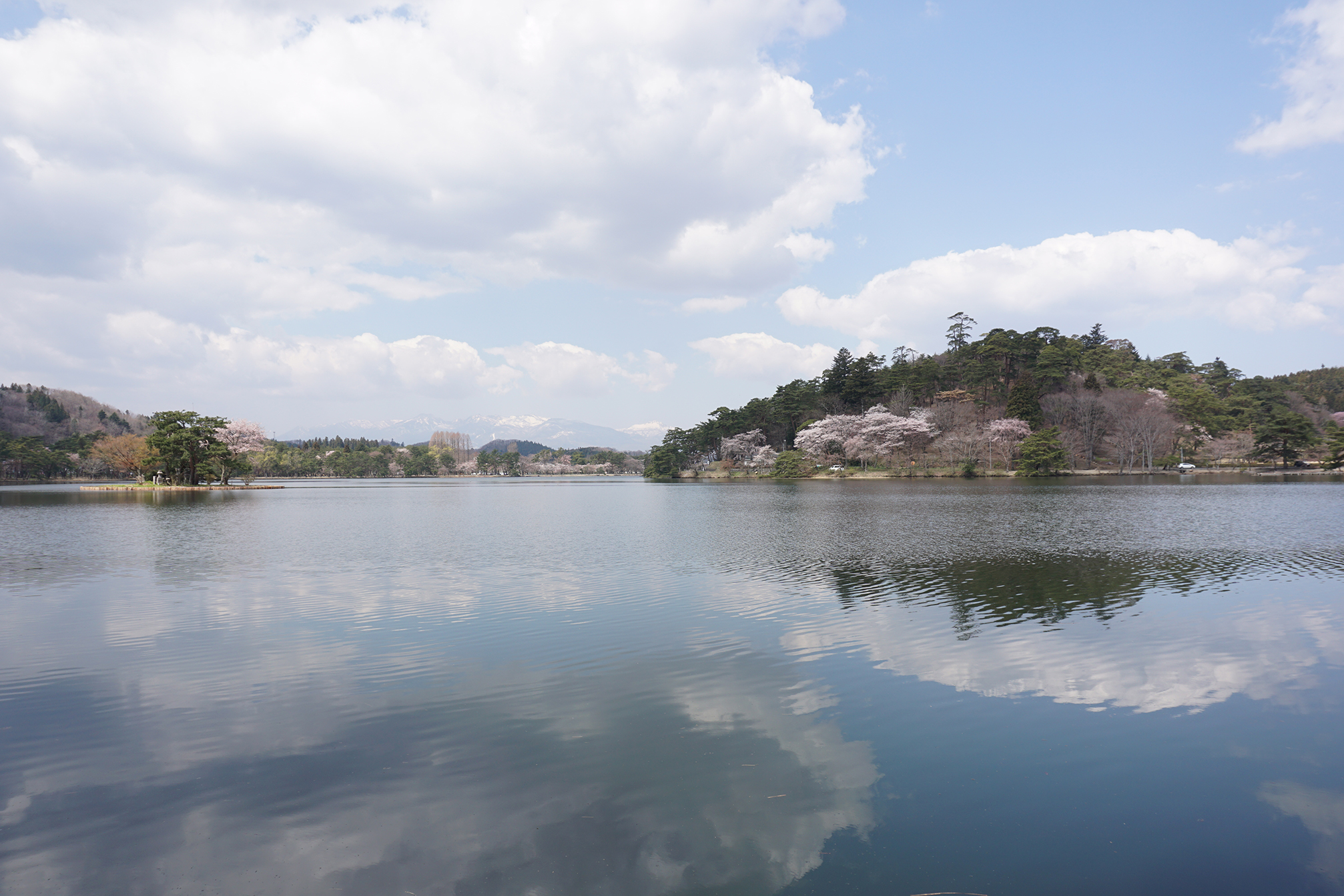
Nanko Park in Shirakawa

Shirakawa (白河市, Shirakawa-shi) is a city located in Fukushima Prefecture, Japan. As of 1 April 2020, the city had an estimated population of 59,393 in 23,546 households and a population density of 190 persons per km^{2}. The total area of the city was 305.3 square kilometres (117.9 sq mi).

== Geography ==
Shirakawa is located in south-central Fukushima prefecture facing the Nasu plateau, and extending to the lowland Shirakawa Basin.

- Rivers: Abukuma River

=== Neighboring municipalities ===
- Fukushima Prefecture
  - Asakawa
  - Ishikawa
  - Izumizaki
  - Nakajima
  - Nishigō
  - Tanagura
  - Ten'ei
  - Yabuki
- Tochigi Prefecture
  - Nasu

=== Climate ===
Shirakawa has a humid subtropical climate (Köppen Cfa) characterized by mild summers and cold winters. The average annual temperature in Shirakawa is 11.4 °C. The average annual rainfall is 1377 mm with September as the wettest month. The temperatures are highest on average in August, at around 25.0 °C, and lowest in January, at around 0.3 °C.

Climate data for Shirakawa (1991–2020 normals, extremes 1940–present)
Month	Jan	Feb	Mar	Apr	May	Jun	Jul	Aug	Sep	Oct	Nov	Dec	Year
Record high °C (°F)	17.1 (62.8)	19.9 (67.8)	23.5 (74.3)	28.9 (84.0)	32.9 (91.2)	34.1 (93.4)	36.0 (96.8)	35.9 (96.6)	34.7 (94.5)	28.7 (83.7)	23.3 (73.9)	20.7 (69.3)	36.0 (96.8)
Mean maximum °C (°F)	11.6 (52.9)	14.3 (57.7)	18.3 (64.9)	24.4 (75.9)	28.5 (83.3)	30.2 (86.4)	33.4 (92.1)	33.7 (92.7)	30.5 (86.9)	25.5 (77.9)	19.6 (67.3)	14.5 (58.1)	34.3 (93.7)
Mean daily maximum °C (°F)	5.0 (41.0)	6.0 (42.8)	9.8 (49.6)	15.9 (60.6)	21.1 (70.0)	24.0 (75.2)	27.4 (81.3)	28.7 (83.7)	24.5 (76.1)	18.9 (66.0)	13.3 (55.9)	7.8 (46.0)	16.9 (62.4)
Daily mean °C (°F)	0.6 (33.1)	1.2 (34.2)	4.5 (40.1)	10.2 (50.4)	15.5 (59.9)	19.1 (66.4)	22.8 (73.0)	23.7 (74.7)	19.8 (67.6)	14.0 (57.2)	8.1 (46.6)	3.1 (37.6)	11.9 (53.4)
Mean daily minimum °C (°F)	−3.3 (26.1)	−3.0 (26.6)	−0.3 (31.5)	4.7 (40.5)	10.3 (50.5)	15.0 (59.0)	19.3 (66.7)	20.2 (68.4)	16.2 (61.2)	9.9 (49.8)	3.4 (38.1)	−1.0 (30.2)	7.6 (45.7)
Mean minimum °C (°F)	−7.8 (18.0)	−7.6 (18.3)	−5.4 (22.3)	−1.6 (29.1)	3.8 (38.8)	9.1 (48.4)	15.0 (59.0)	15.6 (60.1)	9.4 (48.9)	3.0 (37.4)	−2.4 (27.7)	−5.7 (21.7)	−8.5 (16.7)
Record low °C (°F)	−13.4 (7.9)	−13.6 (7.5)	−12.3 (9.9)	−6.0 (21.2)	−2.3 (27.9)	5.1 (41.2)	7.2 (45.0)	11.1 (52.0)	3.9 (39.0)	−2.5 (27.5)	−6.8 (19.8)	−12.4 (9.7)	−13.6 (7.5)
Average precipitation mm (inches)	44.1 (1.74)	34.8 (1.37)	78.9 (3.11)	101.7 (4.00)	122.6 (4.83)	149.8 (5.90)	233.2 (9.18)	206.0 (8.11)	211.4 (8.32)	166.3 (6.55)	66.3 (2.61)	41.7 (1.64)	1,456.7 (57.35)
Average snowfall cm (inches)	36 (14)	25 (9.8)	14 (5.5)	2 (0.8)	0 (0)	0 (0)	0 (0)	0 (0)	0 (0)	0 (0)	1 (0.4)	12 (4.7)	90 (35)
Average precipitation days (≥ 0.5 mm)	6.8	6.3	10.0	10.7	12.0	15.0	17.4	14.9	13.6	11.1	7.5	7.1	132.4
Average snowy days	22.7	17.9	14.2	2.8	0.0	0.0	0.0	0.0	0.0	0.0	4.1	15.9	77.8
Average relative humidity (%)	67	64	63	64	69	78	83	82	82	78	74	70	73
Mean monthly sunshine hours	151.4	156.1	179.9	182.8	182.0	130.5	120.9	142.1	119.3	134.0	145.7	146.8	1,790.7
Source: Japan Meteorological Agency (1991–2020 normals, extremes 1940–present)

== Demographics ==
Per Japanese census data, the population of Shirakawa peaked around the year 2000 and has declined since.

Historical population
Year	Pop.	±%
1950	65,543	—
1960	62,480	−4.7%
1970	58,896	−5.7%
1980	60,253	+2.3%
1990	63,839	+6.0%
2000	66,048	+3.5%
2010	64,704	−2.0%
2020	59,491	−8.1%

Comparison of Population Distribution between Shirakawa and Japanese National Average
Population Distribution by Age and Sex in Shirakawa
■ Shirakawa
■ Japan (average)
■ Male
■ Female

1970	58,896
1975	59,821
1980	60,253
1985	62,596
1990	63,839
1995	65,155
2000	66,048
2005	65,707
2010	64,710

2015 Census, Ministry of Internal Affairs and Communications - Statistics Department

== History ==
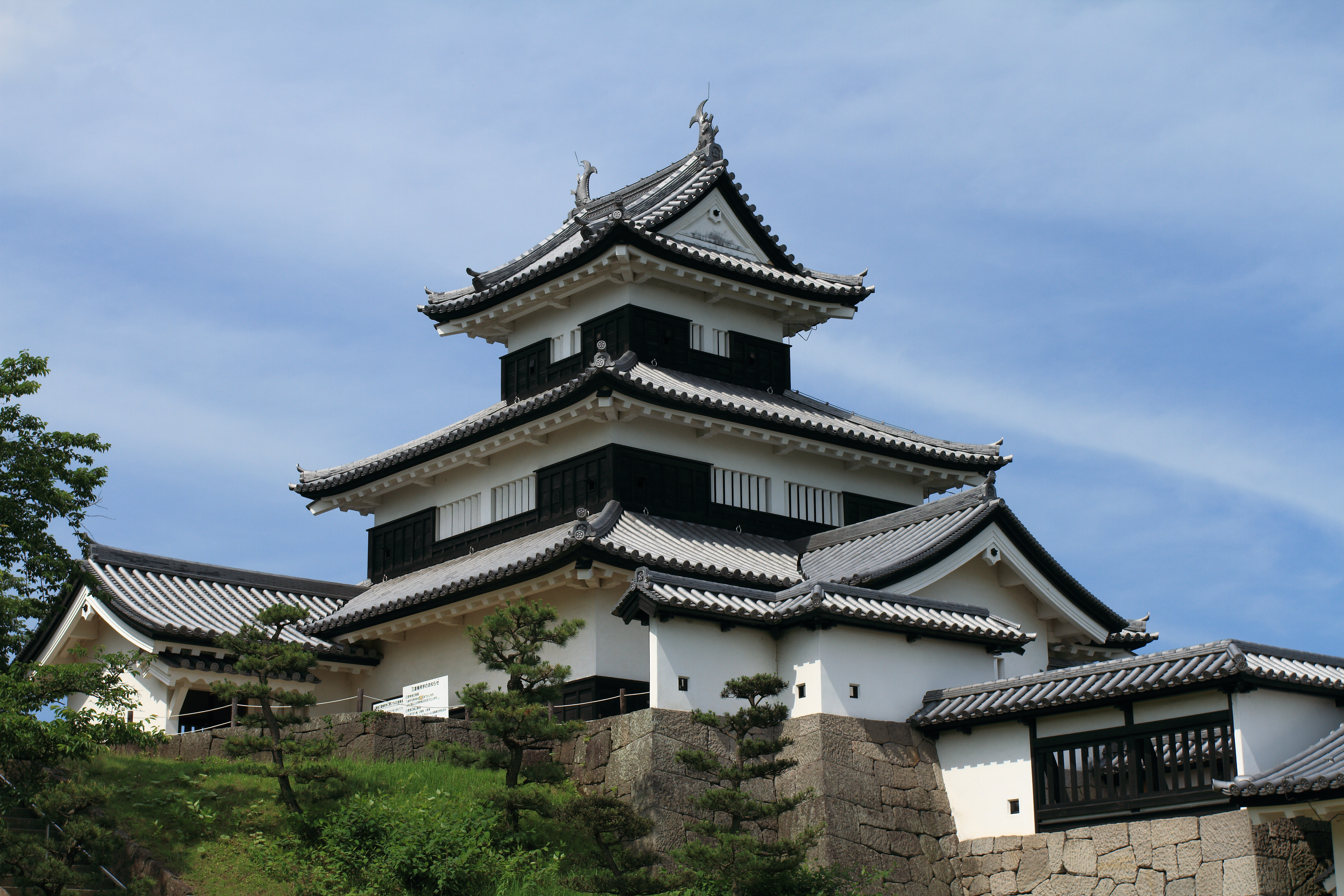
View of Komine Castle in Shirakawa

The area of present-day Shirakawa was part of ancient Mutsu Province and was the location of a barrier gate on the Ōshū Kaidō connecting the capital at Kyoto with the northern provinces. In the Heian period, the Buddhist monk and waka poet Nōin composed the following poem about the region:

都をば霞とともに立ちしかど秋風ぞ吹く白河の関

Miyako wo ba kasumi to tomo ni tachishikado akikaze zo fuku Shirakawa no seki.

(English: I left the capital with the spring haze, but at the barrier of Shirakawa the autumn wind blows.)

In the Edo period the area prospered as the castle town of the Shirakawa Domain and was the site of a major battle in the Boshin War during the Meiji restoration. In the Meiji period, it was organized as part of the Nakadōri region of Iwaki Province.

The town of Shirakawa was formed on April 1, 1889 with the creation of the modern municipalities system. On April 1, 1949, Shirakawa was elevated to city status after merging with the neighboring village of Ōnuma. Subsequent mergers occurred in 1954 and 1955 with the inclusion of the villages of Shirasaka, Odagawa, Goka and a portion of Omotegō into the territory of Shirakawa. On November 7, 2005, the villages of Taishin, Higashi, and the remainder of Omotegō (all from Nishishirakawa District) were merged into Shirakawa, increasing its population from 48,297 to approximately 66,000 and territory from 117.67 km^{2} (45.43 sq mi) to 305.30 km^{2} (117.88 sq mi).

== Government ==
Shirakawa has a mayor-council form of government with a directly elected mayor and a unicameral city legislature of 26 members. Shirakawa, together with Nishishirakawa District contributes three members to the Fukushima Prefectural Assembly. In terms of national politics, the city is part of Fukushima 3rd district of the lower house of the Diet of Japan.

== Economy ==
Shirakawa has a mixed economy, and is a major commercial center for the surrounding region. Principal industries include electrical appliances, construction materials and clothing. The D+M Group has a plant where Marantz and Denon high fidelity components are produced.

== Education ==
Shirakawa has fifteen public elementary schools and eight junior high schools operated by the city government and four public high schools operated by the Fukushima Prefectural Board of Education.

== Post offices ==
Shirakawa has nineteen post offices within the boundaries of the city.

== Transportation ==
=== Railway ===
- JR East - Tōhoku Main Line
  - Shirasaka – (Shin-Shirakawa) – Shirakawa - Kutano

=== Highway ===
- Tōhoku Expressway – Shirakawa-chūō Interchange – Abukuma Parking Area
- National Route 4
- National Route 289
- National Route 294

== Local attractions ==
- Site of Shirakawa Barrier - National Historic Site
- Komine Castle – One of the 100 Castles of Japan
- Nanko Park – National Historic Site and National Scenic Site
- Shirakawa Funada-Motonuma Sites – kofun period burial tumulus, National Historic Site
- Yūki-Shirakawa Castle, National Historic Site
- Festivals held in Shirakawa include "Daruma Ichi", celebrating the traditional Daruma doll, wherein the city streets are packed with stalls selling Daruma, a variety of festival foods and charms, and "Chōchin Matsuri" (Lantern Festival), which is held each summer, with a special three-day celebration held once every three years.

== International relations ==
- Compiègne, France, since October 20, 1988
- Anoka, Minnesota, United States, since October 13, 2002

== Noted people from Shirakawa ==
- Atsushi Fujita, Olympic marathon runner
- Toshiaki Fushimi, Olympic cyclist
- Koji Igarashi, longtime Castlevania series producer and creator of Bloodstained: Ritual of the Night
- Hideo Madarame, Olympic cyclist
- Gishu Nakayama, writer
