= Higashi, Fukushima =

Dissolved municipality in Fukushima prefecture, Japan

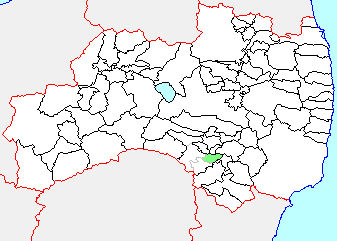
Map of Higashi, Fukushima

Higashi (東村, Higashi-mura) was a village located in Nishishirakawa District, Fukushima Prefecture, Japan.

On November 7, 2005, Higashi, along with the villages of Omotegō and Taishin (all from Nishishirakawa District) was merged into the expanded city of Shirakawa.

As of 2003, the village had an estimated population of 6,021 and a density of 149.11 persons per km^{2}. The total area was 40.38 km^{2}.
