= Shin-Shirakawa Station =

Railway station in Nishigō, Fukushima Prefecture, Japan

Shin-Shirakawa Station 新白河駅
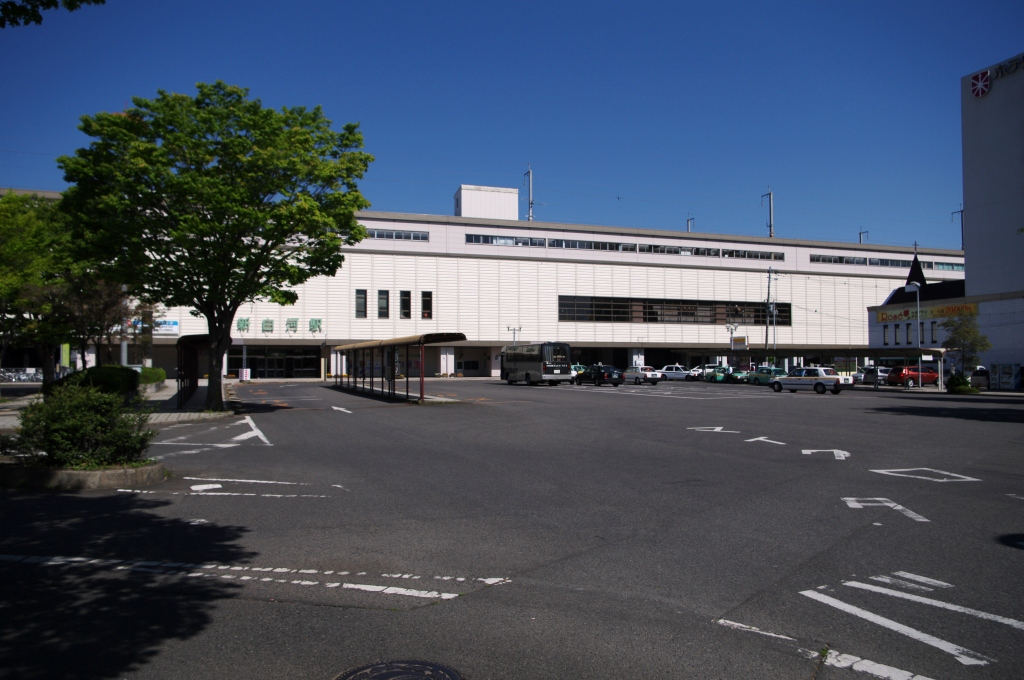
- The station exterior in May 2011

General information
- Location: Nishigō-mura, Nishishirakawa-gun, Fukushima-ken 961-8055; Japan
- Coordinates: 37.123199°N 140.188766°E
- Operator: JR East
- Lines: Tōhoku Shinkansen; Tōhoku Main Line
- Platforms: 3 side + 1 island platforms
- Tracks: 5
- Connections: Bus stop

Other information
- Status: Staffed (Midori no Madoguchi)
- Website: Official website

History
- Opened: 7 April 1959; 67 years ago
- Former names: Iwaki-Nishigō (until 1982)

Passengers
- FY2016: 2,999 daily

Services
Preceding station	JR East	Following station
Nasu-Shiobara towards Tokyo	Tōhoku Shinkansen Yamabiko	Kōriyama towards Morioka
Nasu-Shiobara towards Tokyo	Tōhoku Shinkansen Nasuno	Kōriyama Terminus
Shirasaka towards Kuroiso	Tōhoku Main Line Local	Shirakawa towards Morioka
Location
- Location within Fukushima Prefecture Location within Japan

Shin-Shirakawa Station (新白河駅) is a railway station in the village of Nishigō, Fukushima, Japan, operated by East Japan Railway Company (JR East).

== Lines ==
The station is served by the Tōhoku Shinkansen high-speed line and the Tōhoku Main Line, and is 185.4 km from the starting point the Tōhoku Main Line at Tokyo Station.

== Station layout ==
The shinkansen section consists of two opposed side platforms serving two tracks, with two centre tracks for non-stop passing trains. The Tōhoku Main Line section of the station consists of one side platform and one island platform, serving three tracks.

The station has a Midori no Madoguchi staffed ticket office.

=== Platforms ===
1	■ Tōhoku Shinkansen	for Ōmiya, Ueno, and Tokyo
4	■ Tōhoku Shinkansen	for Sendai and Morioka
5	■ Tōhoku Main Line	for Kuroiso and Utsunomiya
6	■ Tōhoku Main Line	for Kuroiso and Utsunomiya
6	■ Tōhoku Main Line	for Shirakawa and Kōriyama
7	■ Tōhoku Main Line	for Shirakawa and Kōriyama

== History ==
The station first opened as Iwaki-Nishigō Station (磐城西郷駅) on 7 April 1959. On 23 June 1982, it was renamed Shin-Shirakawa Station, coinciding with the opening of the Tōhoku Shinkansen. The station was absorbed into the JR East network upon the privatization of the Japanese National Railways (JNR) on 1 April 1987.

== Passenger statistics ==
In fiscal 2016, the station was used by an average of 2,999 passengers daily (boarding passengers only). The passenger figures for previous years are as shown below.

Fiscal year	Daily average
2000	2,824
2005	2,799
2010	2,724
2011	2,504

== Surrounding area ==
- National Route 4
- National Route 294
- JR East Research Centre

== Bus routes ==
=== Shin-Shirakawa ===
Track 1

- JR BUS KANTO Hakuhō Line
  - Shirakawa Station
- Community buses
  - Shirakawa Station via Nanko Park
    - Runs on only weekdays and Saturdays.

Track 2

- JR BUS KANTO Hakuhō Line
  - Shin-Shirakawa Station - Nanko Park - Iwaki-Tanakura Station - Sobo'oka

Track 3

- Fukushima Transportation
  - Shin-Shirakawa Station - Shirakawa Station - Iwaki-Ishikawa Station - Ishikawa Office
  - Shin-Shirakawa Station - Shirakawa Station - Shirasaka Station
  - Shin-Shirakawa Station - Shirakawa no Seki - Sekinomori Park
- Limited express bus (operated by Fukushima Transportation and Aizu Bus)
  - Shin-Shirakawa Station - Shimogo Village Hall - Ouchijuku - Tō-no-Hetsuri Station - Yunokamionsen Station - Ashinomakionsen Station - Tsuruga Castle - Aizu-Wakamatsu Station
    - Runs on only holidays during summer.

Track 4

- Night bus operated by Sakura Kotsu
  - Bound for Shinjuku Station

=== Shin-Shirakawa Kogenguchi Bus stop ===
- Fukushima Transportation
  - Shobusawa
  - Circular-route bus for Nishigo
  - Shimo-Shibahara via Haranaka
  - Kawatani via Haranaka
  - Tsunago via Haranaka
  - Manako
  - Yuigahara via Oppara
  - Kogen Hotel
- Reservation bus
  - British Hills
