= Nanko Park =

Park in Shirakawa, Fukushima, Japan

- 南湖公園
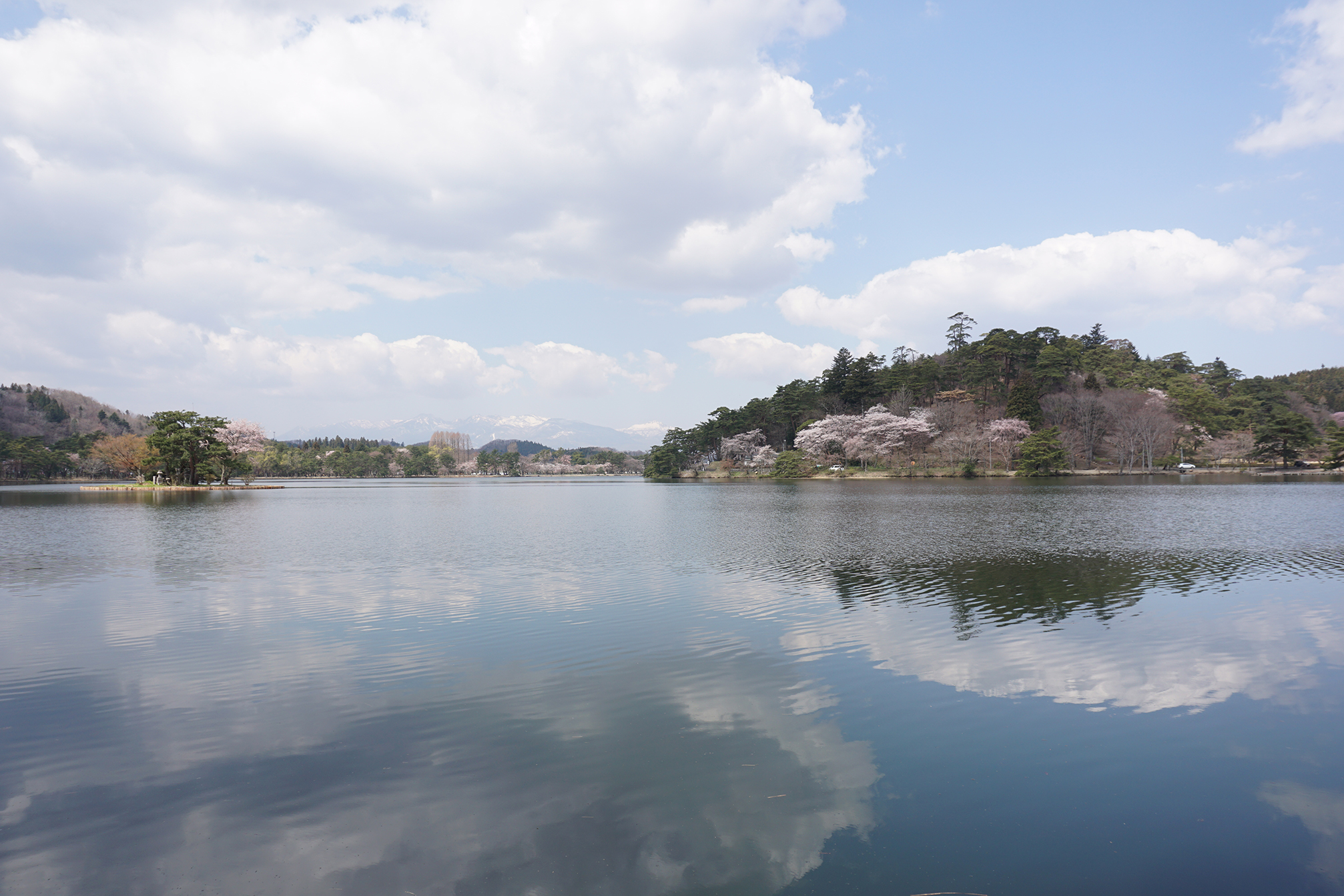
- Nanko kōen

- Location within Fukushima Prefecture Location within Japan
- Type: Japanese garden
- Location: Shirakawa, Fukushima, Japan
- Coordinates: 37°06′37″N 140°12′57″E
- Created: 1801
- National Historic Site of Japan National Place of Scenic Beauty

Nanko Park (南湖公園, Nanko kōen) is considered to be the oldest public park in Japan, having been founded in 1801 by Matsudaira Sadanobu, the 12th daimyō of Shirakawa Domain. It was designated as both a National Historic Site of Japan and as a National Place of Scenic Beauty in 1934.

== Overview ==
Matsudaira Sadanobu (松平 定信; January 15, 1759 – June 14, 1829) was a Japanese daimyō of the mid-Edo period, famous for his financial reforms which saved the Shirakawa Domain, and the similar reforms he undertook during his tenure as chief senior councilor (老中首座, rōjū shuza) of the Tokugawa shogunate, from 1787 to 1793. He was also noted as a strong follower of the teaching of the Neo-Confucianism of Zhu Xi.

In 1801 Matsudaira Sadanobu built an embankment in a wetland to create a reservoir, around which he planted a garden on a vast scale. The perimeter of the walking path around the lake is over two kilometers. He elected 17 scenic spots around the lake and erected a monument engraved with Classical Chinese poems and Japanese waka poems. Most unusually, he opened the park to common people, regardless of their social status. He also built a tea room called "Kyorakutei" which could be enjoyed by the common people. He named the reservoir "South Lake" after the poem by the Tang dynasty poet Li Bai about Dongting Lake in Hunan Province, and also because the lake was located south of Komine Castle.

== See also ==
- List of Historic Sites of Japan (Fukushima)
- List of Places of Scenic Beauty of Japan (Fukushima)
