= Iwaki-Ishikawa Station =

Railway station in Ishikawa, Fukushima Prefecture, Japan

Iwaki-Ishikawa Station 磐城石川駅
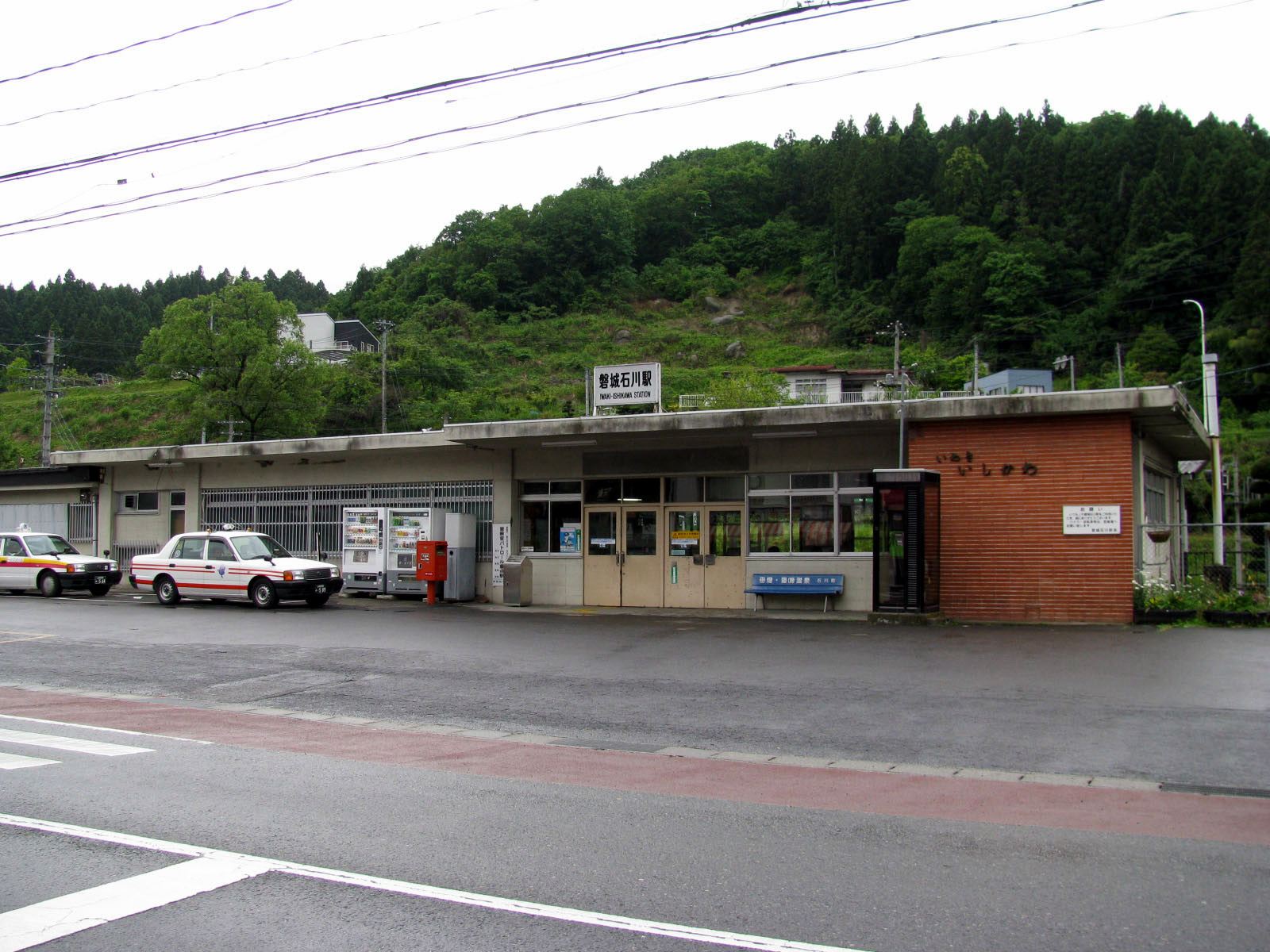
- Iwaki-Ishikawa Station in May 2008

General information
- Location: Tomachi 223, Ishikawa-machi, Ishikawa-gun, Fukushima-ken 963-7857; Japan
- Coordinates: 37.1413°N 140.4444°E
- Operator: JR East
- Line: ■ Suigun Line
- Distance: 105.3 km from Mito
- Platforms: 1 side +1 island platform
- Tracks: 3

Other information
- Status: Staffed
- Website: Official website

History
- Opened: December 4, 1934

Passengers
- FY2016: 543 daily

Services
Preceding station	JR East	Following station
Satoshiraishi towards Mito	Suigun Line	Nogisawa towards Kōriyama
Location
- Location within Fukushima Prefecture Location within Japan

Iwaki-Ishikawa Station (磐城石川駅, Iwaki-Ishikawa-eki) is a railway station in the town of Ishikawa, Fukushima, Japan operated by East Japan Railway Company (JR East).

== Lines ==
Iwaki-Ishikawa Station is served by the Suigun Line, and is located 105.3 rail kilometers from the official starting point of the line at Mito.

== Station layout ==
The station has a single side platform and an island platform connected to the station building by a level crossing. The station has a Midori no Madoguchi staffed ticket office.

=== Platforms ===
1	■ Suigun Line	for Mito
2	■ Suigun Line	for some starting trains to Kōriyama
3	■ Suigun Line	for Kōriyama

== History ==
Iwaki-Ishikawa Station opened on December 4, 1934. The station was absorbed into the JR East network upon the privatization of the Japanese National Railways (JNR) on April 1, 1987.

== Passenger statistics ==
In fiscal 2018, the station was used by an average of 518 passengers daily (boarding passengers only).

== Surrounding area ==
- Ishikawa Town Hall
- Ishikawa Post Office
- Nekonaki Onsen
- Katakura Onsen
- Bohata Onsen
- National Route 118

== See also ==
- List of railway stations in Japan
