= Japan National Route 289 =

National highway in Japan

Coordinates: 37°24′23.36″N 139°14′8.05″E

National Route 289
- 国道289号
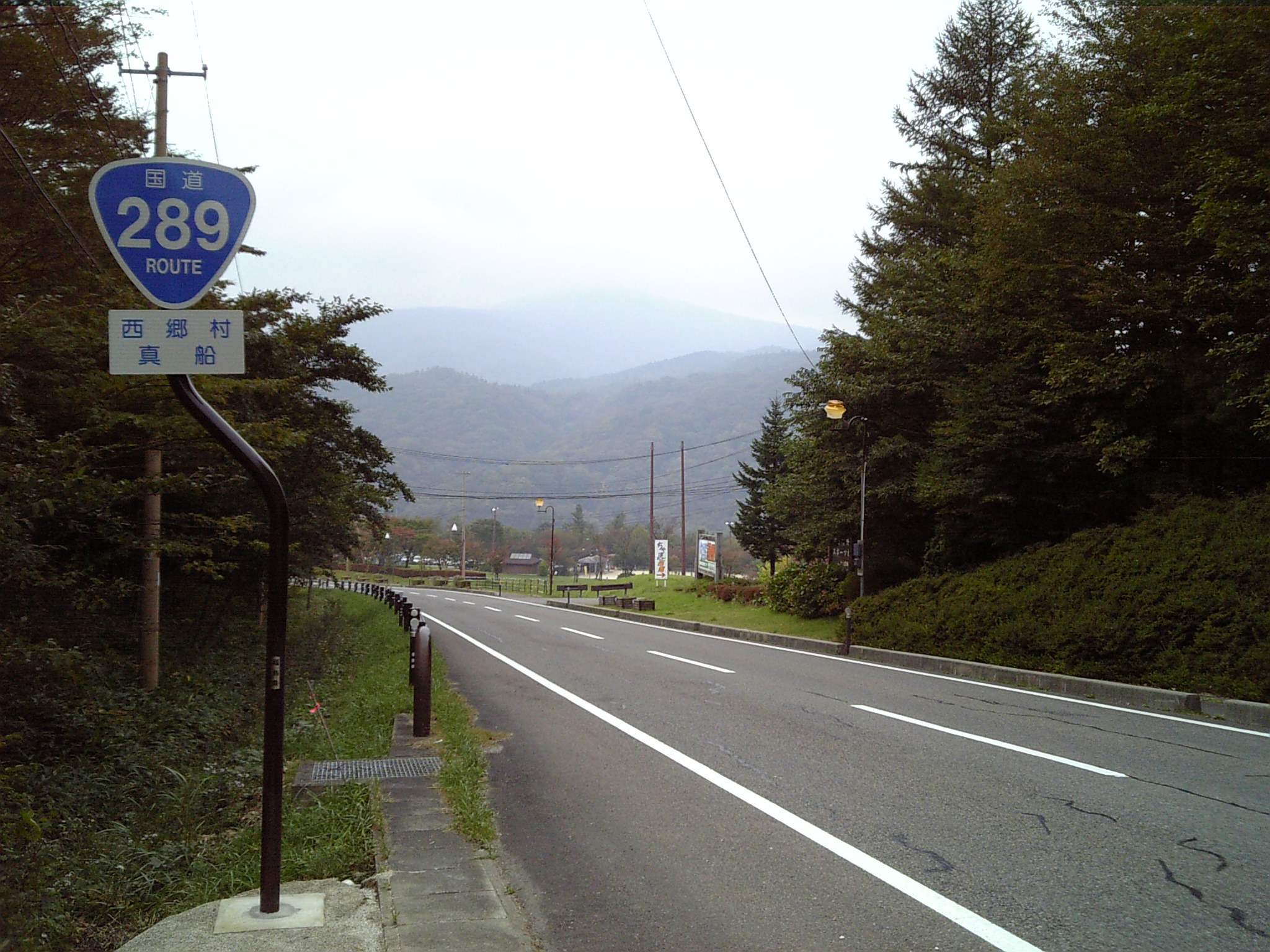
- Eastern part of the 289 near Nishigō, Fukushima

Route information
- Length: 275.4 km (171.1 mi)
- Existed: 1999–present

Major junctions
- West end: Yoshida, Niigata
- Central section incomplete
- East end: Iwaki, Fukushima

Location
- Country: Japan

Highway system
- National highways of Japan; Expressways of Japan
← National Route 288	→ National Route 290

National Route 289 is an incomplete national highway in Japan that will eventually connect central Niigata with Iwaki, Fukushima with a total length of 275.4 km (171.1 mi).

At present, work is underway to complete an 18 km (11 mi) central section that will join the eastern and western portions together through the very northern part of the Japanese Alps on Niigata's and Fukushima's prefectural border.

When finished, traffic will be able to travel coast to coast across Japan in a link between the Sea of Japan and Pacific.

== Sections ==
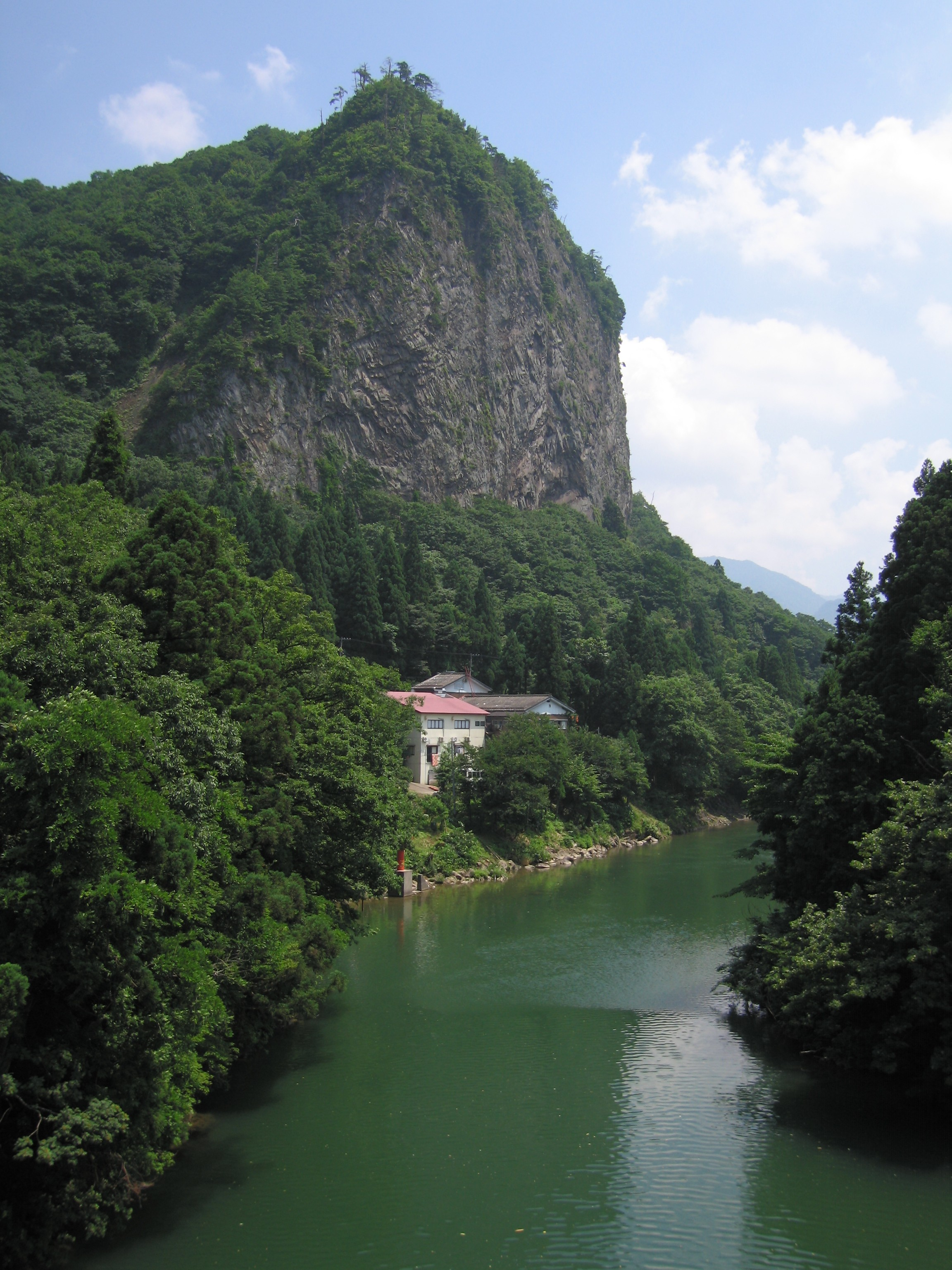
View from Route 289 outside Shitada village, eastern Niigata

=== Niigata ===
The western part of Route 289 begins in Yoshida passing east through the towns of Tsubame and Sanjo. It currently ends in the mountains 10 km south east of Shitada village.

=== Fukushima ===
The eastern part of Route 289 starts in Iwaki, Fukushima near Nakoso Station. It then heads west through Shirakawa and passed Shinshirakawa. It currently ends 12 km north west of Nishigō village.

=== Central part ===
Work to join the east and west sections began in 1999. But the scheme suffered a major setback after the Chūetsu earthquake in 2004 when landslips covered large parts of the route. In 2005/06 efforts were made to clear these blockages and restart building work.

The finished route, which presently is a dirt track and is only passable by 4x4s or construction traffic, will include several spanned bridges, avalanche covers and a 1.5 km tunnel.

A provisional completion date was given as 2012 but that has since lapsed.
