= Fukushima Prefecture =

Prefecture of Japan

Coordinates: 37°24′N 140°28′E

Fukushima Prefecture 福島県
- Prefecture

Japanese transcription(s)
  - Japanese: 福島県
  - Rōmaji: Fukushima-ken
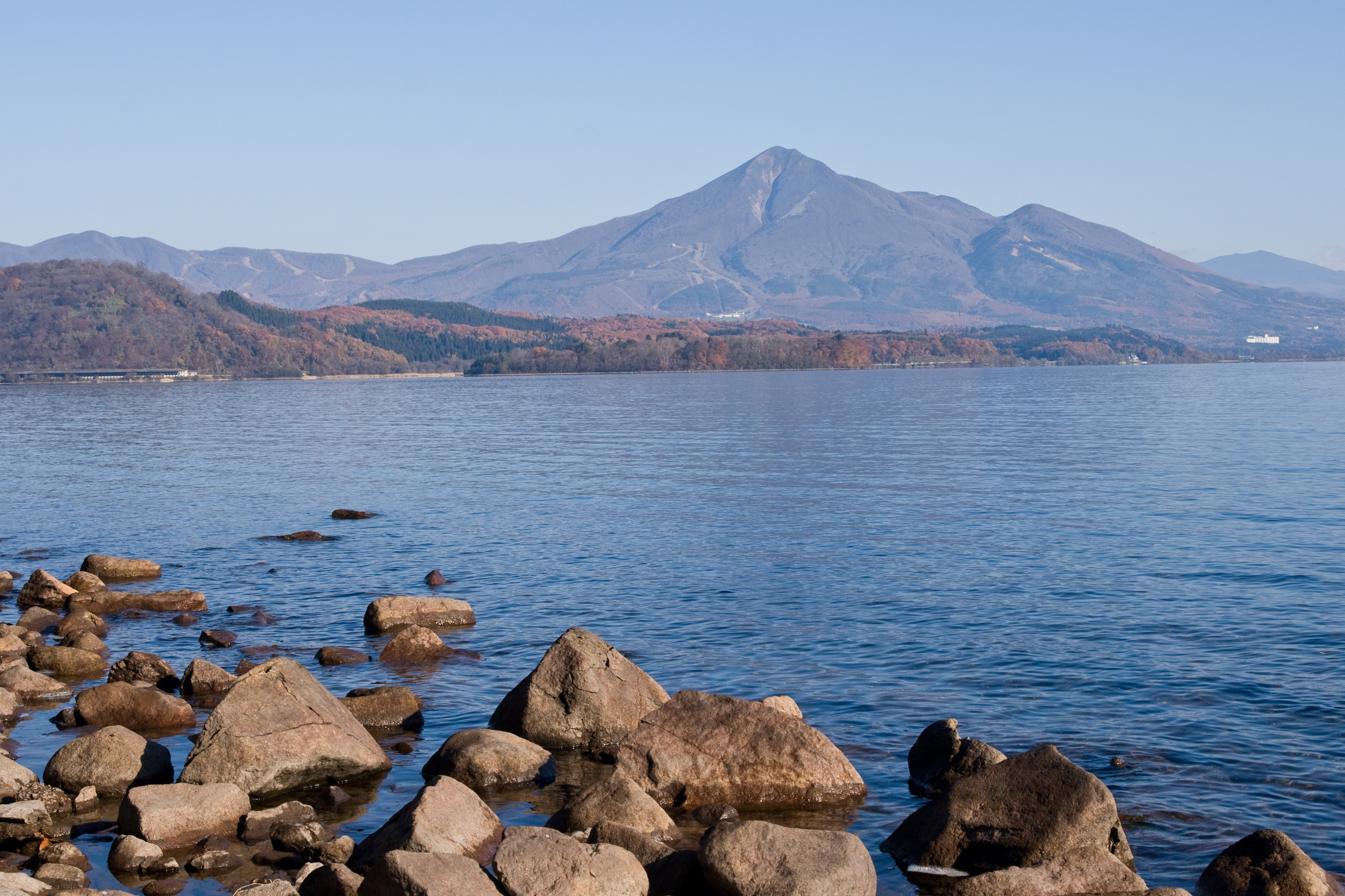
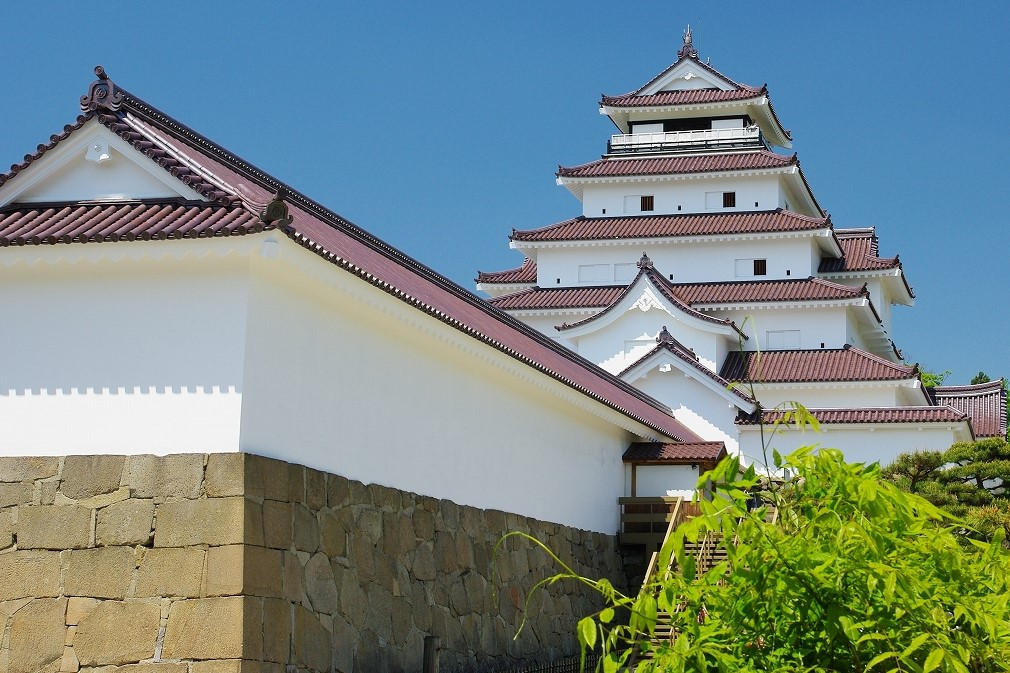
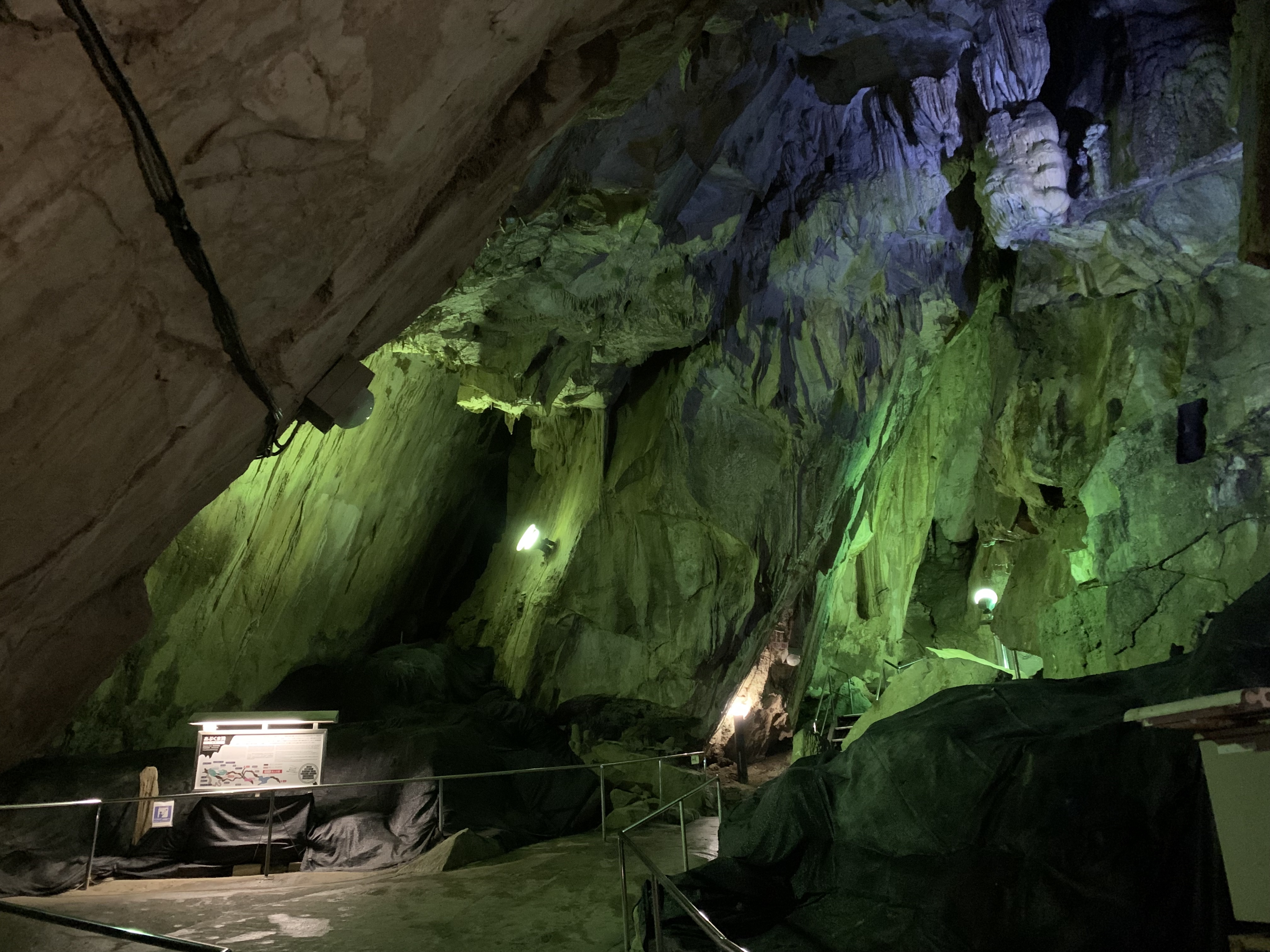
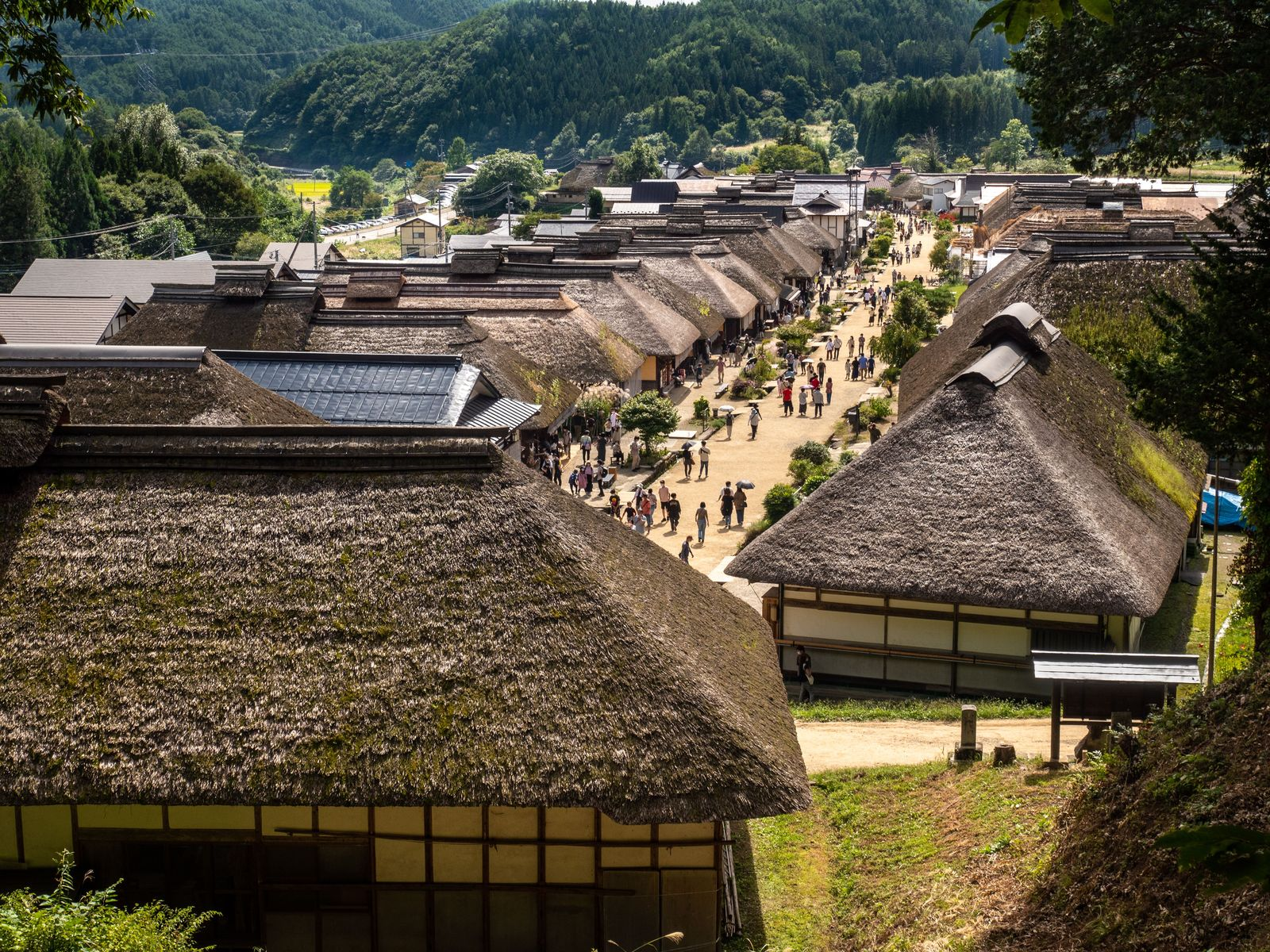
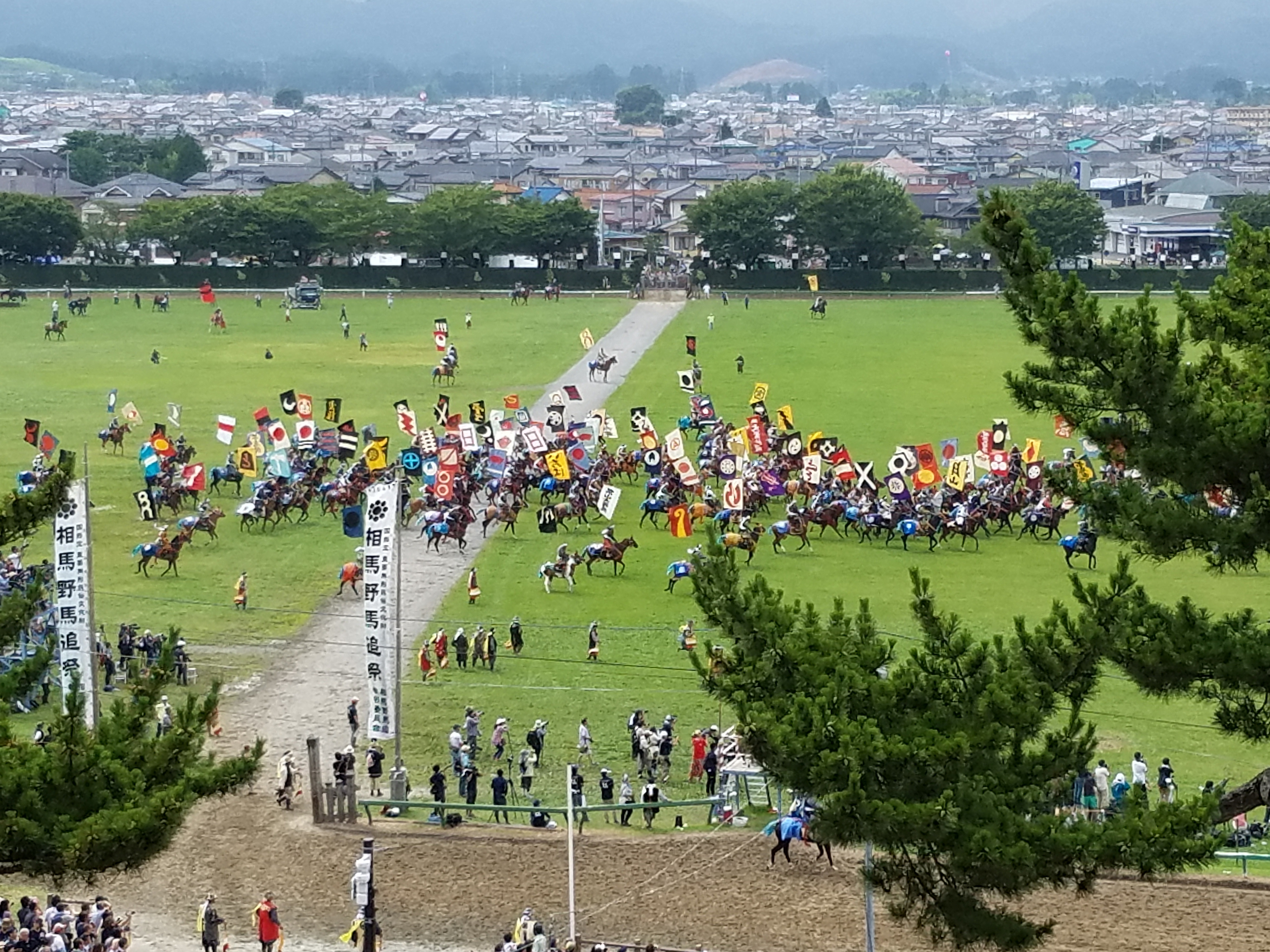
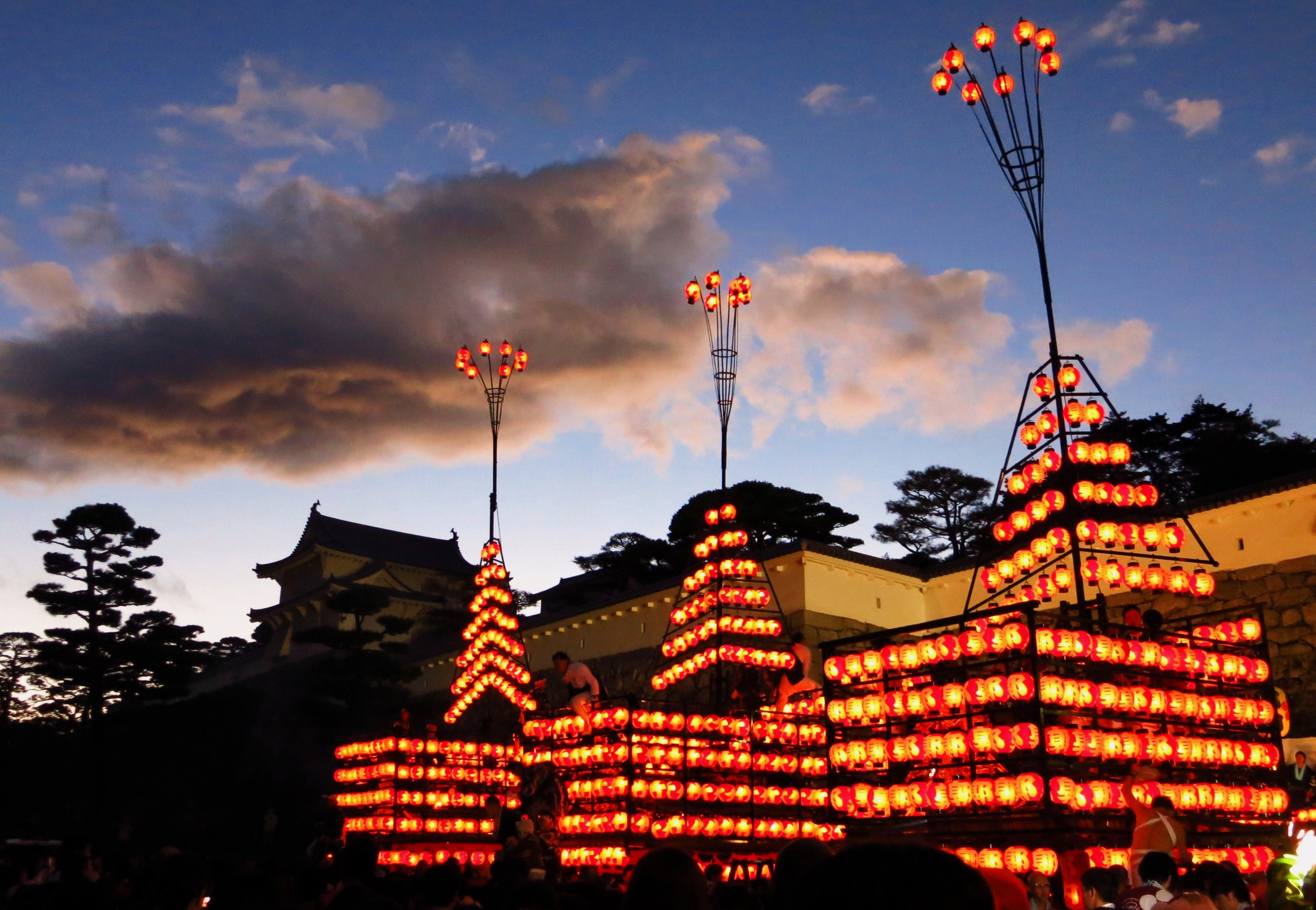
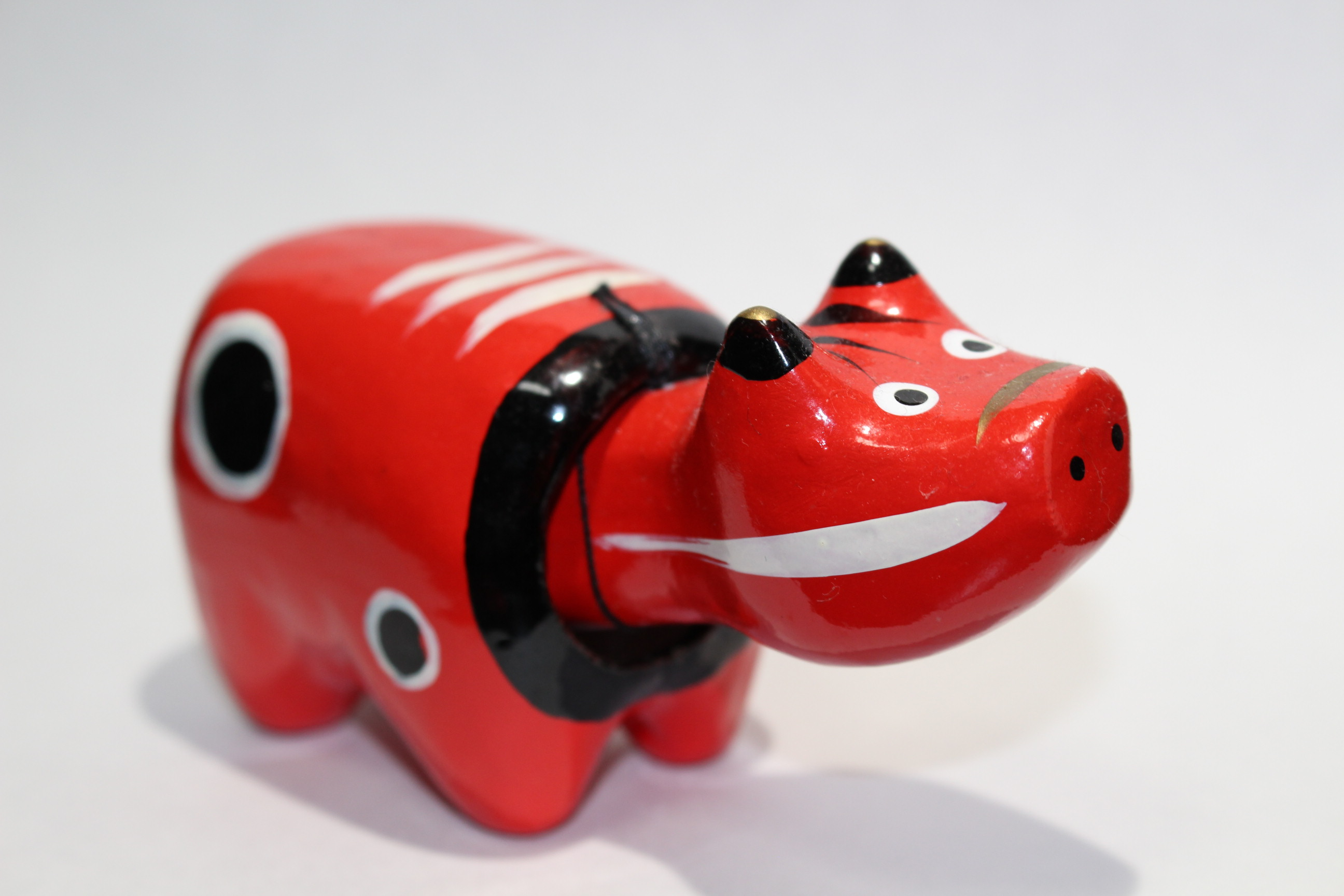
- Mount Bandai and Lake Inawashiro Aizuwakamatsu Castle Abukuma Cave Ōuchi-juku Sōma Nomaoi Festival Nihonmatsu Lantern Festival Akabeko

- Flag Symbol
- Anthem: Fukushima-ken kenmin no uta
- Country: Japan
- Region: Tōhoku
- Island: Honshu
- Capital: Fukushima
- Largest city: Iwaki
- Subdivisions: Districts: 13, Municipalities: 59

Government
  - Governor: Masao Uchibori

Area
  - Total: 13,783.9 km^{2} (5,322.0 sq mi)
  - Rank: 3rd

Population (July 1, 2023)
  - Total: 1,771,100
  - Rank: 20th
  - Density: 128/km^{2} (330/sq mi)

GDP
  - Total: JP¥ 7,865 billion US$ 58.1 billion (2022)
- ISO 3166 code: JP-07
- Website: www.pref.fukushima.lg.jp
- Symbols of Japan
- Bird: Narcissus flycatcher (Ficedula narcissina)
- Flower: Nemotoshakunage (Rhododendron brachycarpum)
- Tree: Japanese zelkova (Zelkova serrata)

Fukushima Prefecture (福島県, Fukushima-ken; Japanese pronunciation: [ɸɯ̥̈.kɯ̈́.ɕì.mä̀, -ɕí.mä́.kè̞ɴ̀]) is a prefecture of Japan located in the Tōhoku region of Honshu. Fukushima Prefecture has a population of 1,771,100 (as of 1 July 2023) and has a geographic area of 13,783.90 square kilometres (5,321.99 sq mi). Fukushima Prefecture borders Miyagi Prefecture and Yamagata Prefecture to the north, Niigata Prefecture to the west, Gunma Prefecture to the southwest, and Tochigi Prefecture and Ibaraki Prefecture to the south.

Fukushima is the capital and as of the 2023 population census, Iwaki is the largest city with Kōriyama following closely behind, with other major cities including Aizuwakamatsu, and Sukagawa. Fukushima Prefecture is located on Japan's eastern Pacific coast at the southernmost part of the Tōhoku region, and is home to Lake Inawashiro, the fourth-largest lake in Japan. Fukushima Prefecture is the third-largest prefecture of Japan (after Hokkaido and Iwate Prefecture) and divided by mountain ranges into the three regions of Aizu, Nakadōri, and Hamadōri.

== History ==
=== Prehistory ===
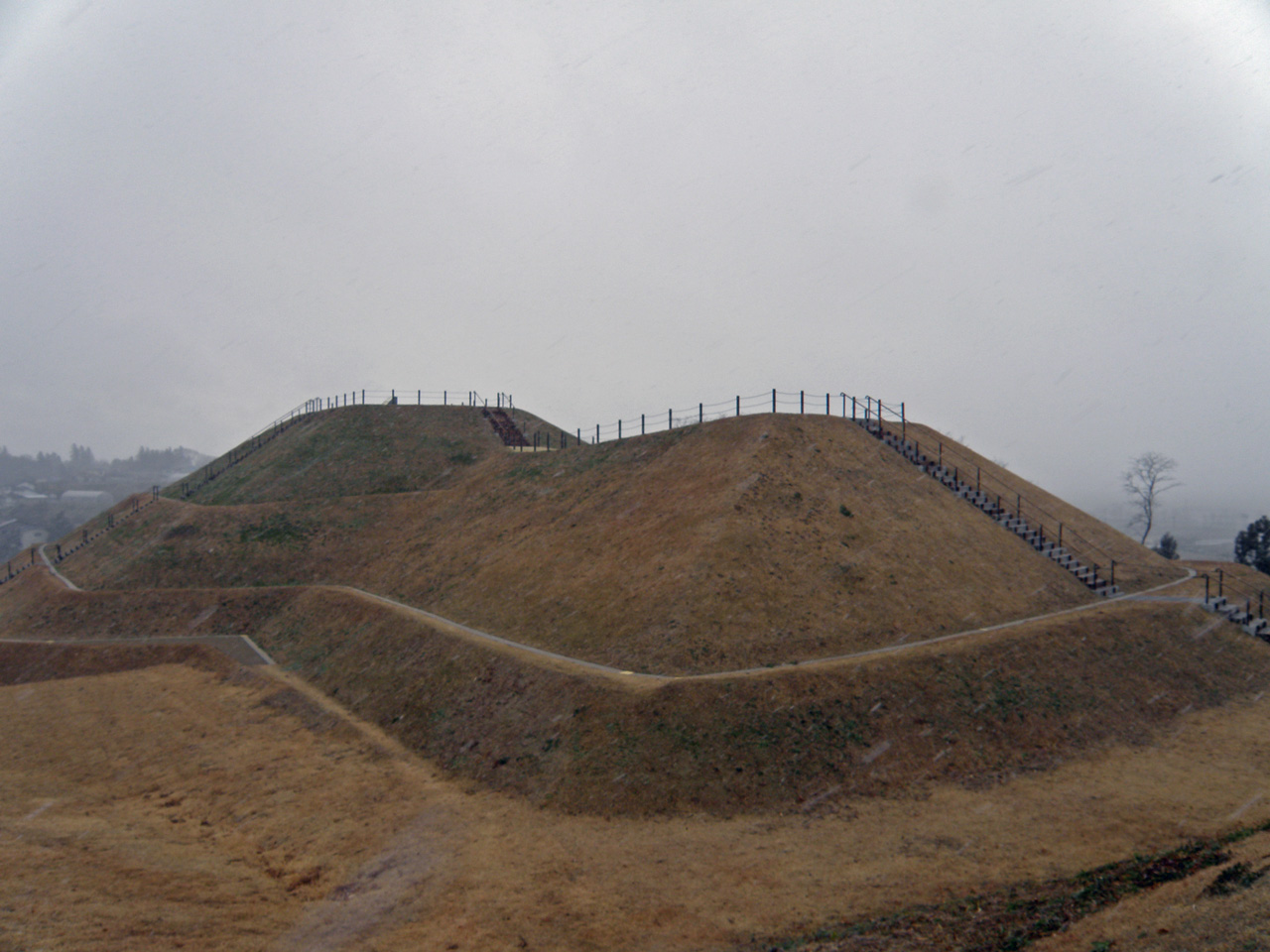
The Ōyasuba Kofun in the Tohoku region

The keyhole-shaped Ōyasuba Kofun is the largest kofun in the Tohoku region. The site was designated a National Historic Site of Japan in 2000.

=== Classical and feudal period ===
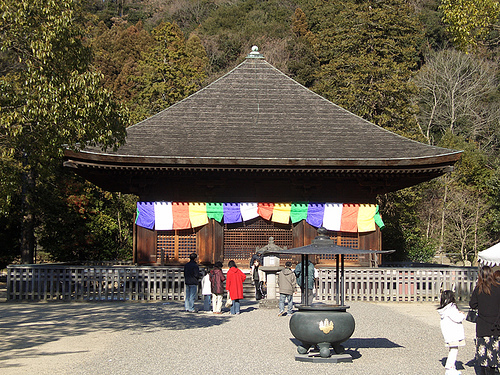
Buddhist chapel Shiramizu Amidadō

Until the Meiji Restoration, the area of Fukushima prefecture was part of what was known as Mutsu Province.

The Shirakawa Barrier and the Nakoso Barrier were built around the 5th century to protect 'the heathens' from the 'barbarians' to the north. Fukushima became a province of Mutsu after the Taika Reforms were established in 646.

In 718, the provinces of Iwase and Iwaki were created, but these areas reverted to Mutsu some time between 722 and 724.

The Shiramizu Amidadō is a chapel within the Buddhist temple Ganjō-ji in Iwaki. It was built in 1160 and it is a National Treasure. The temple, including the paradise garden is an Historic Site.

=== Contemporary period ===
This region of Japan is also known as Michinoku and Ōshū.

The Fukushima Incident, a political tumult, took place in the prefecture after Mishima Michitsune was appointed governor in 1882.

==== 2011 earthquake and subsequent disasters ====
On Friday, March 11, 2011, 14:46 JST, a magnitude 9.0 earthquake occurred off the coast of Miyagi Prefecture. Shindo measurements throughout the prefecture reached as high as 6-upper in isolated regions of Hama-dōri on the eastern coast and as low as a 2 in portions of the Aizu region in the western part of the prefecture. Fukushima City, located in Naka-dōri and the capital of Fukushima Prefecture, measured 6-lower.

Following the earthquake there were isolated reports of major damage to structures, including the failure of Fujinuma Dam as well as damage from landslides. The earthquake also triggered a massive tsunami that hit the eastern coast of the prefecture and caused widespread destruction and loss of life. In the two years following the earthquake, 1,817 residents of Fukushima Prefecture had either been confirmed dead or were missing as a result of the earthquake and tsunami.

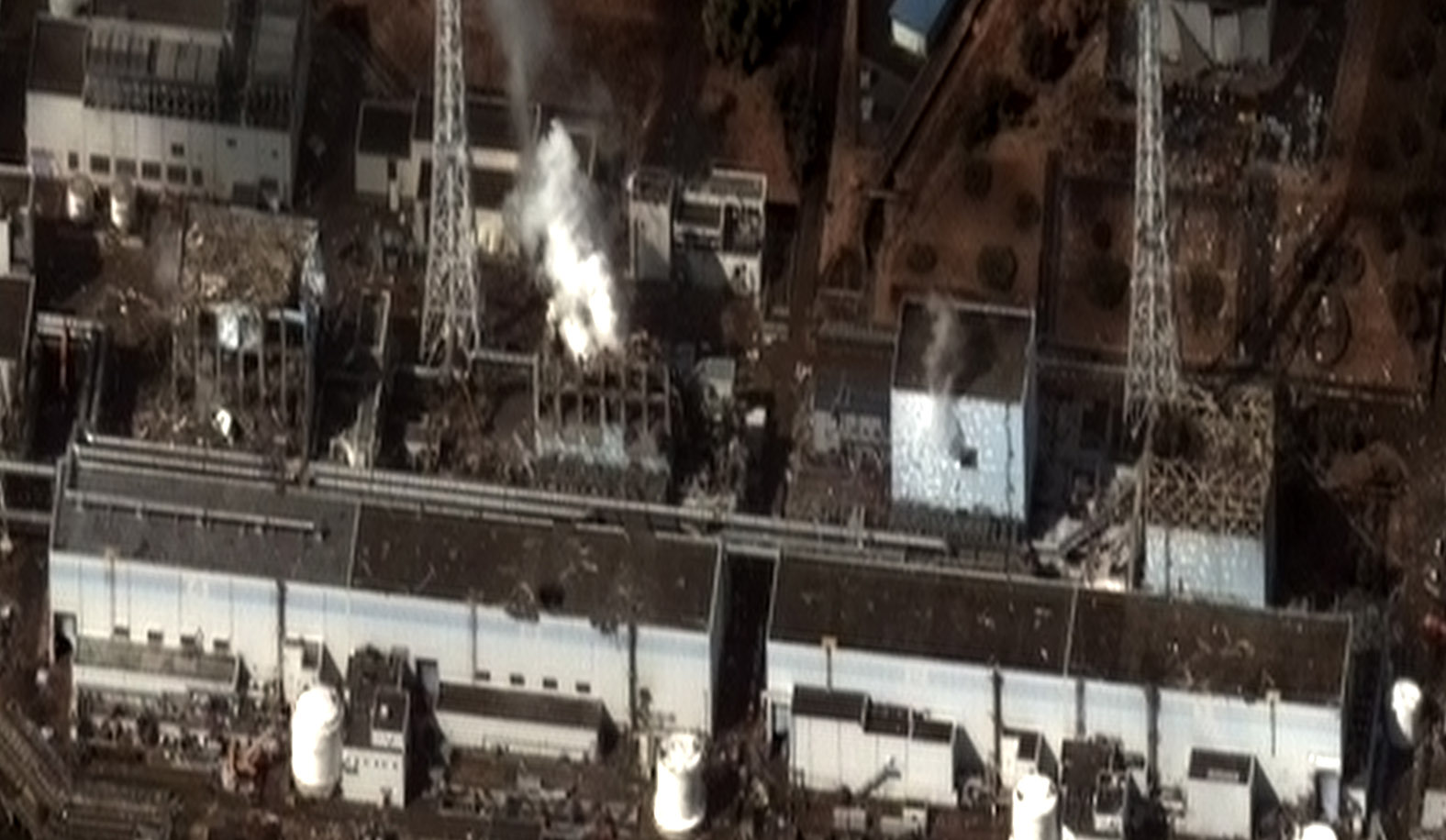
Three of the reactors at Fukushima Daiichi overheated, causing meltdowns that led to explosions, which released large amounts of radioactive material into the air

In the aftermath of the earthquake and tsunami that followed, the outer housings of two of the six reactors at the Fukushima Daiichi Nuclear Power Plant in Ōkuma exploded followed by a partial meltdown and fires at three of the other units. Many residents were evacuated to nearby localities due to the development of a large evacuation zone around the plant. Radiation levels near the plant peaked at 400 mSv/h (millisieverts per hour) after the earthquake and tsunami, due to damage sustained. This resulted in increased recorded radiation levels across Japan. On April 11, 2011, officials upgraded the disaster to a level 7 out of a possible 7, a rare occurrence not seen since the Chernobyl disaster in 1986. Several months later, officials announced that although the area nearest the melt down were still off limits, areas near the twenty kilometer radial safe zone could start seeing a return of the close to 47,000 residents that had been evacuated.

== Geography ==
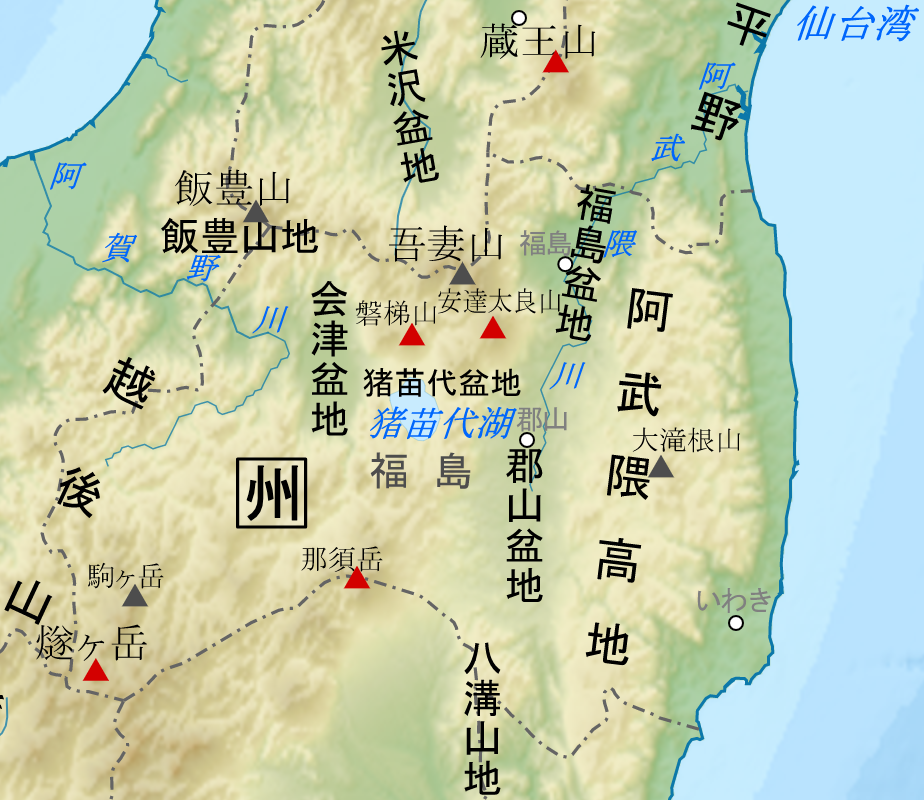
Topographic map of Fukushima Prefecture

Map of Fukushima Prefecture City Town Village

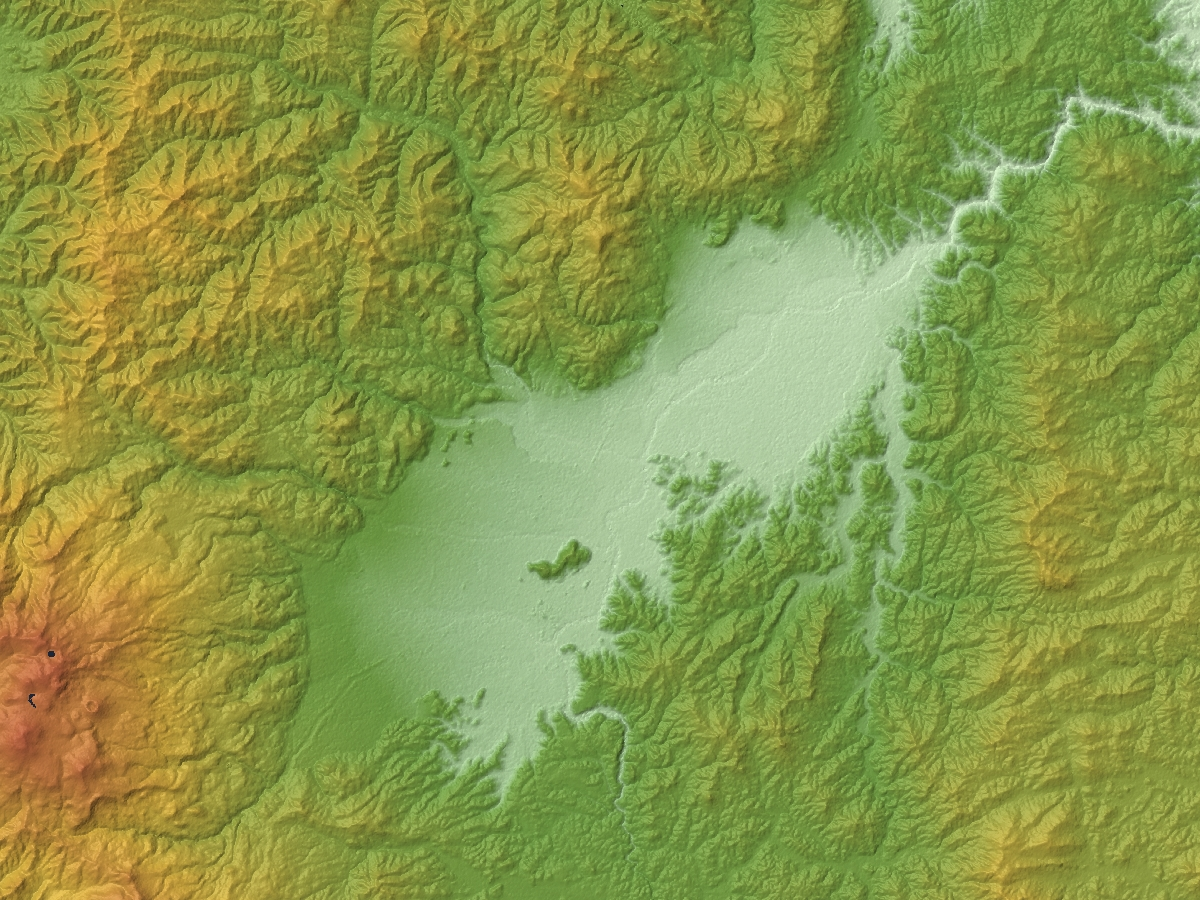
Topographic map of Fukushima Basin. The lower left is Mount Azuma-kofuji, and Mount Shinobu can be seen as the isolated elevated land mass in the southeast of the basin.

Fukushima is both the southernmost prefecture of Tōhoku region and the prefecture of Tōhoku region that is closest to Tokyo. With an area size of 13,784 km^{2} (5,322 sq mi) it is the third-largest prefecture of Japan, behind Hokkaido and Iwate Prefecture. It is divided by mountain ranges into three regions called (from west to east) Aizu, Nakadōri, and Hamadōri.

Fukushima city is located in the Fukushima Basin's southwest area and nearby mountains. Aizuwakamatsu is located in the western part of Fukushima Prefecture, in the southeast part of Aizu basin. Mount Bandai is the highest mountain in the prefecture with an elevation of 1,819 m (5,968 ft). Mount Azuma-kofuji is an active stratovolcano that is 1,705 m (5,594 ft) tall with many onsen nearby. Lake Inawashiro is the 4th largest lake of Japan (103.3 km^{2} (39.9 sq mi)) in the center of the prefecture.

The coastal Hamadōri region lies on the Pacific Ocean and is the flattest and most temperate region, while the Nakadōri region is the agricultural heart of the prefecture and contains the capital, Fukushima City. The mountainous Aizu region has scenic lakes, lush forests, and snowy winters.

As of April 1, 2012, 13% of the total land area of the prefecture was designated as Natural Parks, namely Bandai-Asahi, Nikkō, and Oze National Parks; Echigo Sanzan-Tadami Quasi-National Park; and eleven Prefectural Natural Parks.

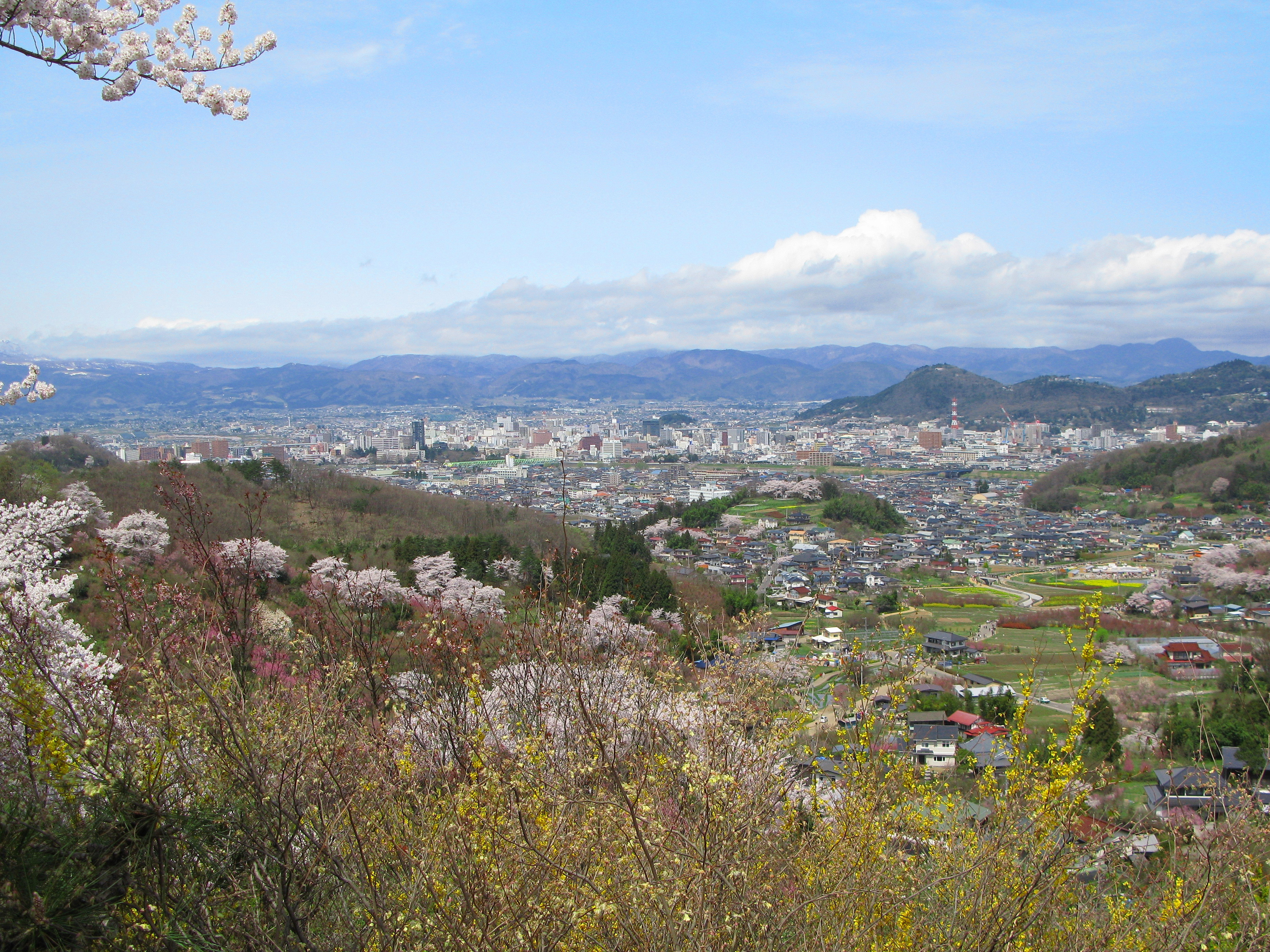
View of Fukushima Basin from Hanamiyama Park

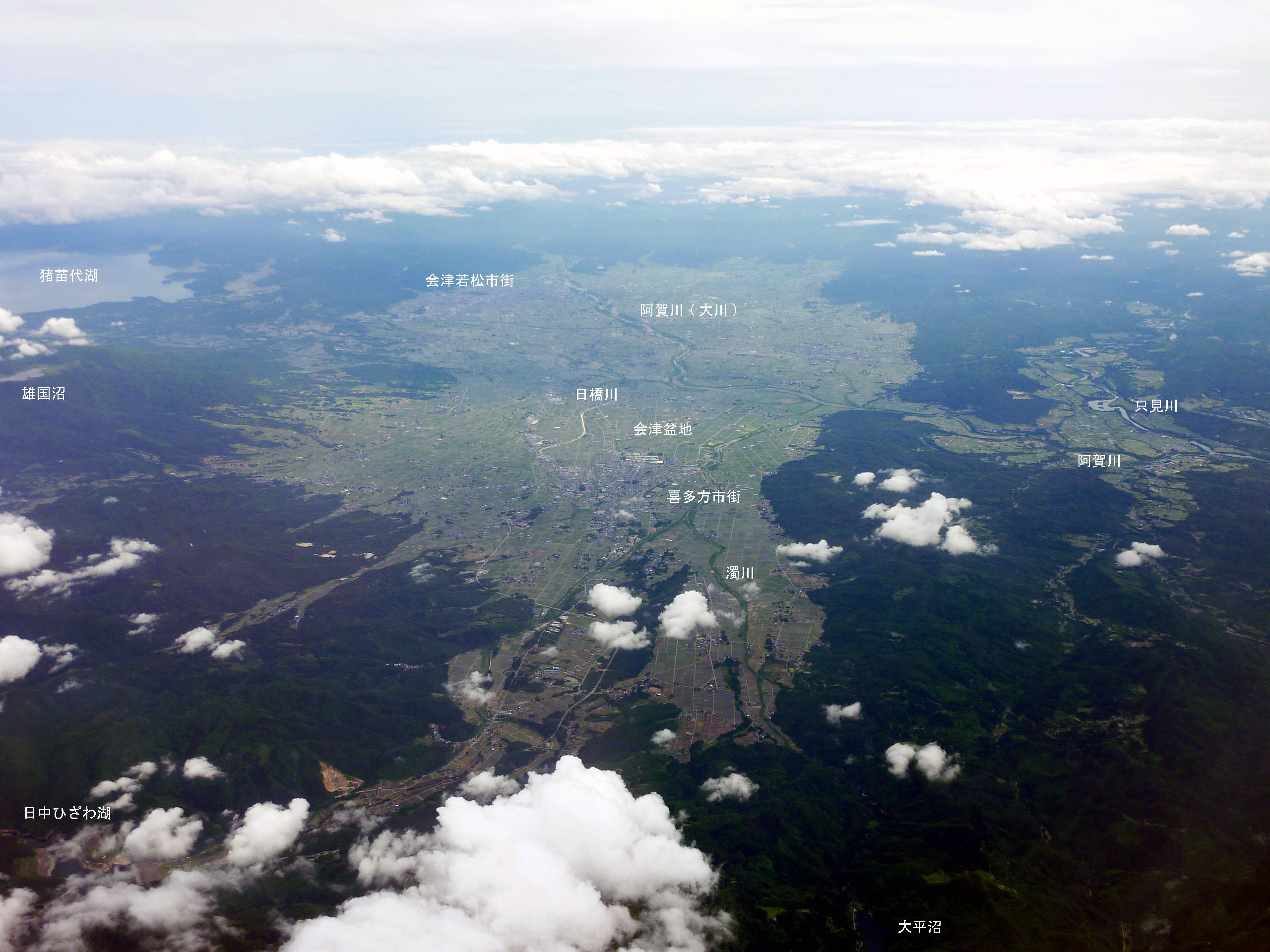
Aizu basin

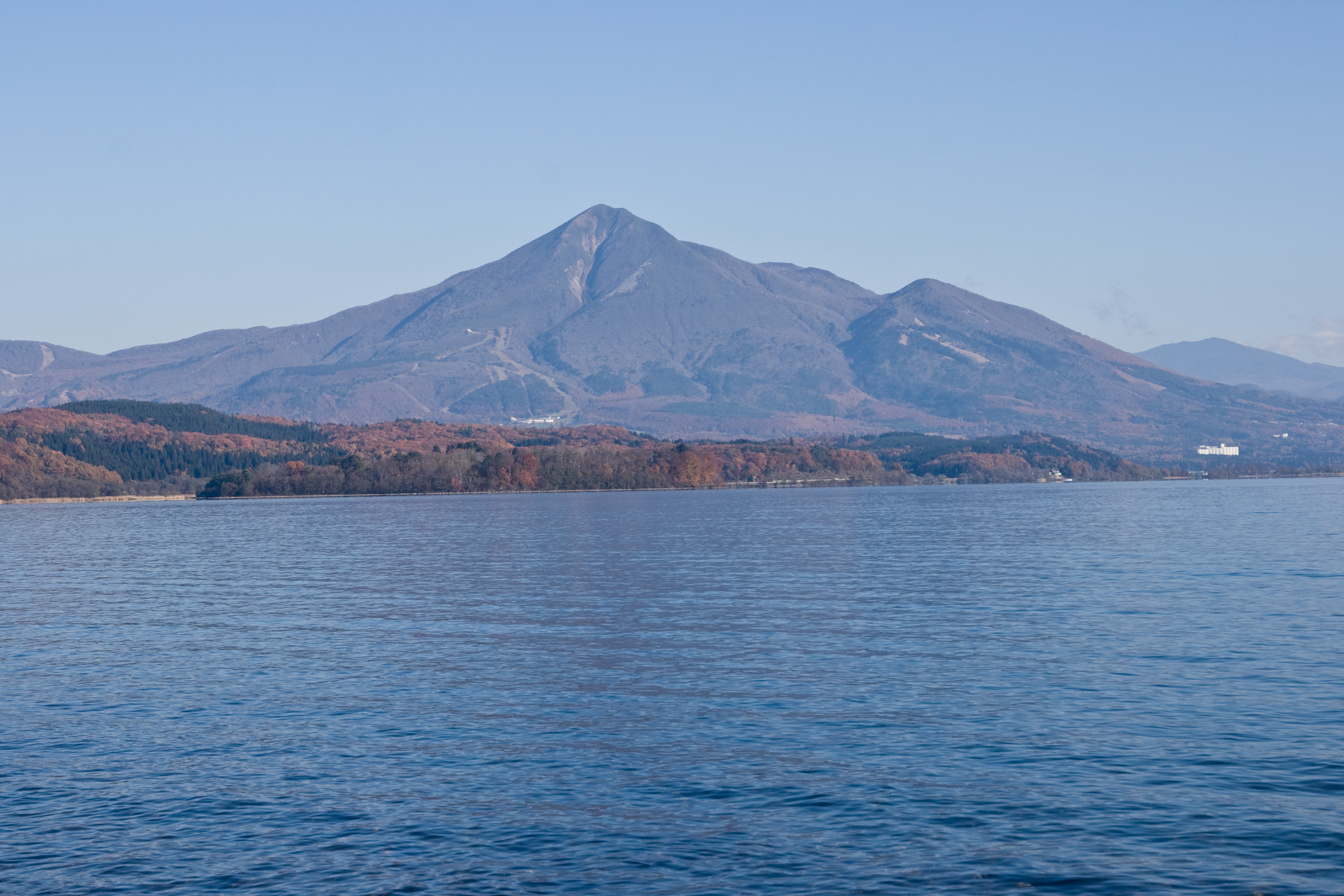
Mount Bandai and Lake Inawashiro

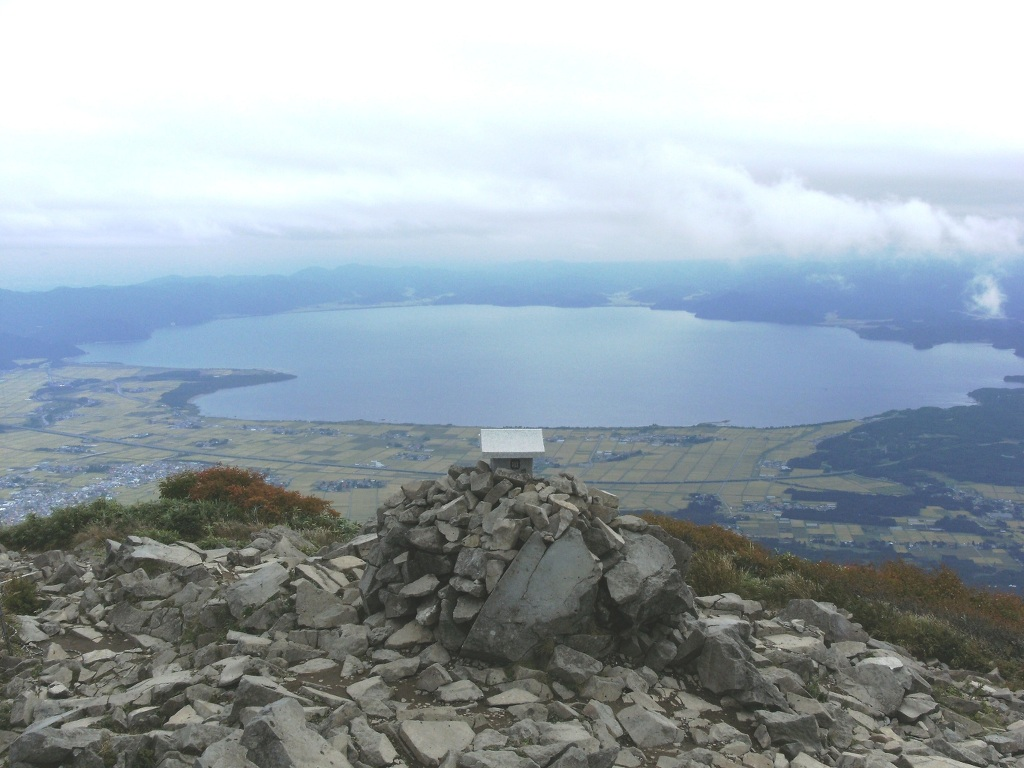
Lake Inawashiro viewed from Mount Bandai

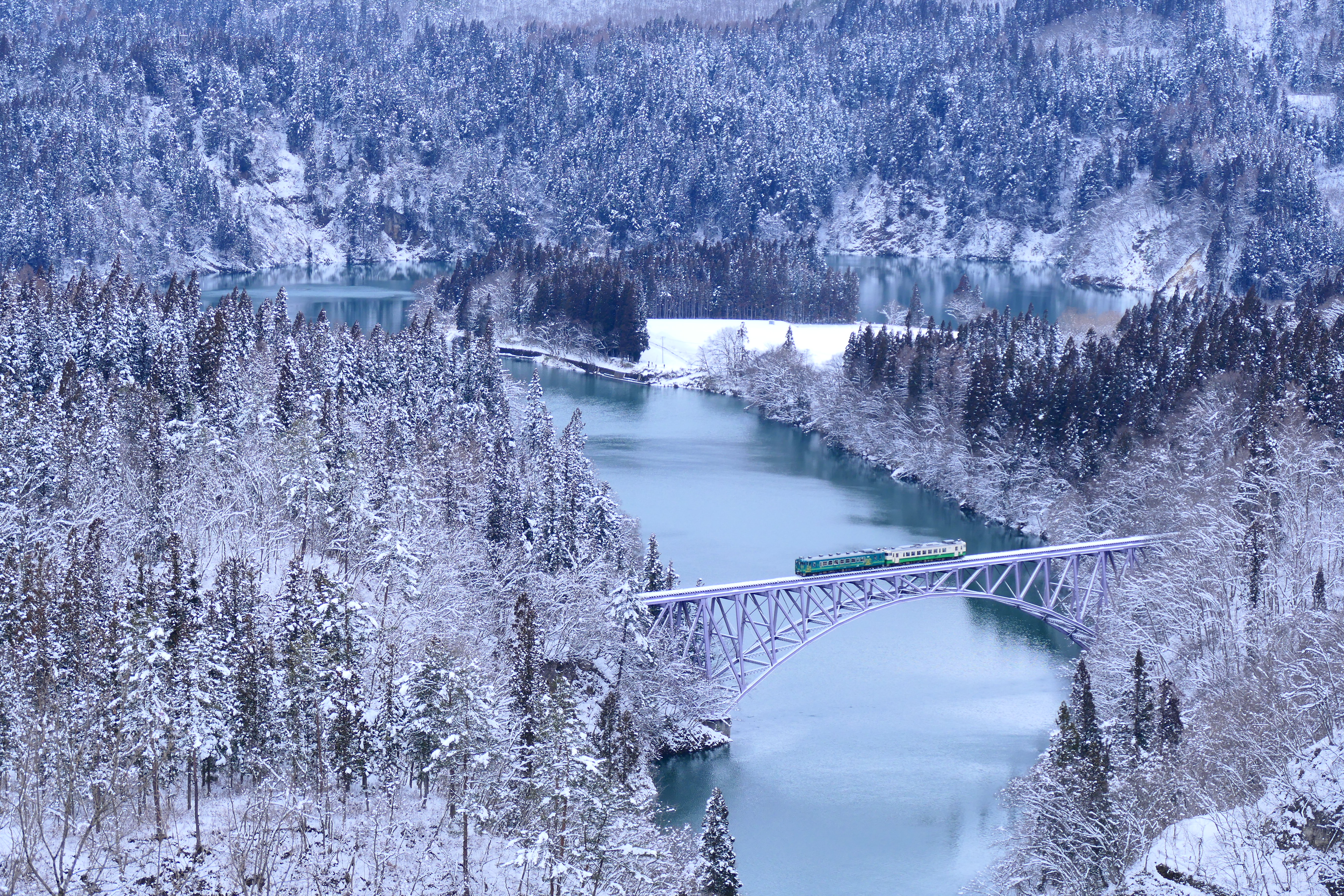
Tadami River and Tadami Line in winter

=== Cities ===
Thirteen cities are located in Fukushima Prefecture:

Flag	Name		Area (km^{2})	Population	Map
Flag	Rōmaji	Kanji	Area (km^{2})	Population	Map
	Aizuwakamatsu	会津若松市	382.97	117,376	
	Date	伊達市	265.12	58,240	
	Fukushima (capital)	福島市	767.72	282,693	
	Iwaki	いわき市	1,232.02	332,931	
	Kitakata	喜多方市	554.63	44,760	
	Kōriyama	郡山市	757.2	327,692	
	Minamisōma	南相馬市	398.58	59,005	
	Motomiya	本宮市	88.02	30,236	
	Nihonmatsu	二本松市	344.42	53,557	
	Shirakawa	白河市	305.32	59,491	
	Sōma	相馬市	197.79	34,865	
	Sukagawa	須賀川市	279.43	74,992	
	Tamura	田村市	458.3	35,169	

=== Cityscape ===
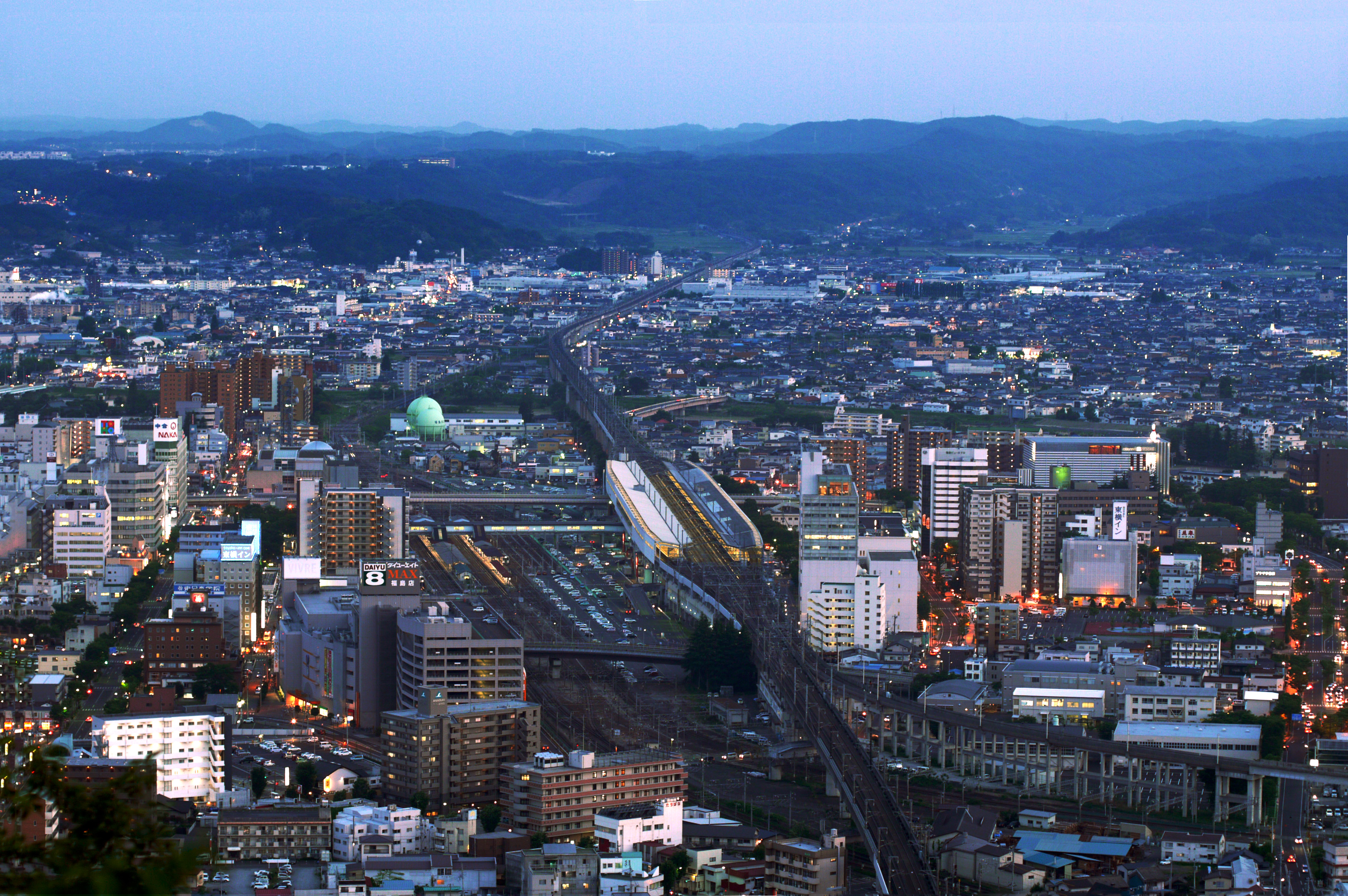
Fukushima City (May 2011)

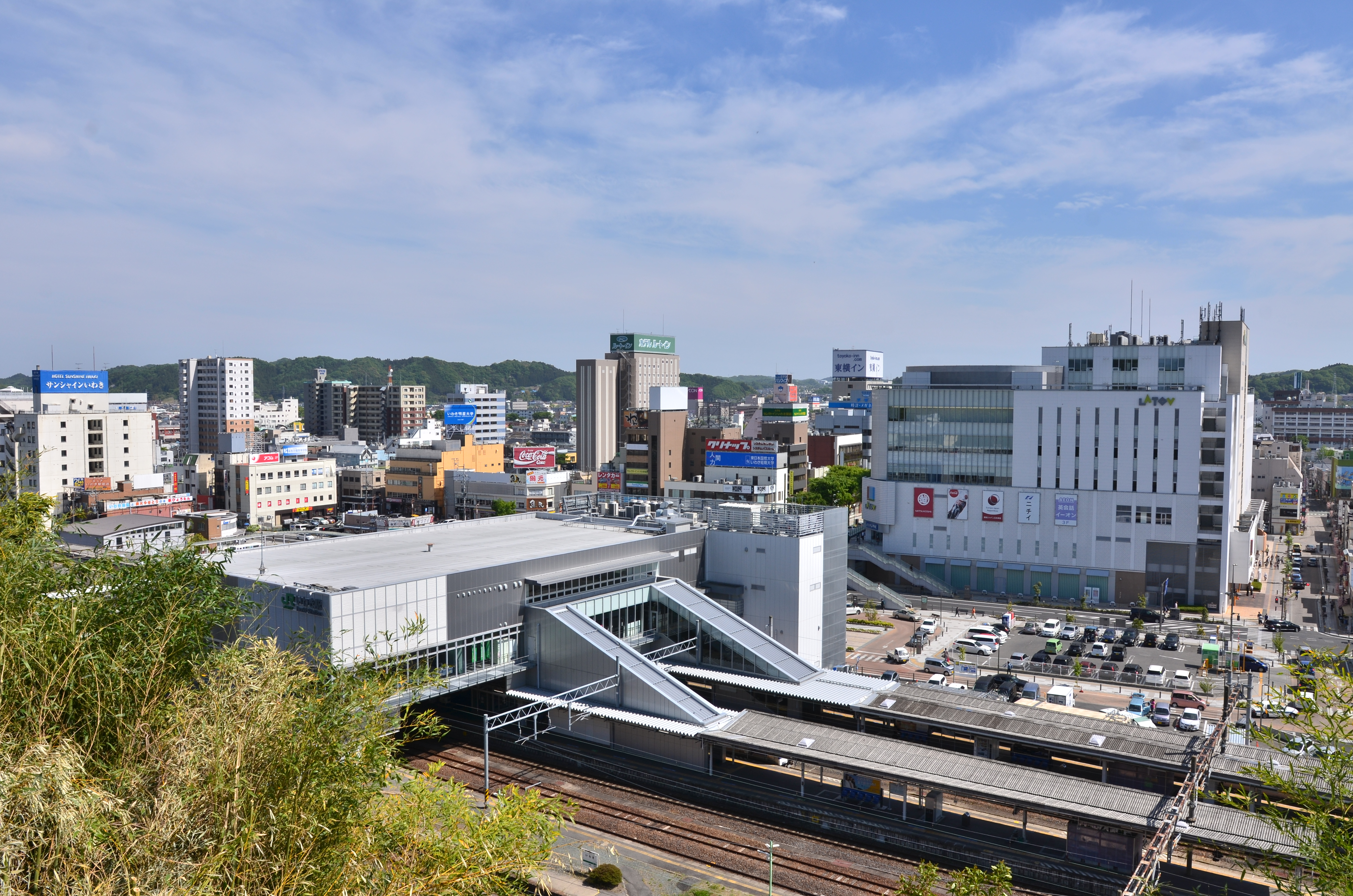
Iwaki (August 2012)

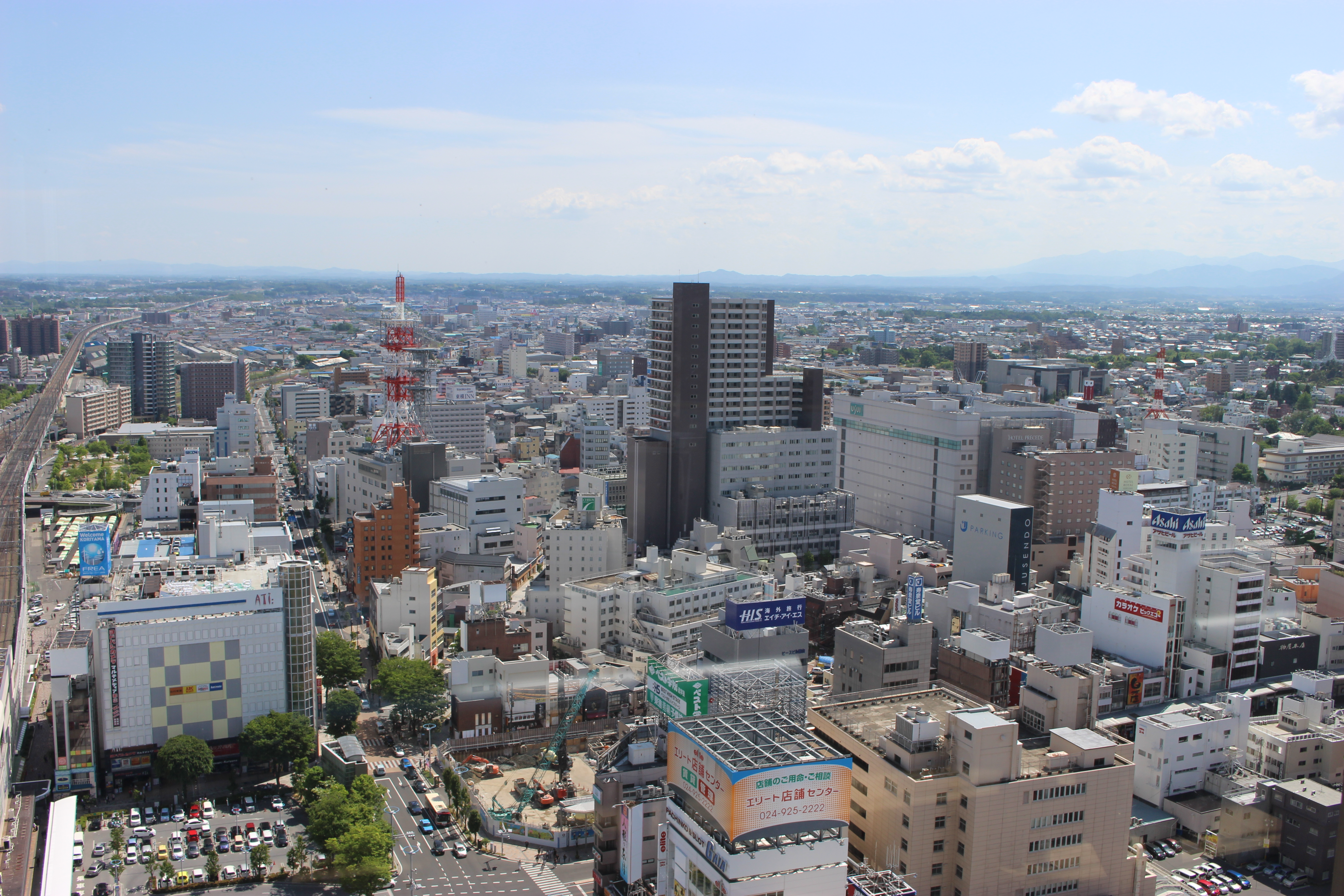
Kōriyama (May 2015)

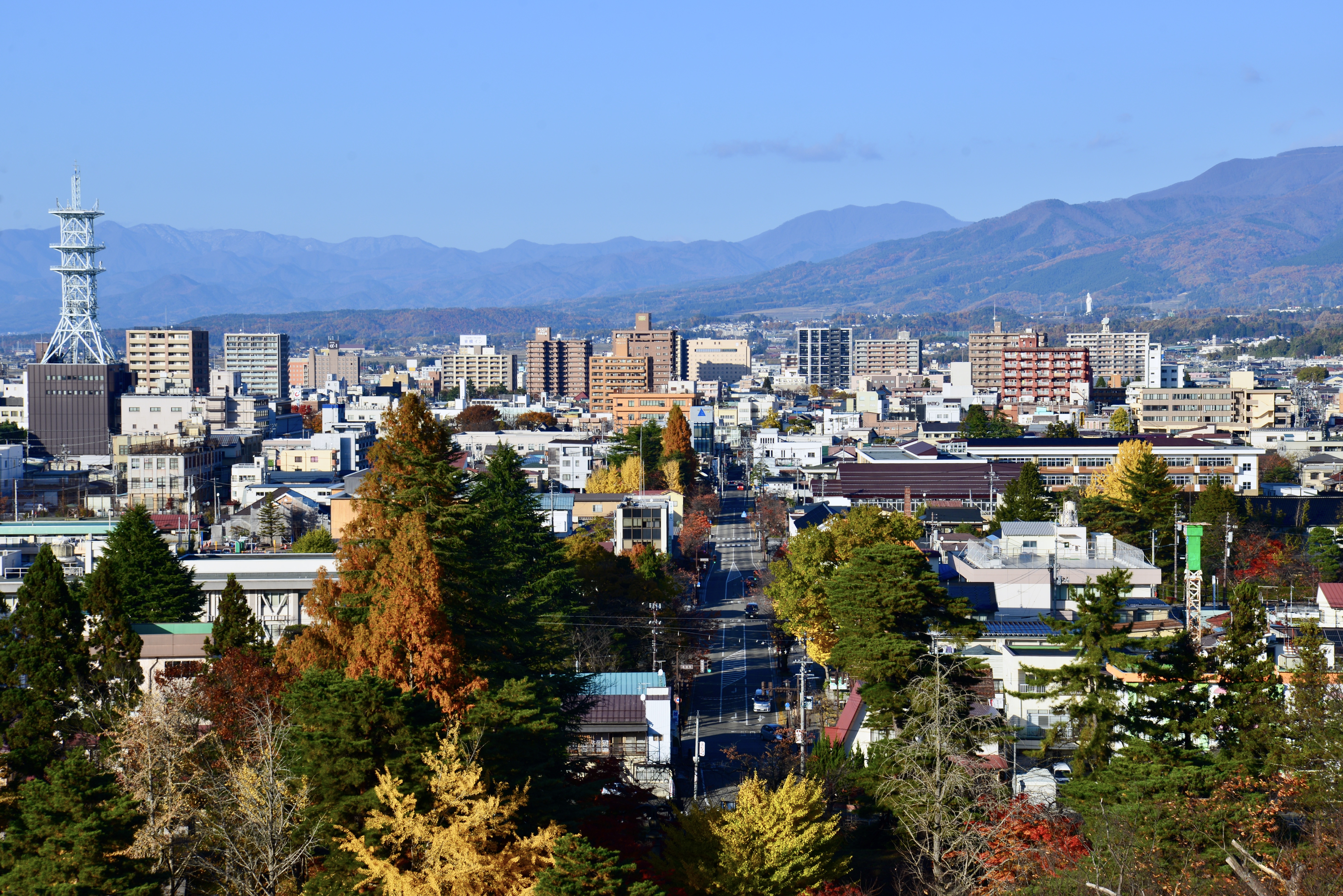
Aizuwakamatsu (November 2020)

=== Towns and villages ===
These are the towns and villages in each district:

Flag	Name		Area (km^{2})	Population	District	Type	Map
Flag	Rōmaji	Kanji	Area (km^{2})	Population	District	Type	Map
	Aizubange	会津坂下町	91.59	15,068	Kawanuma District	Town	
	Aizumisato	会津美里町	276.33	19,014	Ōnuma District	Town	
	Asakawa	浅川町	37.43	6,036	Ishikawa District	Town	
	Bandai	磐梯町	59.77	3,322	Yama District	Town	
	Furudono	古殿町	163.29	4,825	Ishikawa District	Town	
	Futaba	双葉町	51.42	0; 6,093 (recorded)	Futaba District	Town	
	Hanawa	塙町	211.41	8,302	Higashishirakawa District	Town	
	Hinoemata	檜枝岐村	390.46	504	Minamiaizu District	Village	
	Hirata	平田村	93.42	5,826	Ishikawa District	Village	
	Hirono	広野町	58.69	5,412	Futaba District	Town	
	Iitate	飯舘村	230.13	1,318; 5,946 (recorded)	Sōma District	Village	
	Inawashiro	猪苗代町	394.85	13,552	Yama District	Town	
	Ishikawa	石川町	115.71	14,644	Ishikawa District	Town	
	Izumizaki	泉崎村	35.43	6,213	Nishishirakawa District	Village	
	Kagamiishi	鏡石町	31.3	12,318	Iwase District	Town	
	Kaneyama	金山町	293.92	1,862	Ōnuma District	Town	
	Katsurao	葛尾村	84.37	420 1,387 (recorded)	Futaba District	Village	
	Kawamata	川俣町	127.7	12,170	Date District	Town	
	Kawauchi	川内村	197.35	2,044	Futaba District	Village	
	Kitashiobara	北塩原村	234.08	2,556	Yama District	Village	
	Koori	桑折町	42.97	11,459	Date District	Town	
	Kunimi	国見町	37.95	8,639	Date District	Town	
	Miharu	三春町	72.76	17,018	Tamura District	Town	
	Minamiaizu	南会津町	886.47	14,451	Minamiaizu District	Town	
	Mishima	三島町	90.81	1,452	Ōnuma District	Town	
	Nakajima	中島村	18.92	4,885	Nishishirakawa District	Village	
	Namie	浪江町	223.14	1,923; 17,114 (recorded)	Futaba District	Town	
	Naraha	楢葉町	103.64	3,710	Futaba District	Town	
	Nishiaizu	西会津町	298.18	5,770	Yama District	Town	
	Nishigō	西郷村	192.06	20,808	Nishishirakawa District	Village	
	Ōkuma	大熊町	78.71	847; 11,505 (recorded)	Futaba District	Town	
	Ono	小野町	125.11	9,471	Tamura District	Town	
	Ōtama	大玉村	79.44	8,900	Adachi District	Village	
	Samegawa	鮫川村	131.34	3,049	Higashishirakawa District	Village	
	Shimogō	下郷町	317.04	5,264	Minamiaizu District	Town	
	Shinchi	新地町	46.7	7,905	Sōma District	Town	
	Shōwa	昭和村	209.46	1,246	Ōnuma District	Village	
	Tadami	只見町	747.56	4,044	Minamiaizu District	Town	
	Tamakawa	玉川村	46.67	6,392	Ishikawa District	Village	
	Tanagura	棚倉町	159.93	13,343	Higashishirakawa District	Town	
	Ten-ei	天栄村	225.52	5,194	Iwase District	Village	
	Tomioka	富岡町	68.39	2,128	Futaba District	Town	
	Yabuki	矢吹町	60.4	17,287	Nishishirakawa District	Town	
	Yamatsuri	矢祭町	118.27	5,392	Higashishirakawa District	Town	
	Yanaizu	柳津町	175.82	3,081	Kawanuma District	Town	
	Yugawa	湯川村	16.37	3,081	Kawanuma District	Village	

== Government ==
=== List of governors of Fukushima Prefecture (from 1947) ===
- Kanichiro Ishihara (石原幹市郎) – April 12, 1947 to November 30, 1949
- Sakuma Otake (大竹作摩) – January 28, 1950 to July 25, 1957
- Zenichiro Sato (佐藤善一郎) – August 25, 1957 to March 23, 1964
- Morie Kimura (木村守江) – May 16, 1964 to August 11, 1976
- Isao Matsudaira (松平勇雄) – September 19, 1976 to September 18, 1988
- Eisaku Satō (佐藤栄佐久) – September 19, 1988 to September 28, 2006
- Yūhei Satō (佐藤 雄平) – November 12, 2006 to November 11, 2014
- Masao Uchibori (内堀 雅雄) – November 12, 2014 to present

== Demographics ==
A total of 1,833,152 people live in the Fukushima Prefecture.

Fukushima prefecture population pyramid in 2020

Historical population

Year	Pop.	±% p.a.
1880	808,937	—
1890	952,489	+1.65%
1903	1,175,224	+1.63%
1913	1,303,501	+1.04%
1920	1,362,750	+0.64%
1925	1,437,596	+1.08%
1930	1,508,150	+0.96%
1935	1,581,563	+0.96%
1940	1,625,521	+0.55%
1945	1,957,356	+3.79%
1950	2,062,394	+1.05%
1955	2,095,237	+0.32%
1960	2,051,137	−0.42%

Year	Pop.	±% p.a.
1965	1,983,754	−0.67%
1970	1,946,077	−0.38%
1975	1,970,616	+0.25%
1980	2,035,272	+0.65%
1985	2,080,304	+0.44%
1990	2,104,058	+0.23%
1995	2,133,592	+0.28%
2000	2,126,935	−0.06%
2005	2,091,319	−0.34%
2010	2,029,064	−0.60%
2015	1,914,039	−1.16%
2020	1,833,152	−0.86%

== Economy ==
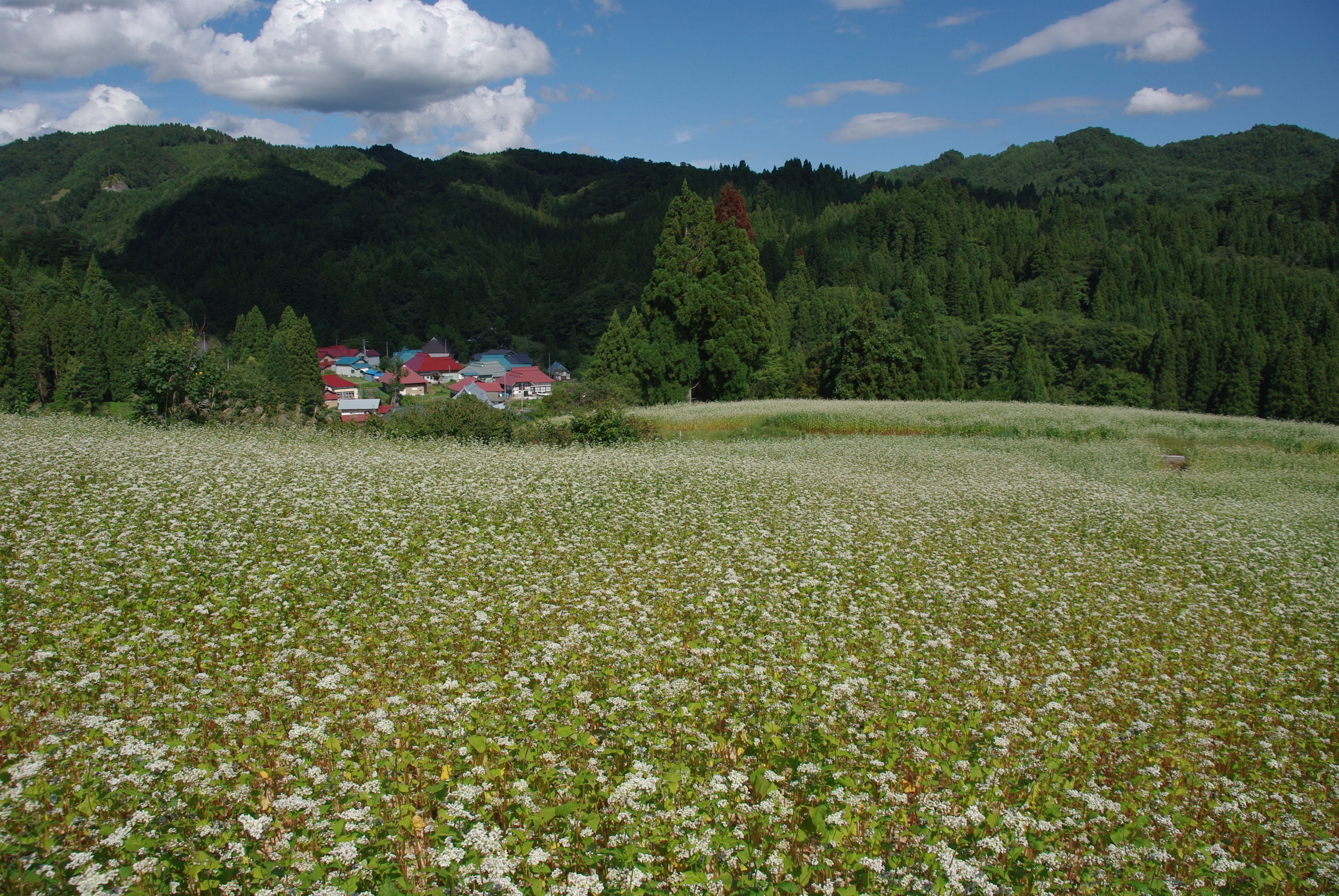
Buckwheat field in Yamato, Kitakata

The coastal region is home to thriving fishing and seafood industries, and is notable for its electricity-generating capability, especially nuclear power, while the upland regions are more focused on agriculture. Thanks to Fukushima's climate, various fruits are grown throughout the year. These include pears, peaches, cherries, grapes, and apples. As of March 2011, the prefecture produced 20.6% of Japan's peaches and 8.7% of its cucumbers.

Fukushima also produces rice, which is combined with pure water from mountain run-off to make sake. Some sakes from the region are considered so tasteful that they are served to visiting royalty and world leaders by hosts.

Lacquerware is another popular product from Fukushima. Dating back over four hundred years, the process of making lacquerware involves carving an object out of wood, then putting a lacquer on it and decorating it. Objects made are usually dishes, vases and writing materials.

== Culture ==
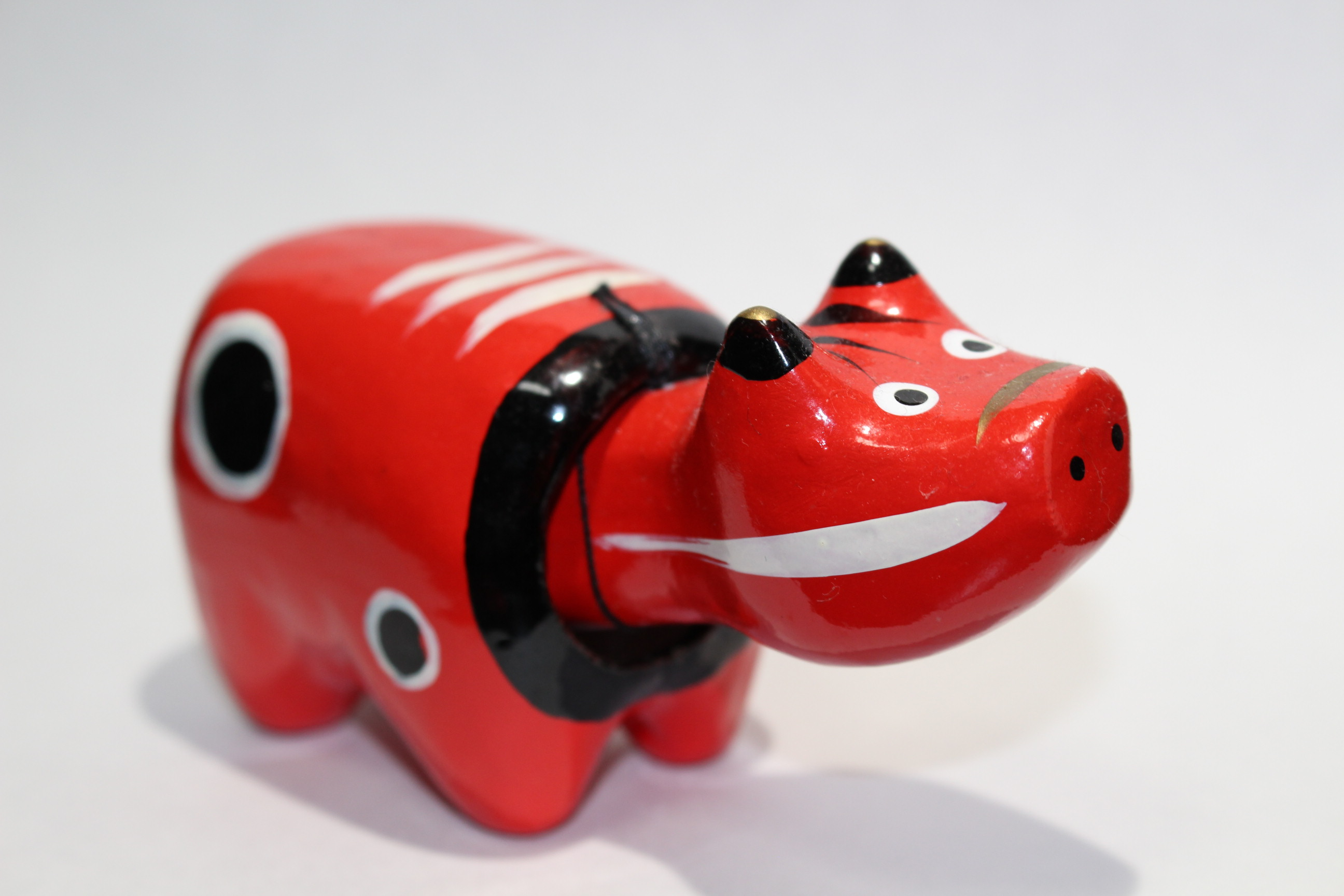
Akabeko

Legend has it that an ogress, Adachigahara, once roamed the plain after whom it was named. The Adachigahara plain lies close to the city of Fukushima.

Other stories, such as that of a large, strong, red cow that carried wood, influenced toys and superstitions. The Akabeko cow is a small, red papier-mâché cow on a bamboo or wooden frame, and is believed to ease child birth, bring good health, and help children grow up as strong as the cow.

Another superstitious talisman of the region is the Okiagari-koboshi, or self-righting dharma doll. These dolls are seen as bringers of good luck and prosperity because they stand right back up when knocked down.

Miharu-goma are small, wooden, black or white toy horses painted with colorful designs. Depending upon their design, they may be believed to bring things like long life to the owner.

Kokeshi dolls, while less symbolic, are also a popular traditional craft. They are carved wooden dolls, with large round heads and hand painted bodies. Kokeshi dolls are popular throughout many regions of Japan, but Fukushima is credited as their birthplace.

== Notable festivals and events ==
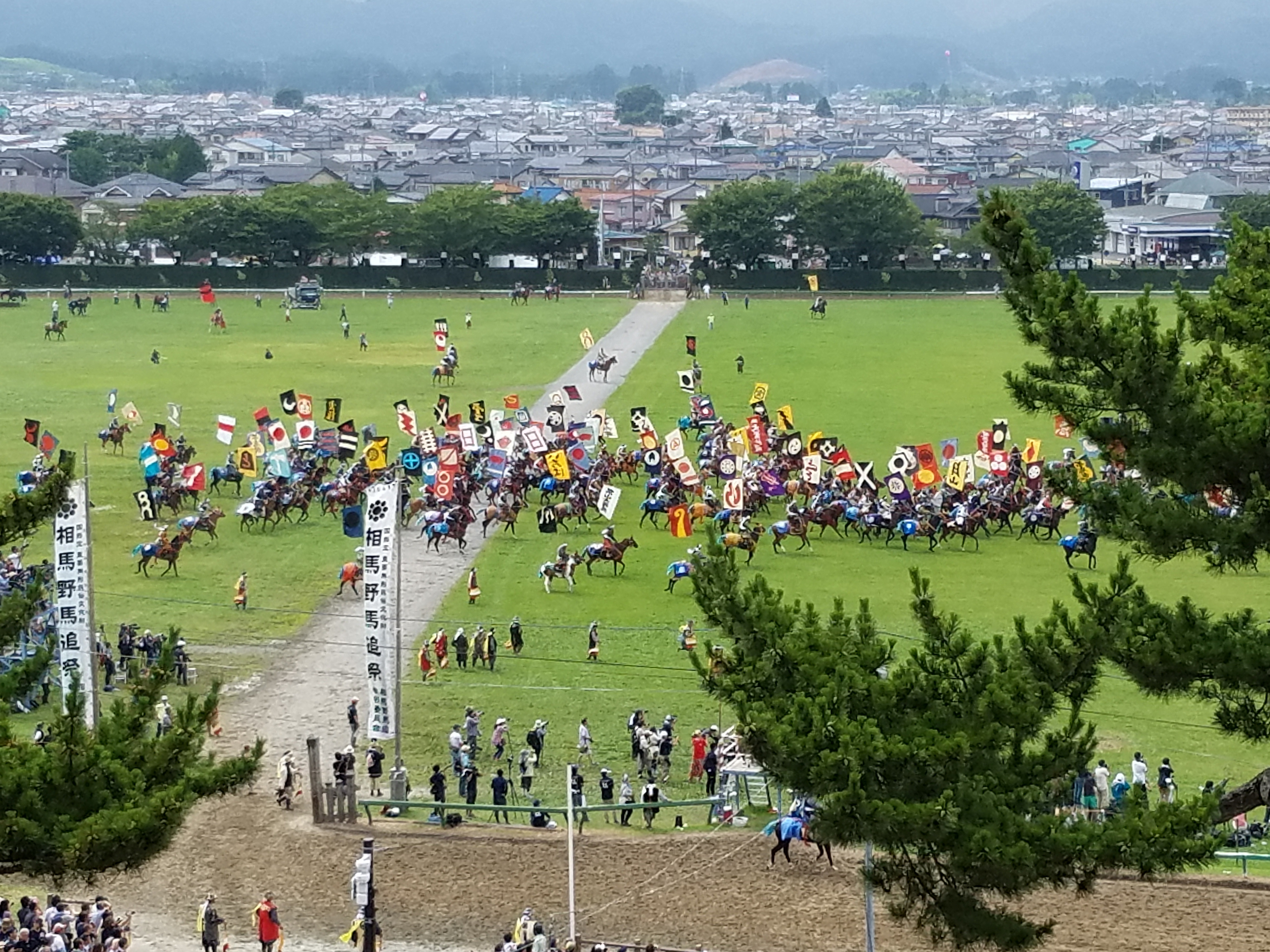
Sōma Nomaoi in July

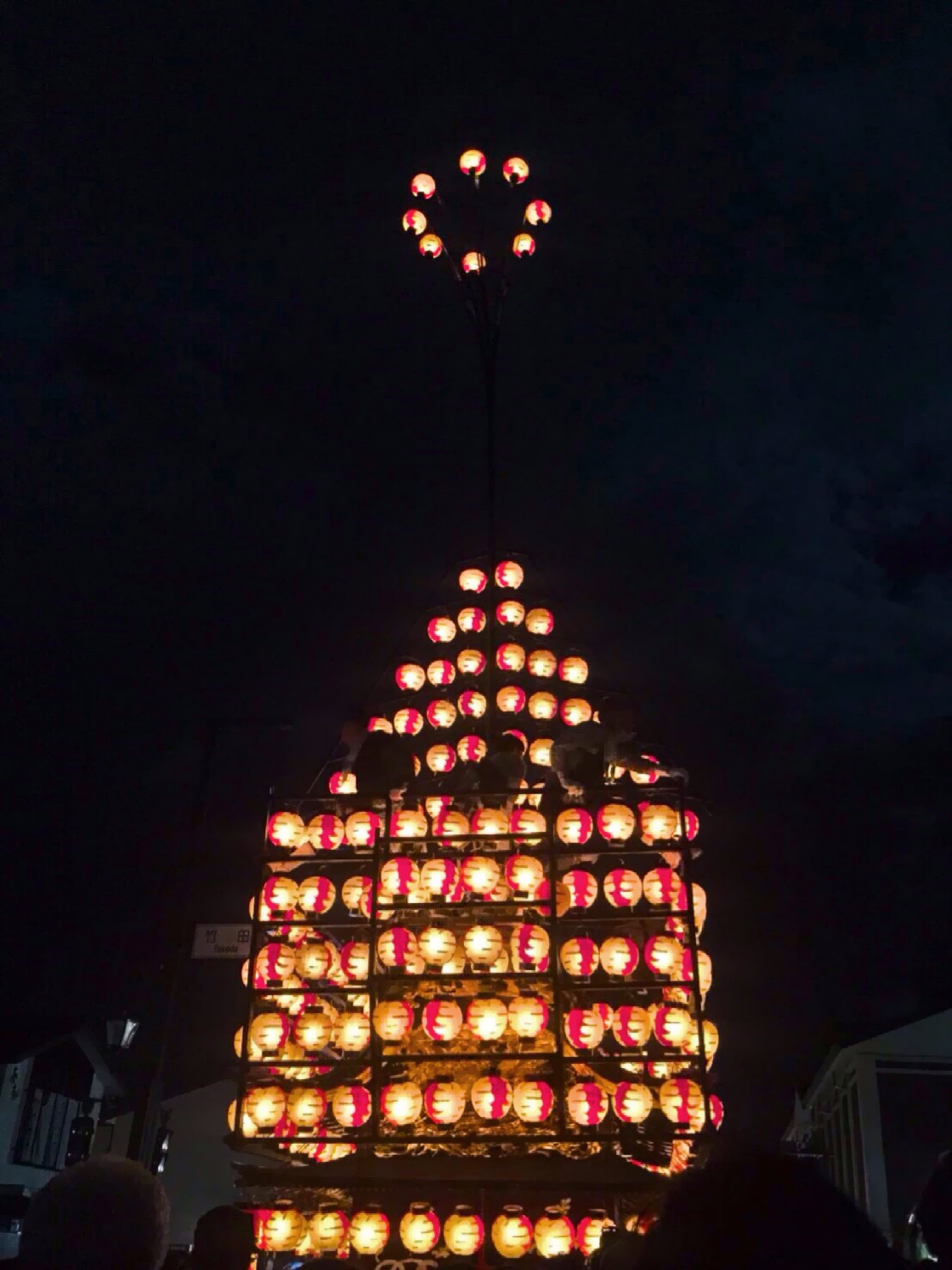
Nihonmatsu Lantern Festival in October

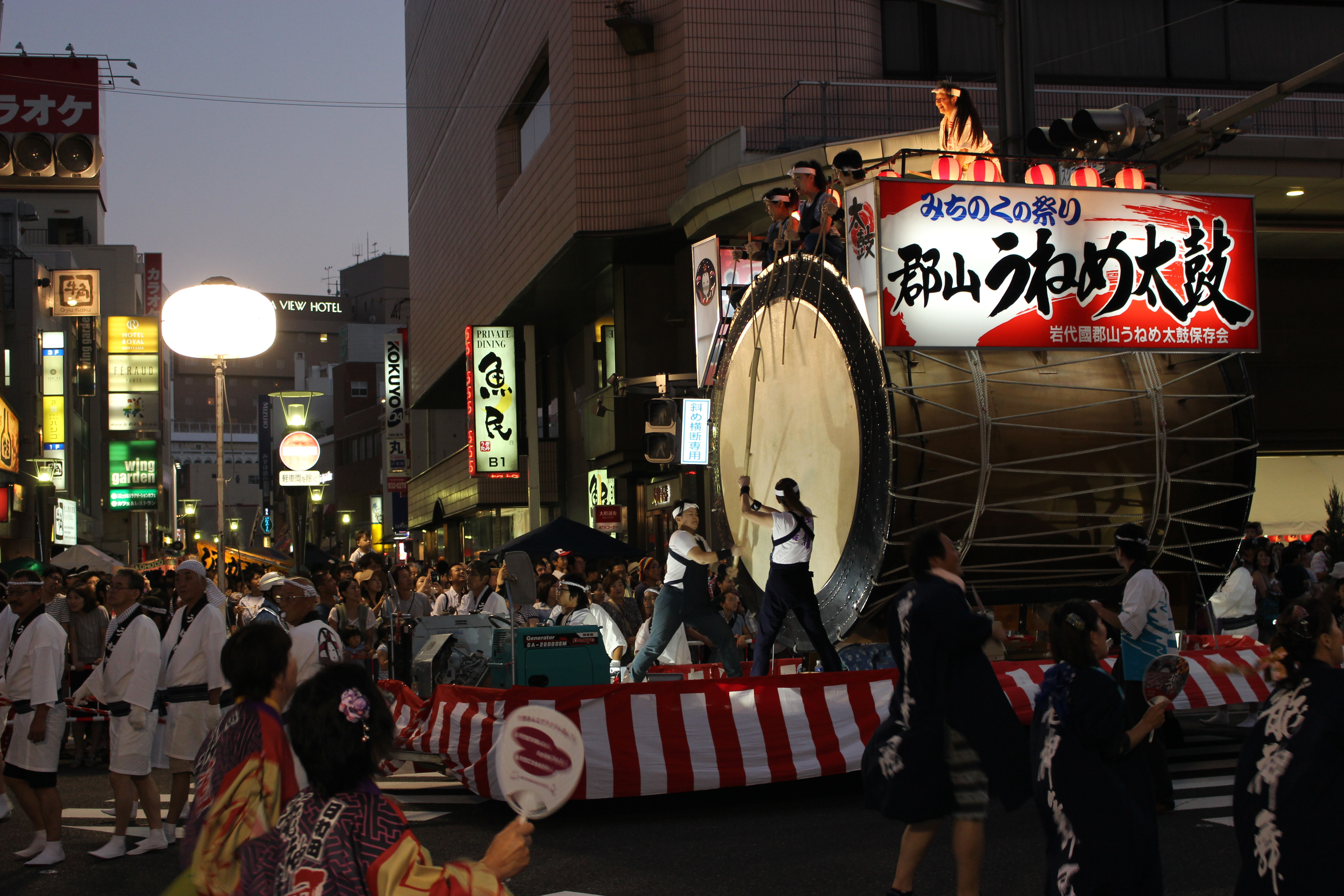
Uneme Festival of Koriyama in August

- Sōma's Nomaoi Festival (相馬野馬追, Sōma Nomaoi) is held every summer.

The Nomaoi Festival horse riders dressed in complete samurai attire can be seen racing, chasing wild horses, or having contests that imitate a battle. The history behind the festival and events is over one thousand years old.

- Fukushima's Waraji Festival (わらじまつり, Waraji Matsuri) is held on the first weekend of August

During the Waraji Festival, a large (12-meter, 38-ft) straw sandal built by locals is dedicated to a shrine. There is also a traditional Taiwanese dragon dance, or Ryumai, performed by Taiwanese visitors.

- Aizuwakamatsu's Aizu Festival (会津まつり, Aizu Matsuri) is held in late September

The Aizu festival is a celebration of the time of the samurai. It begins with a display of sword dancing and fighting, and is followed by a procession of around five hundred people. The people in the procession carry flags and tools representing well-known feudal lords of long ago, and some are actually dressed like the lords themselves.

- Taimatsu Akashi Fire Festival

A reflection of a long ago time of war, the Taimatsu Akashi Festival consists of men and women carrying large symbolic torches lit with a sacred fire to the top of Mt. Gorozan. Accompanied by drummers, the torchbearers reach the top and light a wooden frame representing an old local castle and the samurai that lived there. In more recent years the festival has been opened up so that anyone wanting to participate may carry a small symbolic torch along with the procession.

- Iizaka's Fighting Festival (けんか祭り, Kenka Matsuri) is held in October
- Nihonmatsu's Lantern Festival (提灯祭り, Chōchin Matsuri) is held from October 4 to 6
- Nihonmatsu's Chrysanthemum doll exhibition (二本松の菊人形, Nihonmatsu no Kiku Ningyō) is held from October 1 to November 23
- Kōriyama City's Uneme Festival (うねめ祭り) is held early August in honor of the legend of Princess Uneme. The festival features a large parade through the city center with thousands of contestants annually, with several festival floats and a giant taiko-drum.
- Date City's Ryozen Taiko Festival (霊山太鼓祭り) is held in August and features multiple troupes of taiko drum players as well as other musical and comedic performances.

== Education ==
=== Universities ===
- Aizuwakamatsu
  - Aizu University
- Fukushima
  - Fukushima Gakuin University
  - Fukushima Medical University
  - Fukushima University
- Iwaki
  - Higashi Nippon International University
  - Iwaki Meisei University
- Koriyama
  - Koriyama Women's University
  - Nihon University – Koriyama campus
  - Ohu University

== Tourism ==
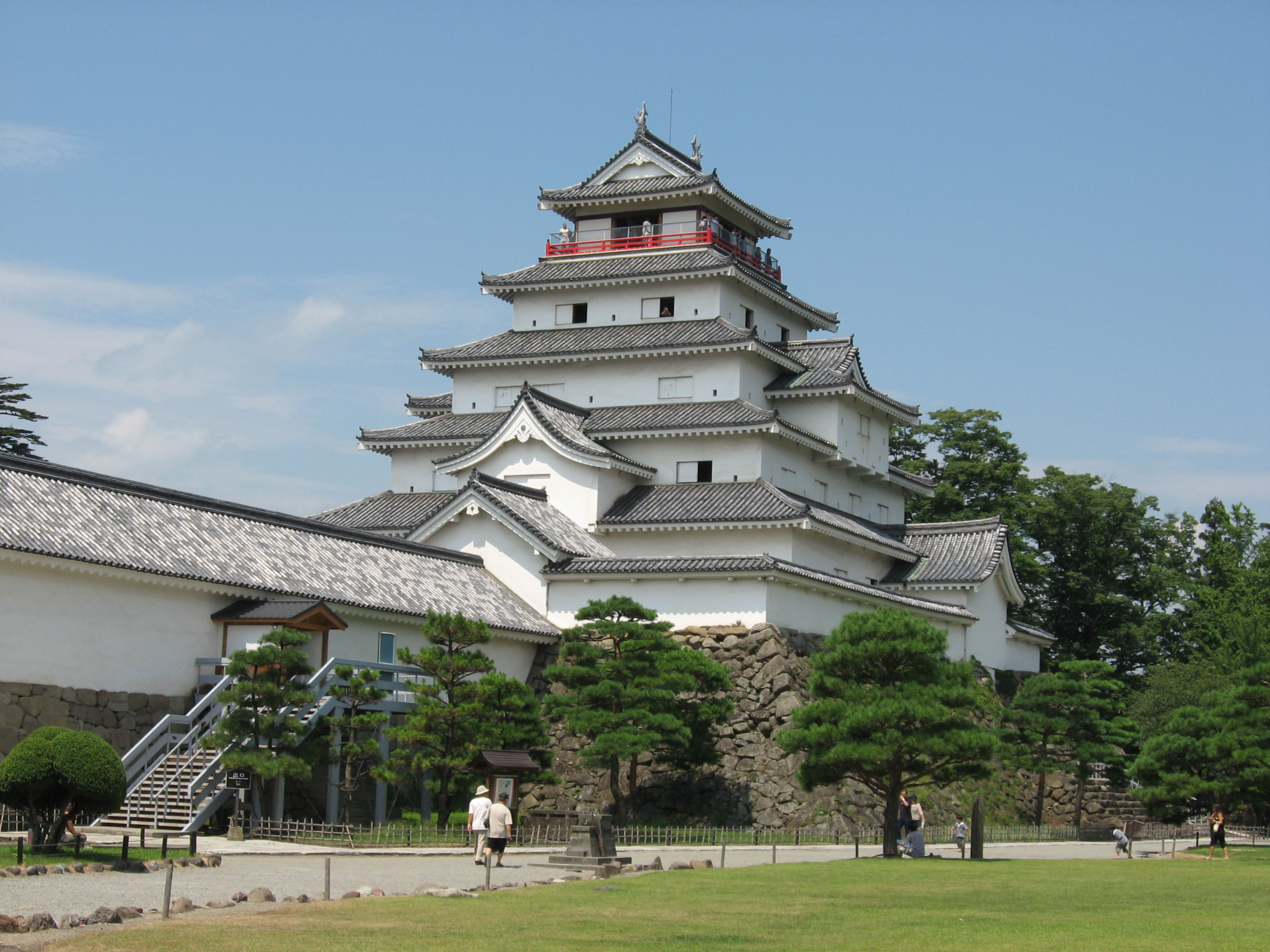
Aizuwakamatsu Castle

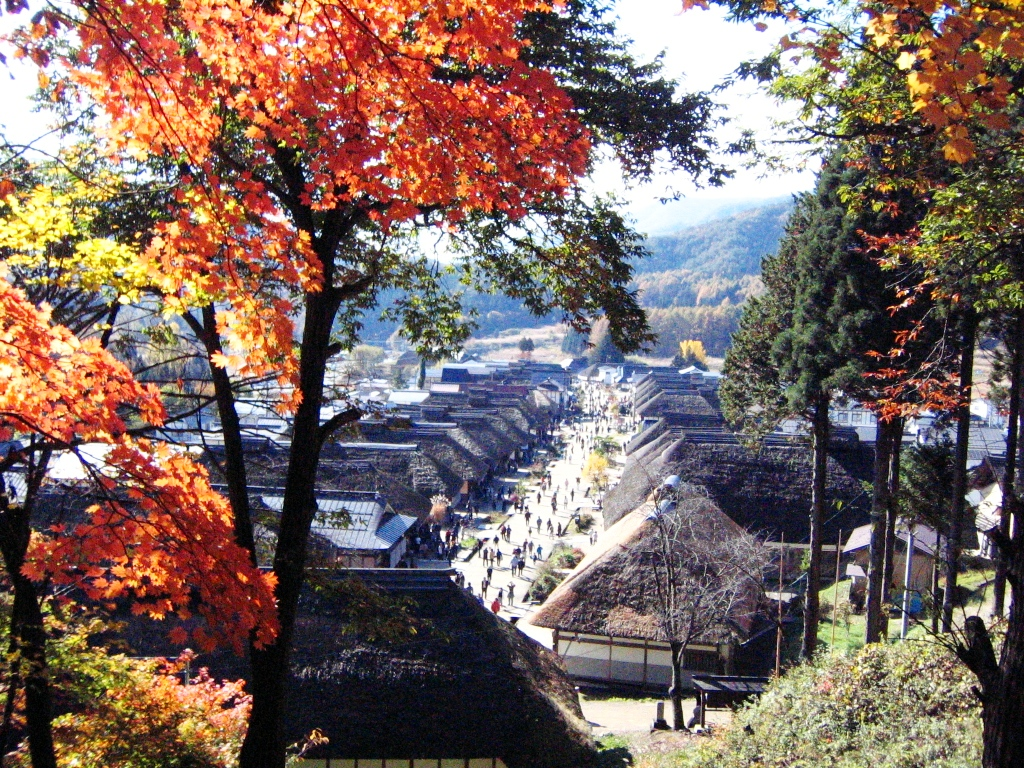
Ōuchi-juku

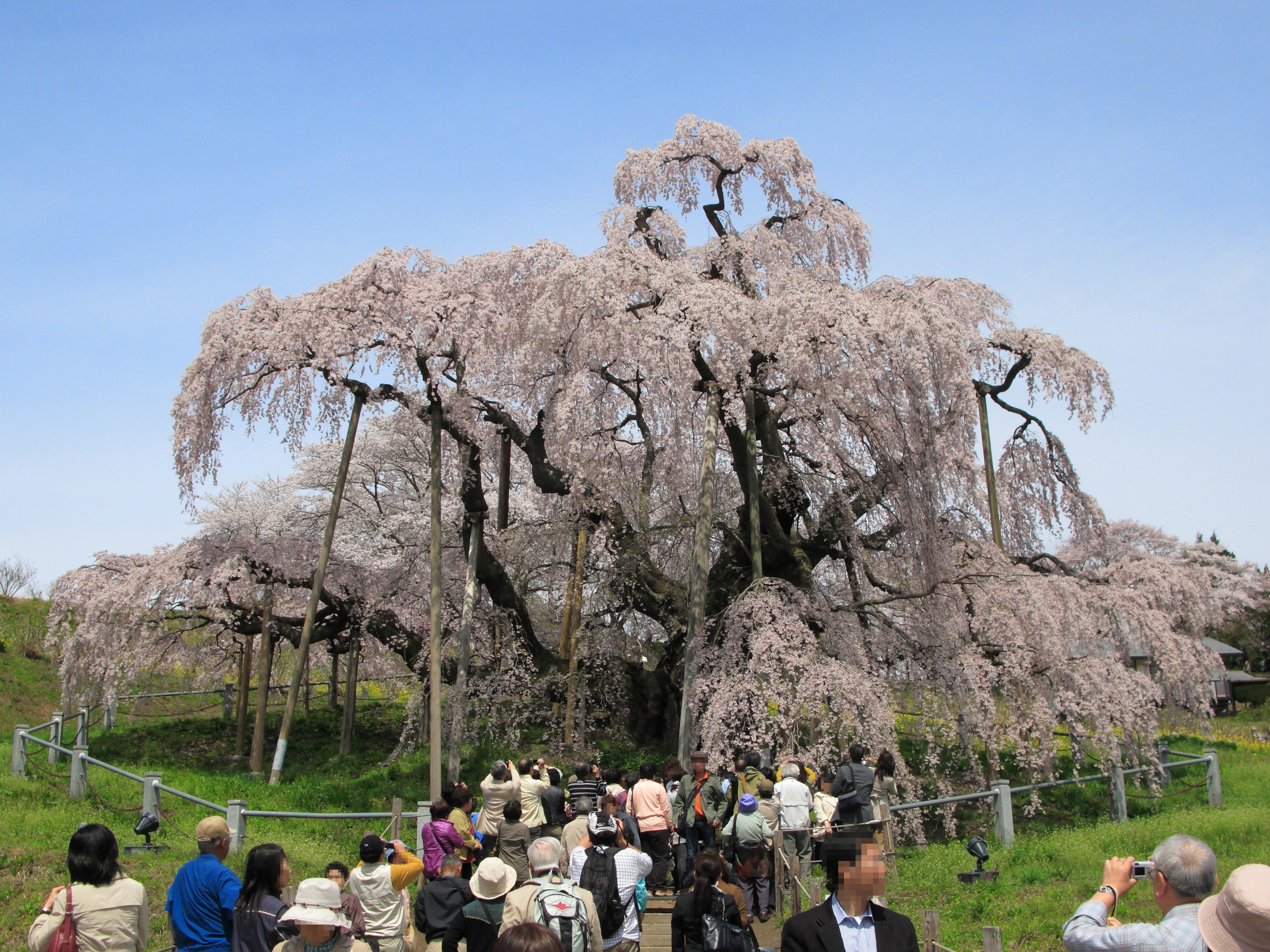
Miharu Takizakura is an ancient cherry tree in Miharu, Fukushima.

Tsuruga castle, a samurai castle originally built in the late 14th century, was occupied by the region's governor in the mid-19th century, during a time of war and governmental instability. Because of this, Aizuwakamatsu was the site of an important battle in the Boshin War, during which 19 teenage members of the Byakkotai committed ritual seppuku suicide. Their graves on Mt. Iimori are a popular tourist attraction.

Kitakata is well known for its distinctive Kitakata ramen noodles and well-preserved traditional storehouse buildings, while Ōuchi-juku in the town of Shimogo retains numerous thatched buildings from the Edo period.

Mount Bandai, in the Bandai-Asahi National Park, erupted in 1888, creating a large crater and numerous lakes, including the picturesque 'Five Coloured Lakes' (Goshiki-numa). Bird watching crowds are not uncommon during migration season here. The area is popular with hikers and skiers. Guided snowshoe tours are also offered in the winter.

The Inawashiro Lake area of Bandai-Asahi National Park is Inawashiro-ko, where the parental home of Hideyo Noguchi (1876–1928) can still be found. It was preserved along with some of Noguchi's belongings and letters as part of a memorial. Noguchi is famous not only for his research on yellow fever, but also for having his face on the 1,000 yen note.

The Miharu Takizakura is an ancient weeping higan cherry tree in Miharu, Fukushima. It is over 1,000 years old.

== Food ==
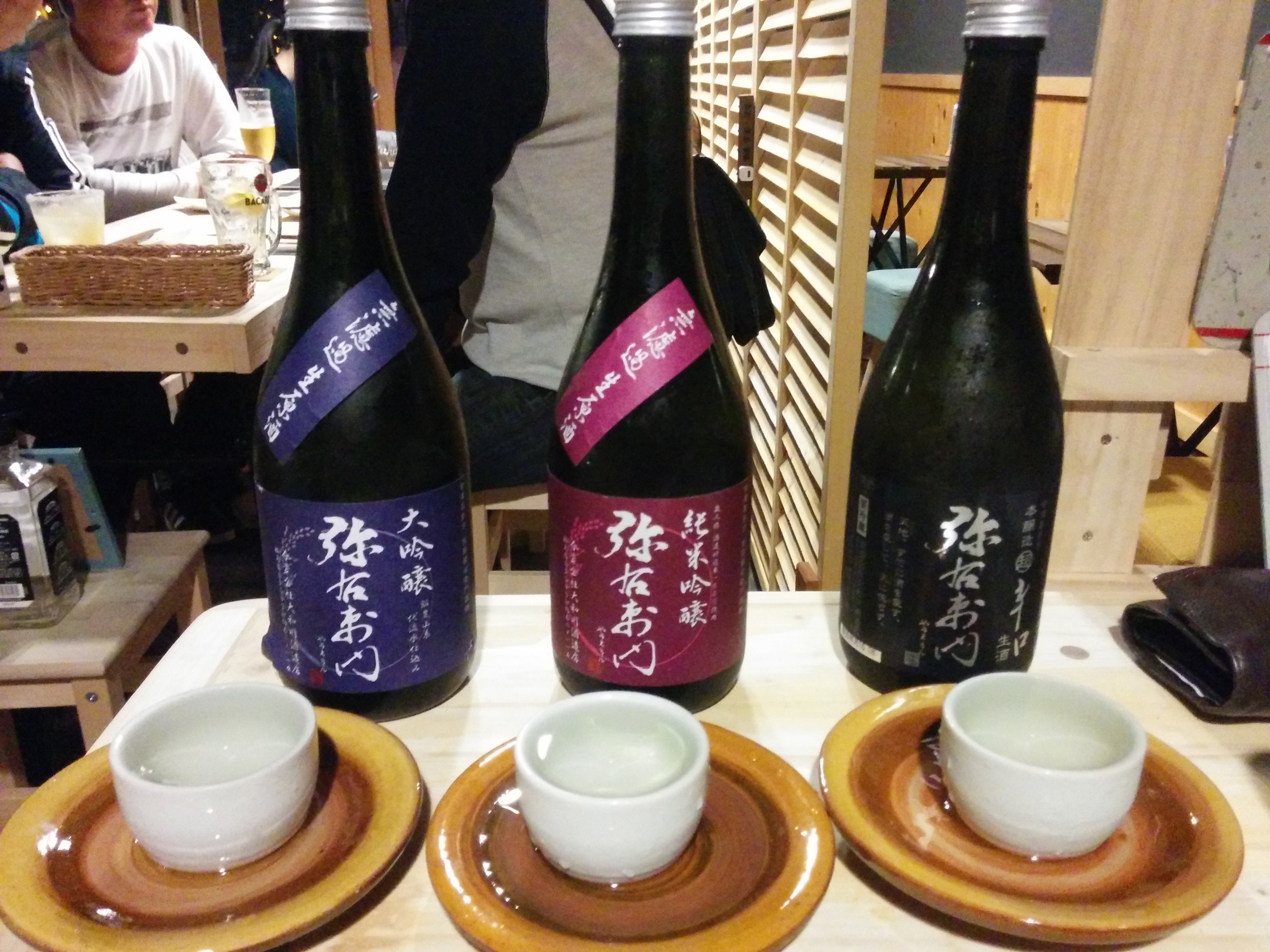
A sample set of Aizu sake

Fruits. Fukushima is known as a "Fruit Kingdom" because of its many seasonal fruits, and the fact that there is fruit being harvested every month of the year. While peaches are the most famous, the prefecture also produces large quantities of cherries, nashi (Japanese pears), grapes, persimmons, and apples.

Fukushima-Gyu is the prefecture's signature beef. The Japanese Black type cattle used to make Fukushima-Gyu are fed, raised, and processed within the prefecture. Only beef with a grade of 2 or 3 can be labeled as "Fukushima-Gyu" (福島牛)

Ikaninjin is shredded carrot and dried squid seasoned with soy sauce, cooking sake, mirin, etc. It is a local cuisine from the northern parts of Fukushima Prefecture. It is primarily made from the late autumn to winter in the household.

Kitakata Ramen is one of the Top 3 Ramen of Japan, along with Sapporo and Hakata. The base is a soy-sauce soup, as historically soy sauce was readily available from the many storehouses around the town. Niboshi (sardines), tonkotsu (pig bones) and sometimes chicken and vegetables are boiled to make the stock. This is then topped with chashu (thinly sliced barbeque pork), spring onions, fermented bamboo shoots, and sometimes narutomaki, a pink and white swirl of cured fish cake.

Mamador is the prefecture's most famous confection. The baked good has a milky red bean flavor center wrapped in a buttery dough. The name means “People who drink mothers’ milk" in Spanish. It is produced by the Sanmangoku Company.

Creambox is prefecture's second famous confection. It is a sweet bread with a thick milk bread and white milk-flavored cream. It is sold in Koriyama City at many bakery and school purchases . The selling price is usually around 100 yen, and in some rare cases, the dough is round. Since it looks simple and does not change much from normal bread when viewed from above, some processing may be performed on the cream, there are things that put almonds or draw the character's face with chocolate

Sake. The Fukushima Prefecture Sake Brewers Cooperative is made up of nearly 60 sake breweries. Additionally, the Annual Japan Sake Awards has awarded the prefecture the most gold prizes of all of Japan for four years running as of 2016.

== Transportation ==
=== Rail ===
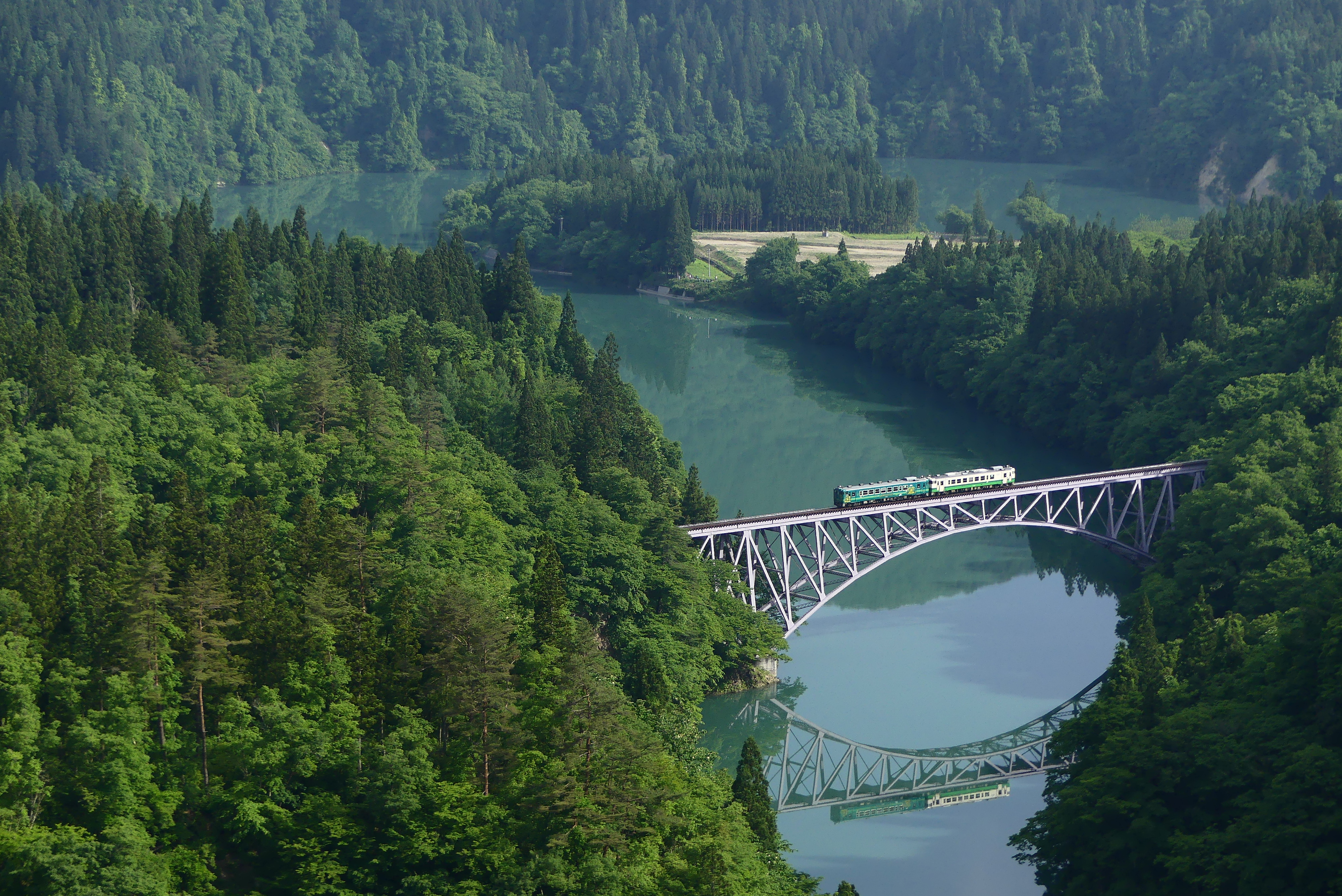
JR Tadami Line

- AbukumaExpress
  - Abukuma Express Line
- Aizu Railway
  - Aizu Line
- Fukushima Transportation
  - Iizaka Line
- JR East
  - Ban'etsu East Line
  - Ban'etsu West Line
  - Jōban Line
  - Suigun Line
  - Tadami Line
  - Tōhoku Line
  - Tōhoku Shinkansen
  - Yamagata Line
  - Yamagata Shinkansen
- Yagan Railway
  - Kinugawa Line

=== Road ===
==== Expressways ====
- Ban-etsu Expressway
- Jōban Expressway
- Tōhoku Expressway
- Tōhoku-Chūō Expressway

==== National highways ====
- National Route 4
- National Route 6
- National Route 13 (Fukushima-Yamagata-Shinjo-Yokote-Akita)
- National Route 49
- National Route 113 (Niigata-Murakami-Nagai-Nanyo-Shiroishi-Soma)
- National Route 114
- National Route 115 (Soma-Fukushima-Inawashiro)
- National Route 118
- National Route 121
- National Route 252
- National Route 288
- National Route 289 (Niigata-Tsubame-Uonuma-Tadami-Shirakawa-Iwaki)
- National Route 294
- National Route 349 (Mito-Hitachiota-Iwaki-Tamura-Nihonmatsu-Date-Shibata)
- National Route 352
- National Route 399
- National Route 400
- National Route 401 (Niigata-Agano-Kitakata-Fukushima-Namie)
- National Route 459

=== Ports ===
- Onahama Port – International and domestic goods, container hub port in Iwaki

=== Airports ===
- Fukushima Airport

== Notable people ==
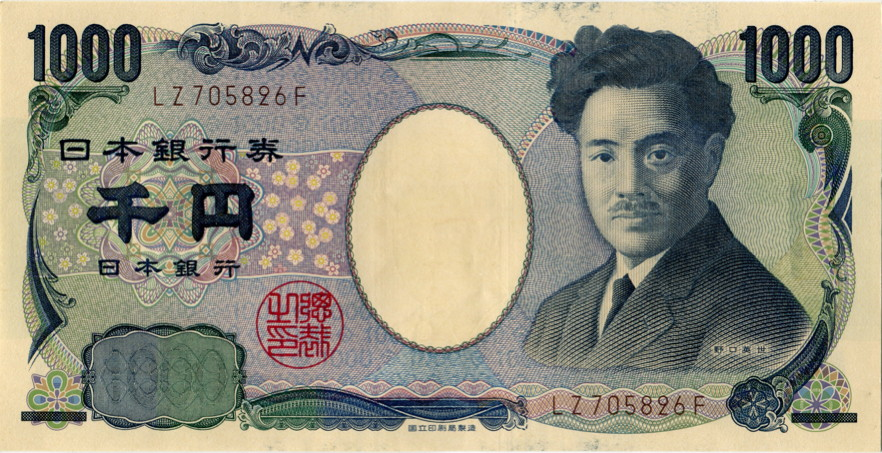
Hideyo Noguchi on the Series E 1K Yen banknote

- Junko Tabei, the first woman to reach the summit of Mount Everest, and the first woman to ascend all Seven Summits by climbing the highest peak on every continent
- Takeshi Suzuki, an alpine skier and Paralympic athlete.
- Yoshihide Muroya, an aerobatics pilot and race pilot
- Toshiyuki Nishida, an actor best known for his fishing comedy series, Tsuribaka Nisshi ("The Fishing Maniac's Diary")
- Wakatakakage Atsushi, a professional sumo wrestler competing in sumo's top makuuchi division beginning in 2019.
- Wakamotoharu Minato, Wakatakakage's brother and also top division rikishi.
- Mazie K. Hirono, US Senator and former Lieutenant Governor for Hawaii, was born in Fukushima Prefecture in 1947, and moved to Hawaii in 1955
- Hideyo Noguchi, the doctor who contributed to knowledge in the fight against syphilis and yellow fever. The Japanese government created the Hideyo Noguchi Africa Prize in his honor. This was first awarded in May 2008
- Seishiro Okazaki (January 28, 1890 – July 12, 1951) was a Japanese American healer, martial artist, and founder of Danzan-ryū jujitsu. Born in Kakeda, Date County in Fukushima Prefecture, Japan, he immigrated to Hawaii in 1906
- Nahoko Takada (高田なほ子, 1905–1991), Japanese educator, trade unionist, politician, socialist and peace activist
- Nasubi, a comedian and media personality best known for appearing on the controversial reality television show Susunu! Denpa Shōnen.

== See also ==
- 2006 Fukushima gubernatorial election
- Umbilical Cord (Fukushima) - panhandle in Kitakata, Fukushima
