= 2006 Fukushima gubernatorial election =

Fukushima held a gubernatorial election on November 12, 2006. Yuhei Sato, supported by the DPJ and SDP was re-elected.

== Results ==
Gubernatorial election 2006: Fukushima
Party	Candidate	Votes	%	±%
DPJ, SDP	Yuhei Satō (佐藤 雄平)	497,171		
LDP, NKP	Masako Mori (森 雅子)	395,950		
JCP	Hideo Ogawa (小川 英雄)	38,457		
Independent	Masanari Kawada (川田 昌成)	23,113		
Independent	Yoshishige Takahashi (高橋 喜重)	10,598		
Turnout			58.77%	

== Sources ==
- (in Japanese) Official results
- (in Japanese) ザ･選挙 -選挙情報-
