= Ōyasuba Kofun group =

Ōyasuba Kofun
- 大塚山古墳 (Japanese)
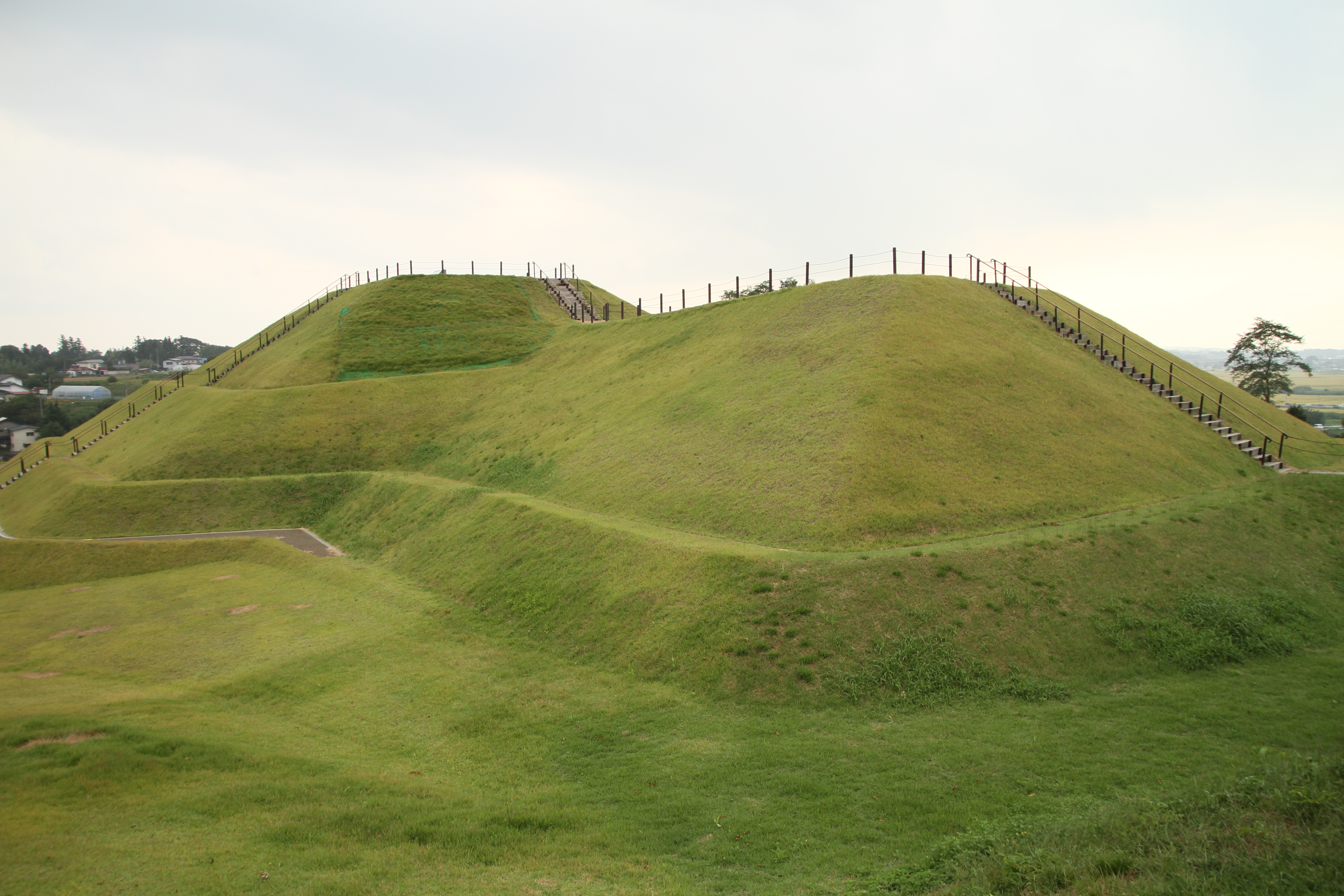

- Ōyasuba Kofun Ōyasuba Kofun group (Japan)
- 37°21′23″N 140°24′12″E
- Type: Kofun
- Periods: Kofun period
- Location: Kōriyama, Fukushima, Japan
- Region: Tōhoku region

History
- Built: late 4th, early 5th century AD

Site notes
- Excavation dates: 1996-1998
- Public access: Yes (archaeological park)

The Ōyasuba Kofun cluster (大安場古墳群, Ōyasuba Kofun gun) is a group of five early to middle Kofun period megalithic tumuli located in what is now part of the town of Kōriyama, Fukushima in the southern Tōhoku region of Japan. The largest of the tumuli at the site was designated a National Historic Site of Japan in 2000.

== Overview ==
The site is located on the east side of the Abukuma River, which flows through from the south to the north, at an altitude of about 250 meters. Discovered in 1991, the Koriyama City Board of Education conducted an excavation study from 1996 to 1998.

The largest tumulus is a zenpō-kōhō-fun (前方後方墳) with the form of "two conjoined rectangles". It has a length of 83 meters and is orientated in a north-south direction. It was constructed by partly cutting out the natural hill next to the tumulus, with three tiers in the rear and two in the front. A large amount of red-colored pot-shaped Sue ware with a hole in the bottom was excavated from the slopes of the mound, and it was likely that these were originally kept on top of the mound. The interior has a clay-floored burial chamber with a length of 10 meters and width of two meters, containing a 9.2 meter long tree-coffin. The tomb had a large quantity of grave goods, including swords, spears, sickles, fragments of armor as well as jewelry, which date the construction to around the second half of the 4th century

The remaining four empun (円墳)-style circular domed kofun have a diameter of approximately 15 meters each but were not well preserved. They are believed to date from the late 5th century and to be the tombs of the leaders of a nearby settlement.

The site is open to the public as an archaeological park, and is located a ten minute walk from the Kanaya bus stop on the Fukushima Kotsu bus from JR East Koriyama Station.

== See also ==
- List of Historic Sites of Japan (Fukushima)
