= Nahoko Takada =

Japanese educator and politician (1905–1991)

- 高田なほ子
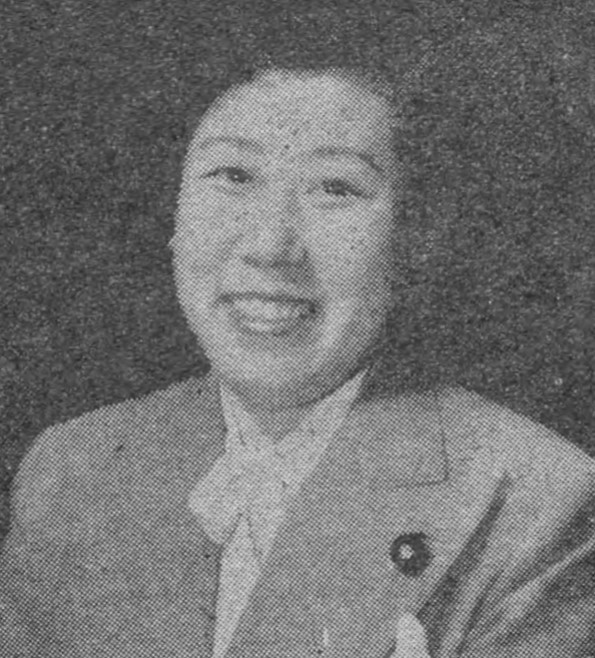
- Nahoko Takada in 1955
- Born: 1905; Fukushima, Empire of Japan
- Died: 19 May 1991 (aged 86); Japan
- Education: Fukushima Prefectural Women's Normal School
- Occupations: educator, trade unionist, politician, socialist and peace activist
- Political party: Japanese Socialist Party
- Awards: Order of the Sacred Treasure, Second Class

Nahoko Takada (Japanese: 高田なほ子, romanized: Takada Nahoko; née Watanabee, 18 January 1905 – 19 May 1991) was a Japanese educator, trade unionist, politician, socialist and peace activist.

== Biography ==
Takada was born on 18 January 1905 in Fukushima in the Empire of Japan. She was the third daughter of judge Akira Watanabe and his wife Toyo.

Takada became a member of the Japanese Socialist Party when it was founded in November 1945. She rose to become head of the women's section of the Party.

Takada trained as a teacher at Fukushima Prefectural Women's Normal School, graduating in 1922. She first taught in Fukushima, then moved to teach in Tokyo in 1924. Takada became the first female director of the Japanese Teachers' Union after World War II. She argued against police abuses of the law and undue prosecution against student activists under the Subversive Activities Prevention Law.

In April 1947, Takada was elected to the Shinagawa Ward Assembly in Tokyo, where she served until 1950. In 1950, she was elected to the House of Councillors. She served two terms as a member of the House of Councillors and was chair of the Committee on Judicial Affairs.

In March 1952, Takada argued before the Japanese Diet against the continued United States military presence which was due to remain after the Allied occupation of Japan came to an end in April 1952, regardless of the formalities of international law and the Treaty of San Francisco. She argued that this was evidence of Japan's comprised sovereignty and that this would allow US military personnel to commit crimes that could not be punished under Japanese law, such as rape.

Takada argued before a plenary session of the House of Representatives (the lower house of the Japanese Diet) on 9 May 1956 that the Japanese government should demonstrate a model of sexual morals for the nation, which had "declined" after "Allied troops had been stationed in Japan." She spoke against the "social vice" of prostitution and geisha, campaigning to pass the Anti-Prostitution Law.

After retiring from politics, Takada was chair of the Japanese Women's Conference [ja]. Takada was also a pacifist and was one of five Japanese representatives to attend a Women's International Democratic Federation (WIDF) meeting on 22 February 1955 in Geneva, Switzerland. At the meeting the Japanese delegates raised concerns about the global nuclear arms race and warned against forgetting the events of World War II. Takada also attended an executive meeting of WIDF held in Berlin, Germany.

In the 1970s, Takada was elected chair of the National Liaison Council of Retired Women Teachers and Staff. In 1975, she was awarded the Order of the Sacred Treasure, Second Class.

Takada died on 19 May 1991, aged 86.
