= List of Natural Monuments of Japan (Aomori) =

This list is of the Natural Monuments of Japan within the Prefecture of Aomori.

== National Natural Monuments ==
As of 1 April 2021, twenty Natural Monuments have been designated, including two *Special Natural Monuments; Lake Towada-Oirase River and the northernmost Native Zone of the Japanese camellia span the prefectural borders with Akita.

Monument	Municipality	Comments	Image	Coordinates	Type	Ref.
*Japanese serow Capricornis crispus カモシカ; Kamoshika		designated across thirty prefectures			1.1	
*Swans of Kominato and their Visitation Grounds 小湊のハクチョウおよびその渡来地; Kominato no hakuchō oyobi sono torai-chi	Hiranai			40°56′14″N 140°58′13″E	1.2	
Japanese macaques of the Shimokita Peninsula and the northernmost Limit of their Habitat; Macaca fuscata 下北半島のサルおよびサル生息北限地; Shimokita hantō no saru oyobi saru seisoku hokugen-chi	Mutsu, Sai			41°11′39″N 140°46′10″E	1.1	
Japanese dormouse Glirulus japonicus ヤマネ; Yamane		found in Honshū, Shikoku, and Kyūshū			1.1	
Golden eagle Aquila chrysaetos イヌワシ; Inuwashi					1.2	
White-tailed eagle Haliaeetus albicilla オジロワシ; Ojirowashi					1.2	
Steller's sea eagle Haliaeetus pelagicus オオワシ; Ōwashi					1.2	
Brent goose Branta bernicla コクガン; Kokugan					1.2	
Bean goose Anser fabalis ヒシクイ; Hishikui					1.2	
Greater white-fronted goose Anser albifrons マガン; Magan					1.2	
Black woodpecker Dryocopus martius クマゲラ; Kumagera					1.2	
Koeyoshidori; Gallus gallus domesticus 声良鶏; Koeyoshidori					1.4	
Shamo; Gallus gallus domesticus 軍鶏; Shamo					1.4	
Kabushima Black-tailed gull Breeding Grounds; Larus crassirostris 蕪島ウミネコ繁殖地; Kabushima umineko hanshoku-chi	Hachinohe			40°32′22″N 141°33′28″E	1.2	
Kitakanegasawa Ginkgo; Ginkgo biloba 北金ヶ沢のイチョウ; Kitakanegasawa no ichō	Fukaura			40°44′57″N 140°05′21″E	2.1	
Mount Nuidōishi and its Special Plant Communities; Macaca fuscata 縫道石山・縫道石の特殊植物群落; Nuidōishi-yama・Nuidō-ishi no tokushu shokubutsu gunraku	Sai			41°18′47″N 140°50′49″E	2.10	
Hōryō Ginkgo; Ginkgo biloba 法量のイチョウ; Hōryō no ichō	Towada			40°35′13″N 141°01′04″E	2.1	
Hotoke-ga-ura 仏宇多（仏ヶ浦） Hotoke-uta (Hotoke-ga-ura)	Sai	also a Place of Scenic Beauty		41°18′24″N 140°48′13″E		
Lake Towada-Oirase River 十和田湖および奥入瀬渓流; Towada-ko oyobi Oirase-keiryū	Towada	also a Special Place of Scenic Beauty; designation includes an area of Kosaka in Akita Prefecture		40°28′17″N 140°52′33″E		
Northernmost Native Zone of the Japanese camellia Camellia japonica ツバキ自生北限地帯; Tsubaki jisei hokugen chitai	Hiranai	designation includes an area of Oga in Akita Prefecture		40°54′41″N 140°59′56″E		

April 2021

== Prefectural Natural Monuments ==
As of 12 November 2020, forty Natural Monuments have been designated at a prefectural level.

== Municipal Natural Monuments ==
As of 1 May 2020, one hundred and seventy-two Natural Monuments have been designated at a municipal level.

== See also ==
- Cultural Properties of Japan
- Parks and gardens in Aomori Prefecture
- List of Places of Scenic Beauty of Japan (Aomori)
- List of Historic Sites of Japan (Aomori)
