= Taijima =

Set of islands in Aomori Prefecture, Japan

鯛島
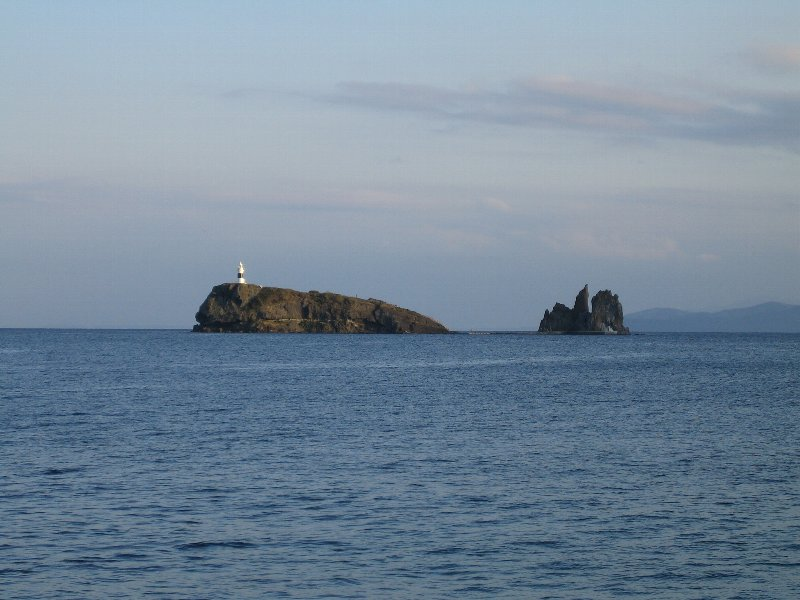
- Taijima as seen from Ushinokubi Cape

- Location within Aomori Prefecture

Geography
- Location: Mutsu Bay
- Coordinates: 41°07′12.9″N 140°48′52.7″E
- Area: 0.016 km^{2} (0.0062 sq mi)
- Coastline: 0.4 km (0.25 mi)

Administration
- Japan
- Prefecture: Aomori Prefecture
- Municipality: Mutsu

Taijima (Japanese: 鯛島) is an uninhabited set of rocky islands off the coast of the Shimokita Peninsula in Mutsu Bay. The island is a part of the city of Mutsu in Aomori Prefecture. The island has 0.4 kilometers (0.25 mi) of coastline and an area of 0.016 square kilometers (0.0062 sq mi). It is a part of the prefecture-managed, Shimokita Hantō Quasi-National Park.

== Geography ==
Taijima is a set of two islands located about 1 kilometer (0.62 mi) off the coast of the Shimokita Peninsula in Mutsu Bay. Administratively, the islands are part of the former village of Wakinosawa that is now part of the city of Mutsu. During the village's existence, the island was often used a symbol of the municipality. The name Taijima is derived from the islands' appearance of a Red seabream swimming along the surface of the water. The islands are referred to as the body and tail of the fish. The body island is covered with green, but the tail is stained white from the droppings of seabirds on its steep rocky surface. The waters surrounding Taijima are designated as a protected marine park. In addition to this marine park, the islands are included in the larger prefecture-managed, Shimokita Hantō Quasi-National Park.

== Human history ==
Though the island is uninhabited, a shrine to Benzaiten has existed on the island since the Heian period. A legend holds that a lover of the Heian period shōgun Sakanoue no Tamuramaro was left behind on the island after the conclusion of his campaign to conquer the Emishi. After slipping slowly into madness, she perished on the island, where she was buried by the local people. A lighthouse was built on the body island, entering service on 22 January 1945.

The island gained protection after the creation of Shimokita Hantō Quasi-National Park on 22 July 1968. In 1979 the central section of the island collapsed into the sea, dividing the island into the two smaller islands that are extant. In 1997 work was conducted by the prefectural government of Aomori to prevent further deterioration of the islands.
