= Ōmazaki Lighthouse =

Ōmazaki Lighthouse 大間埼灯台
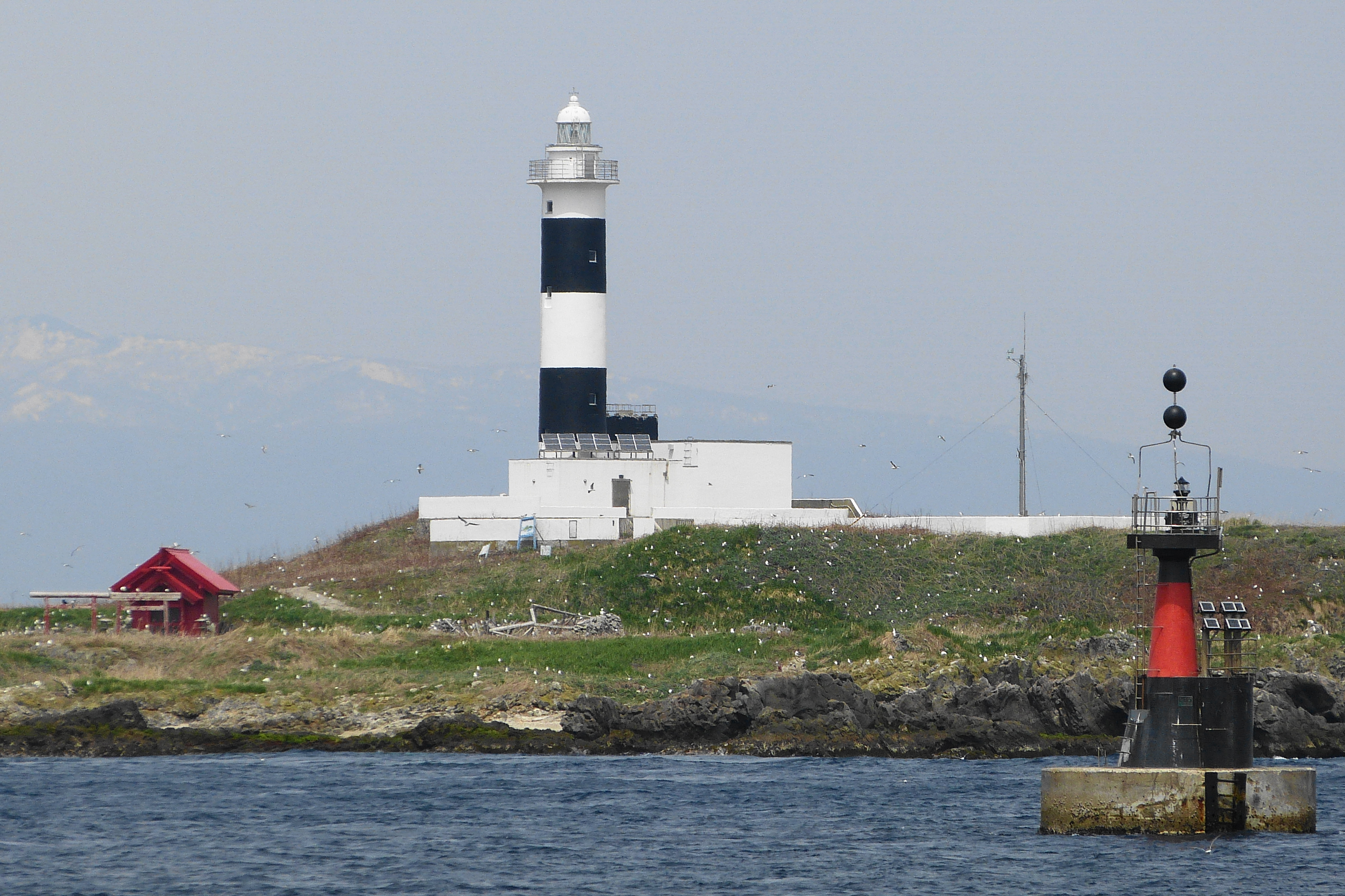
- Ōmazaki Lighthouse
- Location: Ōma, Aomori Prefecture, Japan
- Coordinates: 41.5546°N 140.9116°E

Tower
- Constructed: 1921 (first)
- Foundation: concrete base
- Construction: concrete tower
- Automated: 1991
- Height: 25.4 metres (83 ft)
- Shape: cylibdrical tower with balcony and lantern
- Markings: white and black bands tower, white lantern
- Fog signal: one 10s. blast every 50s.

Light
- First lit: 1953 (current)
- Focal height: 36 metres (118 ft)
- Lens: Fourth Order Fresnel
- Intensity: 120,000 candela
- Range: 17 nautical miles (31 km; 20 mi)
- Characteristic: Fl (3) W 30s
- Japan no.: JCG-1550

The Ōmazaki Lighthouse (大間埼灯台, Ōmazaki tōdai) is a lighthouse located at the northernmost extremity of the Shimokita Peninsula of Honshū island in Ōma, Aomori Prefecture, Japan. It is maintained by the Japan Coast Guard.

The lighthouse is located on a small offshore island called Bentenjima, 600 meters off Cape Ōmazaki, within the borders of the Shimokita Hantō Quasi-National Park. There is no public access.

The Ōmazaki Lighthouse illuminates the Tsugaru Strait at the entrance to Mutsu Bay. This is the narrowest point on the Tsugaru Strait and the light from this lighthouse can be seen across the strait in Hokkaido.

== History ==
Work on the Ōmazaki Lighthouse began in September 1920, and it was first lit on November 1, 1921. During World War II, it was repeatedly hit by air strikes from United States Navy aircraft. By 1945 it lay in ruins.

While being rebuilt after the war, it was once again severely damaged by the 1952 Hokkaido earthquake. The second generation lighthouse was completed in July 1953. A radar beacon was established on April 17, 1983. Since April 1, 1993, the lighthouse has been fully automated, and is now unmanned. The lighthouse is maintained by the Japan Coast Guard.

It is listed as one of the “50 Lighthouses of Japan” by the Japan Lighthouse Association.

== See also ==
- List of lighthouses in Japan
