= Ōma =

Ōma 大間町
- Town
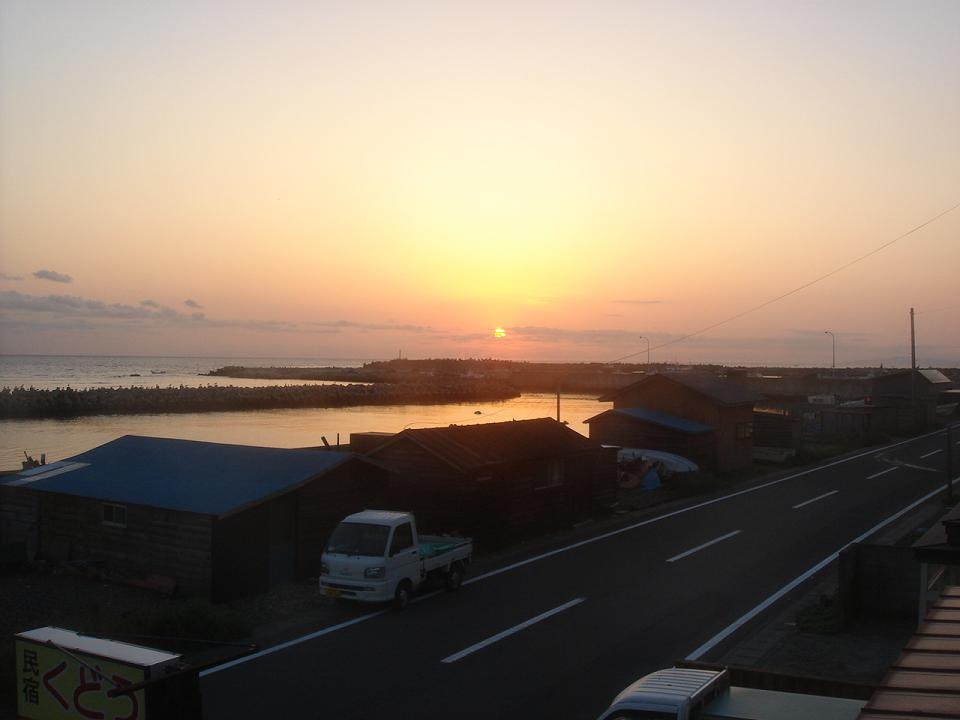
- Sunrise in Ōma

- Flag Seal
- Location of Ōma in Aomori Prefecture

- Coordinates: 41°31′20″N 140°54′18″E
- Country: Japan
- Region: Tōhoku
- Prefecture: Aomori
- District: Shimokita

Area
  - Total: 52.09 km^{2} (20.11 sq mi)

Population (December 31, 2025)
  - Total: 4,565
  - Density: 87.64/km^{2} (227.0/sq mi)
- Time zone: UTC+9 (Japan Standard Time)
- Phone number: 0175-37-2111
- Address: 104 Ōma, Ōma-machi, Shimokita-gun, Aomori-ken 039-4692
- Climate: Cfb
- Website: Official website
- Symbols
- Bird: Common gull
- Flower: Rosa rugosa
- Tree: Japanese black pine

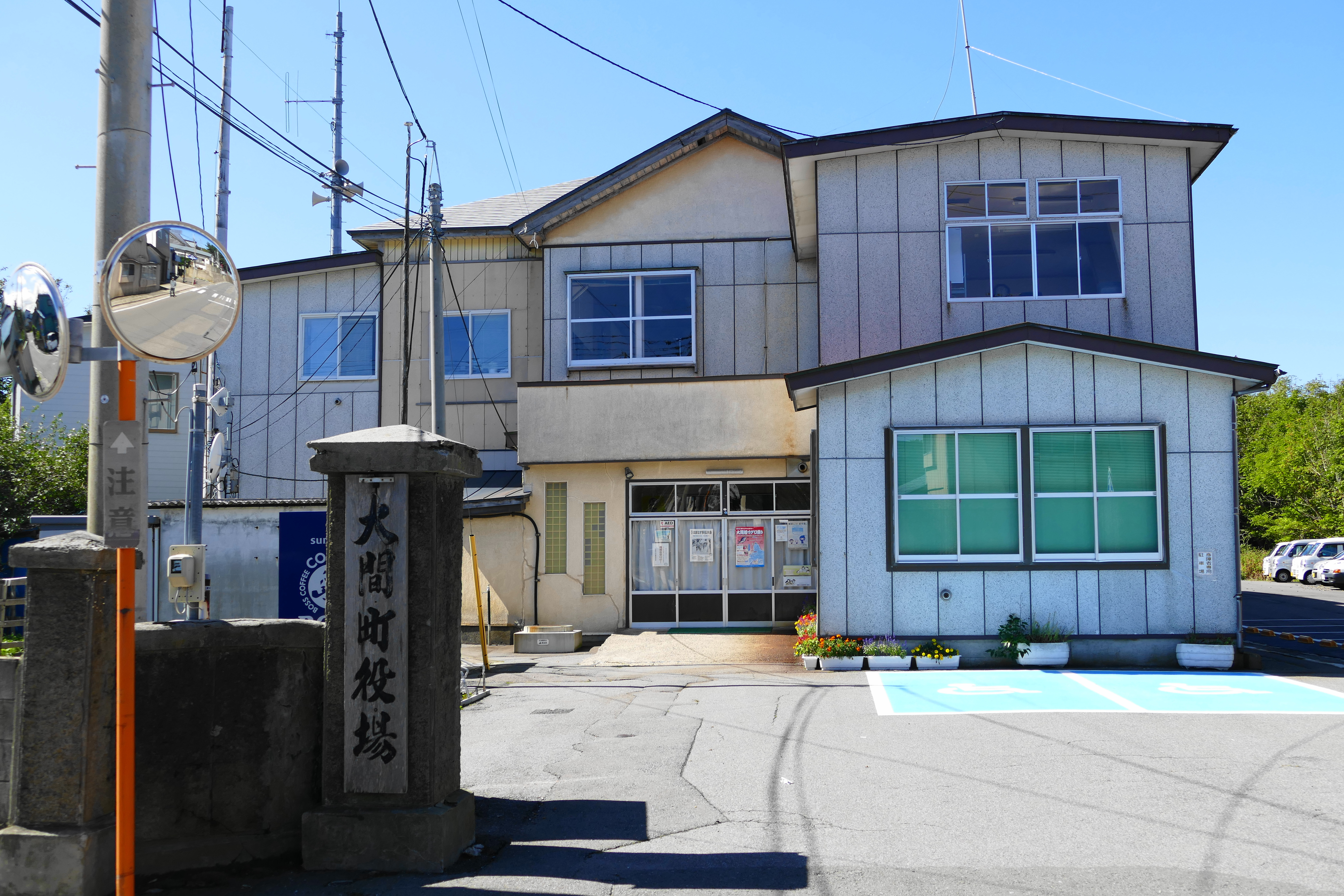
Ōma town hall

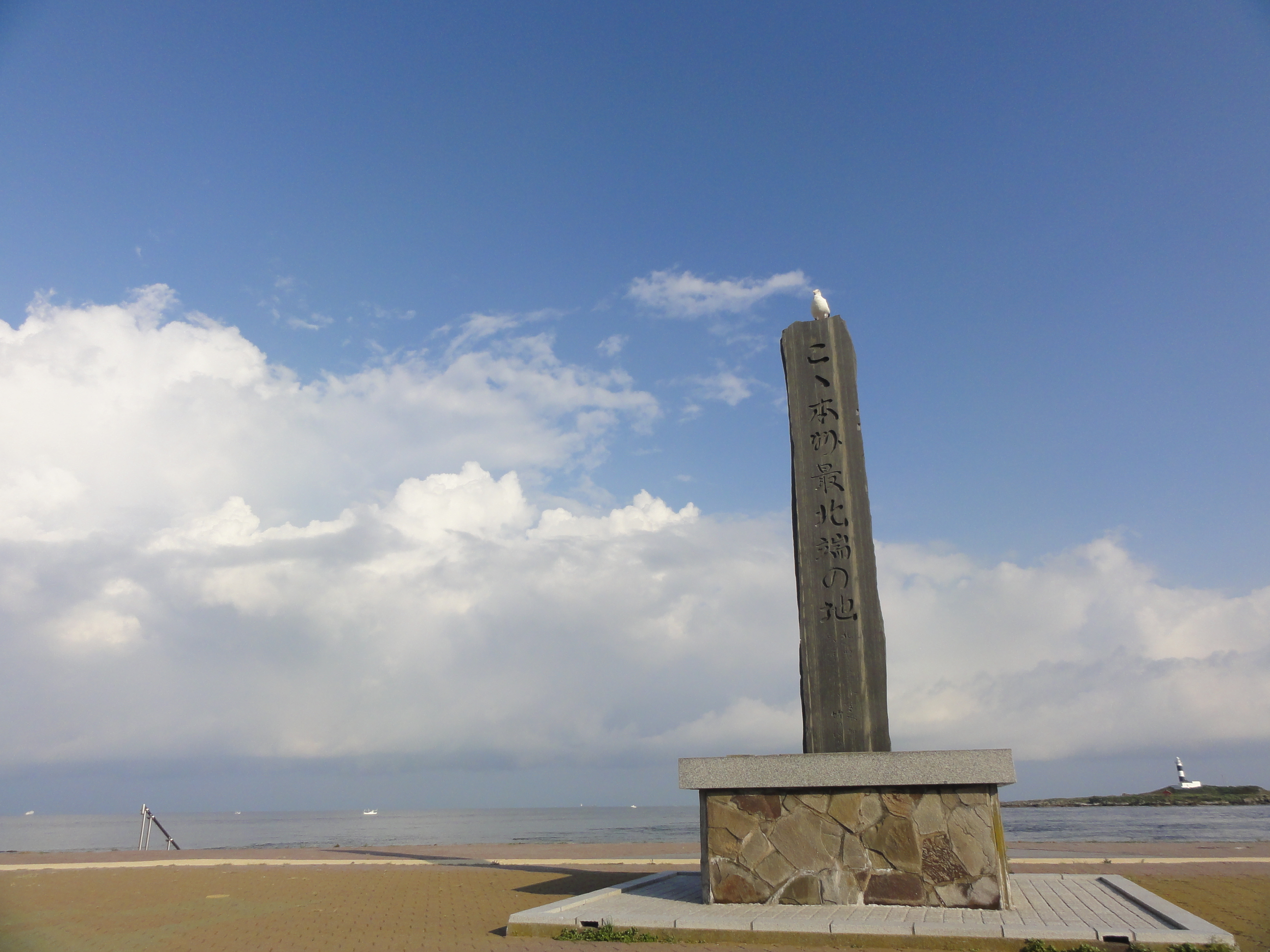
Monument at the northernmost point of Honshū (Omazaki)

Ōma (大間町, Ōma-machi) is a town located in Shimokita District, Aomori Prefecture, Japan. As of 31 December 2025, the town had an estimated population of 4,565 in 2,234 households, and a population density of 88 per square kilometre (230/sq mi). The total area of the town is 52.10 square kilometres (20.12 sq mi). It is the northernmost municipality on the island of Honshu.

== Geography ==
Ōma occupies the northwestern coastline of Shimokita Peninsula, facing the Tsugaru Strait, with Cape Shiokubi on the Kameda Peninsula in the Oshima region of Hokkaido 17.5 kilometers away. Cape Ōmazaki (大間崎) is the northernmost point on the island of Honshū. Most of the coastline is dominated by coastal terraces.The longest river is the Okuto River (8.7 km long), which originates from Mount Otaki. More than 70% of the town is national forest, about 25% is farmland and wilderness, and the total residential area is less than 1%. The town extends approximately 8 kilometers east-to-west and 15 kilometers north-to-south. Much of the town is within the limits of the Shimokita Hanto Quasi-National Park. In 2002, the Ministry of the Environment classified some tidal flats of the Ōma shoreline as one of the 500 Important Wetlands in Japan particularly for its biodiversity of marine flora, especially several varieties of kelp.

=== Neighbouring municipalities ===
Aomori Prefecture

- Kazamaura
- Mutsu
- Sai

=== Climate ===
The town has a climate characterized by cool short summers and long cold winters with strong winds (Köppen climate classification Cfb). The average annual temperature in Ōma is 10.2 °C (50.4 °F). The average annual rainfall is 1,158.2 mm (45.60 in) with August as the wettest month. The temperatures are highest on average in August, at around 21.7 °C (71.1 °F), and lowest in January, at around 0.0 °C (32.0 °F).

Climate data for Ōma (1991−2020 normals, extremes 1976−present)
Month	Jan	Feb	Mar	Apr	May	Jun	Jul	Aug	Sep	Oct	Nov	Dec	Year
Record high °C (°F)	12.0 (53.6)	14.9 (58.8)	17.3 (63.1)	21.1 (70.0)	25.8 (78.4)	26.8 (80.2)	32.5 (90.5)	32.9 (91.2)	32.6 (90.7)	25.2 (77.4)	22.0 (71.6)	15.6 (60.1)	32.6 (90.7)
Mean daily maximum °C (°F)	2.2 (36.0)	2.7 (36.9)	6.2 (43.2)	11.0 (51.8)	15.0 (59.0)	18.4 (65.1)	22.3 (72.1)	24.8 (76.6)	22.8 (73.0)	17.4 (63.3)	11.0 (51.8)	4.8 (40.6)	13.2 (55.8)
Daily mean °C (°F)	0.0 (32.0)	0.2 (32.4)	3.1 (37.6)	7.6 (45.7)	11.5 (52.7)	15.1 (59.2)	19.3 (66.7)	21.7 (71.1)	19.5 (67.1)	14.0 (57.2)	8.0 (46.4)	2.2 (36.0)	10.2 (50.3)
Mean daily minimum °C (°F)	−2.4 (27.7)	−2.3 (27.9)	0.0 (32.0)	4.1 (39.4)	8.5 (47.3)	12.4 (54.3)	16.9 (62.4)	19.1 (66.4)	16.0 (60.8)	10.3 (50.5)	4.8 (40.6)	−0.3 (31.5)	7.3 (45.1)
Record low °C (°F)	−10.2 (13.6)	−10.7 (12.7)	−8.2 (17.2)	−5.3 (22.5)	0.0 (32.0)	3.6 (38.5)	8.5 (47.3)	10.0 (50.0)	6.7 (44.1)	0.4 (32.7)	−5.4 (22.3)	−10.0 (14.0)	−10.7 (12.7)
Average precipitation mm (inches)	60.1 (2.37)	52.6 (2.07)	62.3 (2.45)	74.1 (2.92)	89.3 (3.52)	80.6 (3.17)	128.7 (5.07)	173.8 (6.84)	149.0 (5.87)	111.2 (4.38)	96.7 (3.81)	79.8 (3.14)	1,158.2 (45.60)
Average snowfall cm (inches)	65 (26)	76 (30)	36 (14)	1 (0.4)	0 (0)	0 (0)	0 (0)	0 (0)	0 (0)	0 (0)	1 (0.4)	29 (11)	208 (82)
Average rainy days (≥ 1.0 mm)	11.1	9.8	10.6	10.0	10.1	8.6	10.1	9.9	11.0	11.8	13.2	12.6	128.8
Average snowy days (≥ 3 cm)	9.2	10.1	4.8	0.1	0	0	0	0	0	0	0.1	4.2	28.5
Mean monthly sunshine hours	71.7	100.2	165.6	203.8	202.5	175.9	155.0	168.8	179.2	166.1	100.2	69.9	1,758.8
Source: Japan Meteorological Agency

== Demographics ==
According to Japanese census data, the population of Ōma has declined since 1960.

Historical population

Year	Pop.	±%
1920	4,077	—
1930	5,396	+32.4%
1940	6,054	+12.2%
1950	7,217	+19.2%
1960	7,983	+10.6%
1970	7,673	−3.9%

Year	Pop.	±%
1980	7,624	−0.6%
1990	7,125	−6.5%
2000	6,566	−7.8%
2010	6,340	−3.4%
2020	4,718	−25.6%

== History ==
The area around Ōma was inhabited by the Emishi people until the historical period. During the Edo period, it was controlled by the Nambu clan of Morioka Domain. During the post-Meiji restoration establishment of the modern municipalities system on 1 April 1889, Ōoku Village was proclaimed from the merger of Ōma hamlet with neighboring Okudo hamlet. It was renamed Ōma Town on 3 November 1942.

Ōma has been a popular location setting for movies and television dramas. It was the setting for the 1983 movie Gyōei no mure (魚影の群れ) starring Ken Ogata. In 2000, Ōma was the setting for an NHK television series Watashi no Aoi Sora (私の青空) starring Tabata Tomoko. This was followed by another fictional series Maguro (マグロ) on TV Asahi starring Tetsuya Watari in 2007.

== Government ==
Ōma has a mayor-council form of government with a directly elected mayor and a unicameral town council of ten members. Ōma is part of Shimokita District which, together with the city of Mutsu, contributes three members to the Aomori Prefectural Assembly. In terms of national politics, the town is part of Aomori 1st district of the lower house of the Diet of Japan.

== Economy ==
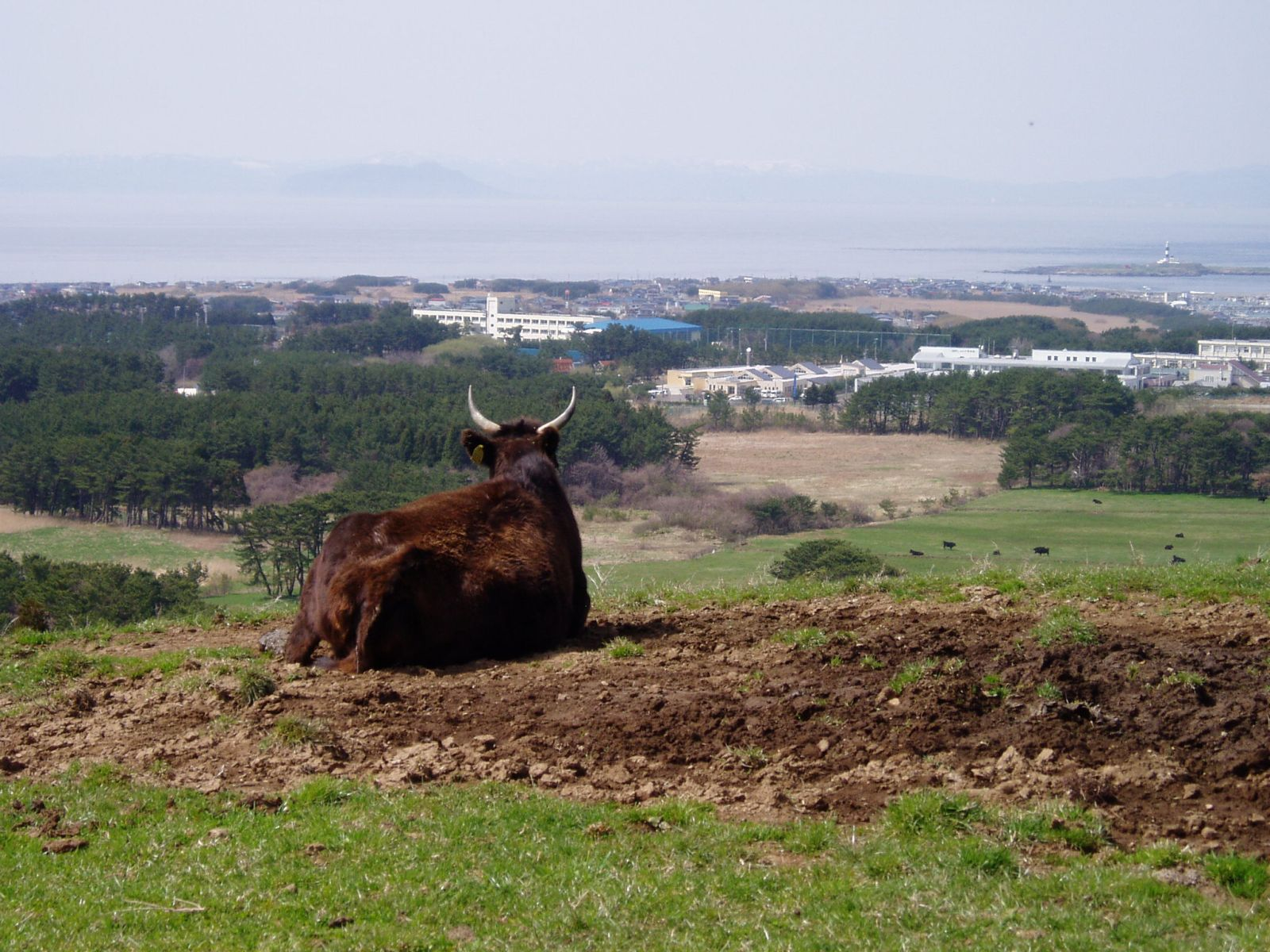
From the Observation Deck of Seaside Cattle Park Oma (Municipal Tourist Ranch), Oma Town, Tsugaru Strait, and Hokkaido can be seen. The central school building is Oma High School.

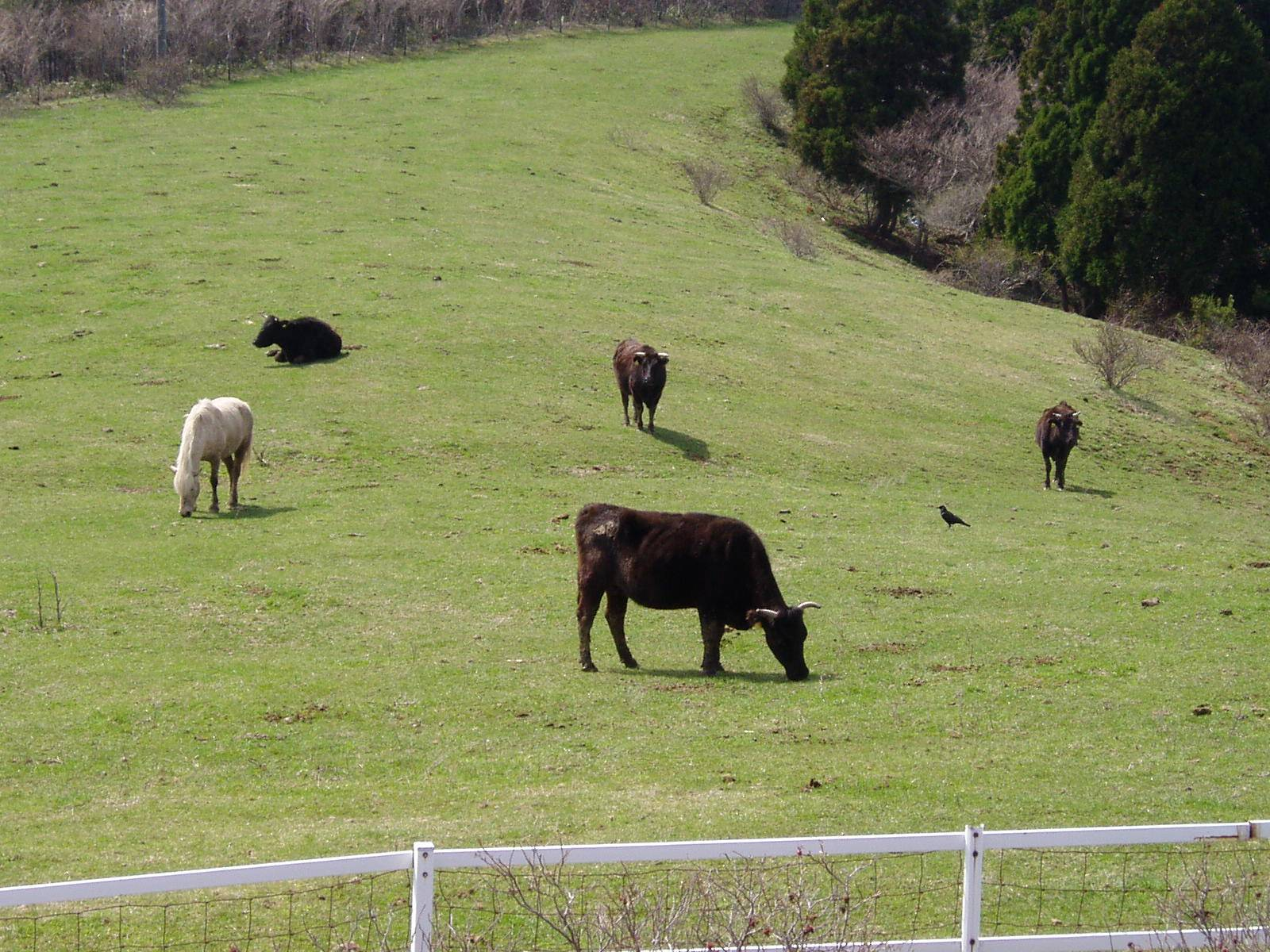
Seaside Cattle Park Oma (Town Management Ranch)

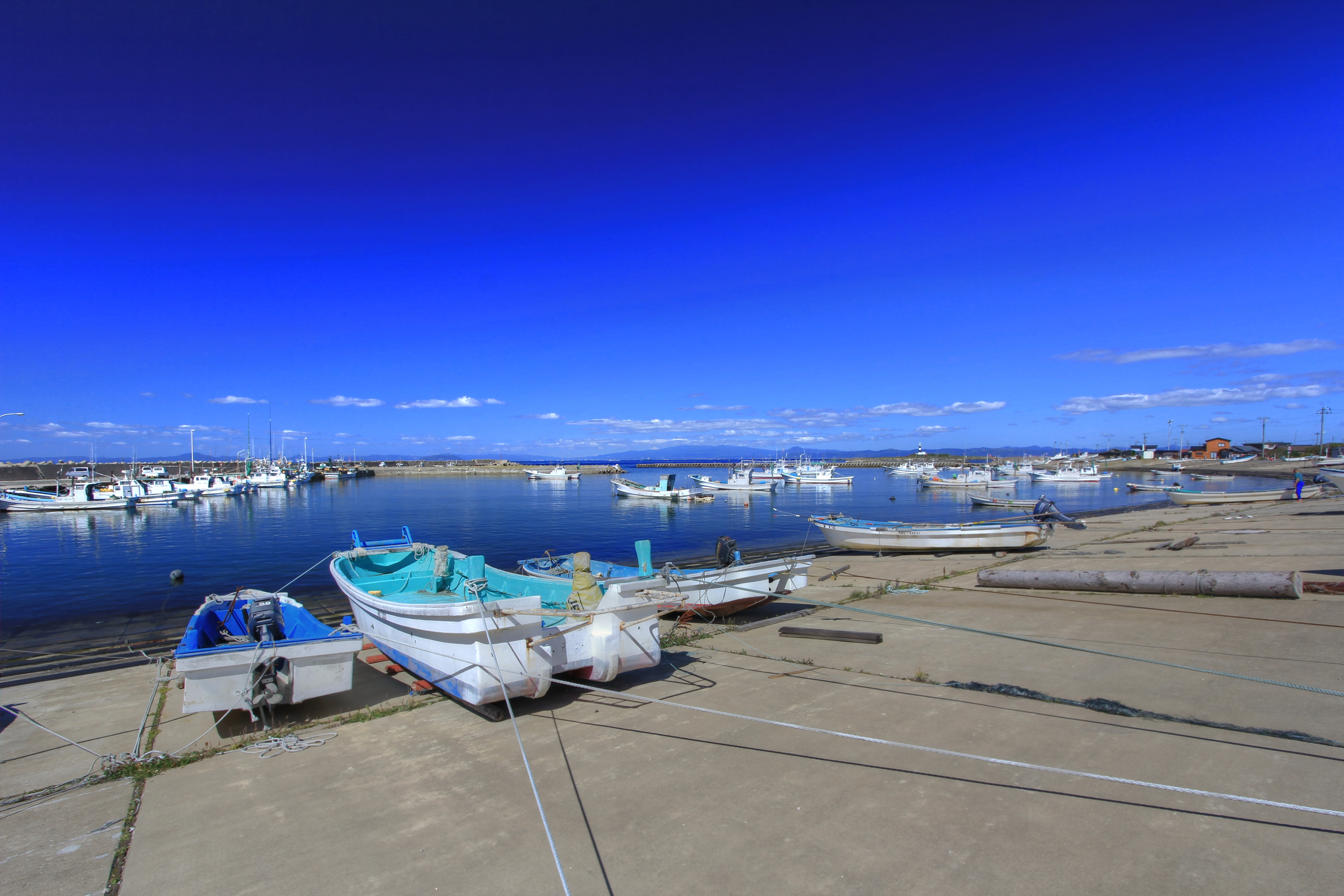
Omazaki fishing port

The economy of Ōma was traditionally heavily dependent on commercial fishing. The town was famous for having the "black diamond" of tuna, which are caught in the traditional manner by hand in two-person boats, and sold under the "Ōma" registered brand. One Ōma tuna was sold at a then record-high 333.6 million yen in January 2019. Other seafood products include sea urchin roe, konbu and squid. The new record price for a bluefin tuna, 510 million yen in 2026, was set by a 243 kg tuna caught off the coast of Ōma.

The town is the site of a nuclear power plant, the Ōma Nuclear Power Plant, which has faced numerous delays. What makes the nuclear power plant unique is its use of MOX fuel when it comes on line.

== Education ==
Ōma has two public elementary schools and one public middle school operated by the town government, and one public high school operated by the Aomori Prefectural Board of Education.

== Transportation ==
=== Railway ===
The town has no passenger railway service. The nearest station is Ōminato Station on the JR East Ōminato Line in Mutsu City.

=== Highway ===
- National Route 279
- National Route 338

=== Seaport ===
- Port of Ōma – Tsugaru Kaikyō Ferry operates scheduled services to Hakodate in Hokkaido.

== Local attractions ==
- Akaishi Beach
- Ōma Onsen, hot spring resort
- Ōmazaki, northernmost point on the island of Honshū
- Ōmazaki Lighthouse, one of the "50 Lighthouses of Japan"

== Sister cities ==
=== In Japan ===
- (Japan) Hakodate, Hokkaidō

=== Overseas ===
- Huwei, Yunlin, Taiwan

== Notable people from Ōma ==
- Hiroshi Izumi – silver medalist in judo at the 2004 Summer Olympics
