= Gōtarō Mikami =

Japanese physician

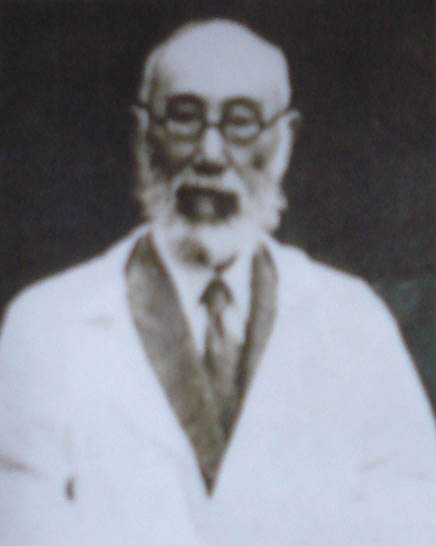
- Dr Gōtarō Mikami
- Born: November 15, 1869; Sai, Aomori
- Died: October 1964
- Occupation: Medical doctor
- Known for: Japanese Red Cross

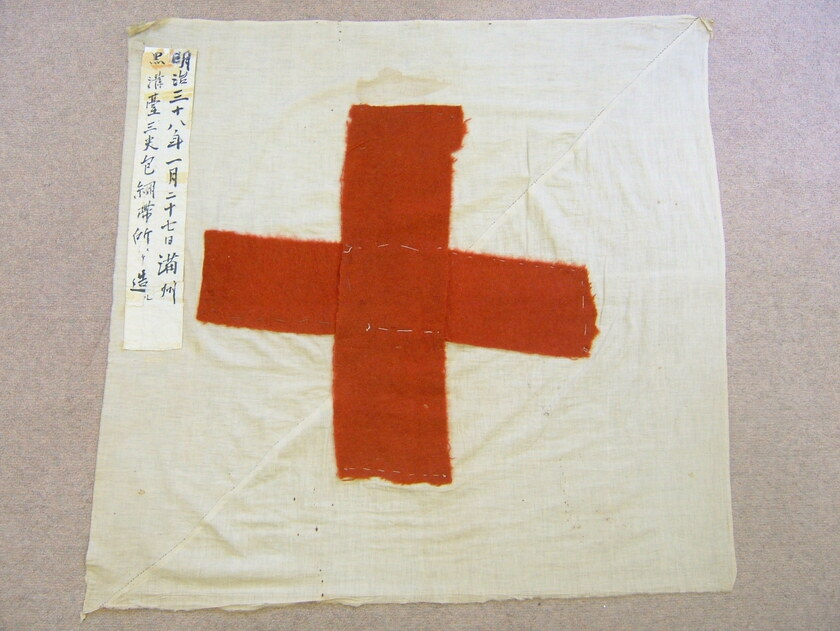
Mikami's Red Cross Flag

Gōtarō Mikami (三上 剛太郎, Mikami Gōtarō; 15 November 1869 – October 1964) was a Japanese medical doctor during the 1904–1905 Russo-Japanese War noted for his work with the Red Cross.

== Biography ==
Mikami was born in the village of Sai on the northern tip of Shimokita Peninsula in Aomori Prefecture. His family had been doctors to the Morioka Domain of the Nambu clan for eight generations in the Edo period. In 1884, accompanied by his father Shikei, he went to Tokyo, where he enrolled at the Mita English School. While studying, Mikami was strongly influenced by the literature scholar, Shiken Morita. He quit school and became a reporter for the Yomiuri Shimbun newspaper. After his father died in 1893, he resumed his medical studies, enrolling in the Tokyo Saisei Gakusha vocational school the following year. Two years later he passed the two examinations that allowed him to become a medical doctor.

In 1902, Mikami returned to his home village of Sai to devote himself to his medical practice. However, only two years later the Russo-Japanese War began, and Mikami volunteered for the Imperial Japanese Army, where he was assigned to the IJA 3rd Army’s Eighth Division as a medic. In January 1905, he was assigned to a field unit in Manchuria. When his field hospital was surrounded by the Russian army and under threat of attack, Mikami made a crude hand-made flag with the Red Cross symbol from white triangular bandages and pieces of a red blanket. On seeing the flag, the Russians did not attack. Mikami was able to care for the wounded from both sides. The incident was popularized by the Red Cross as tangible proof of the humanitarian Geneva Convention.

After the Russo-Japanese War ended, Mikami commuted between Sai and Tokyo, committing himself to further study and his medical practice. He read a wide variety of books including medicine, politics, religion, history and literature. He mastered French with only a dictionary to realize his childhood dream of reading Les Misérables in its original language. He remained active in supporting the efforts of the Japanese Red Cross until his death in 1964.

In 1963, when the International Red Cross celebrated its hundredth anniversary in Geneva, Switzerland Mikami's flag was put on display. Mikami's Edo-period house in Sai Village has been preserved as a local history museum, and is open to the public from April 29 – October 31 annually.
