= Cape Ōma =

Northernmost point of Honshu, Japan

Cape Ōma 大間崎
- Cape
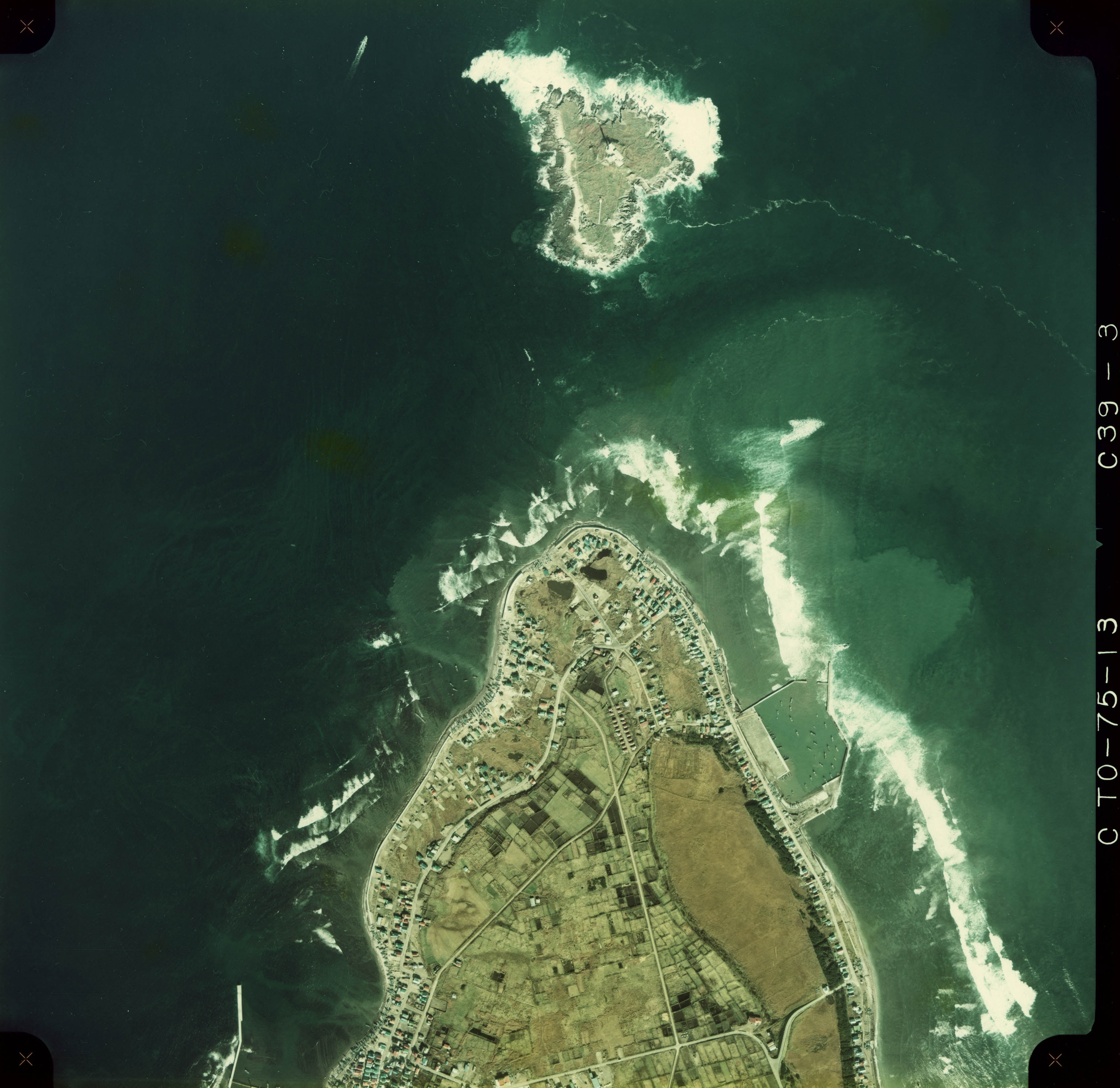
- Aerial Photo of Omasaki and Benten Island in Oma Town, Aomori Prefecture, Japan, in 1975

- Location of Ōmazaki in Aomori Prefecture Cape Ōma (Japan)
- Coordinates: 41°32′47″N 140°54′45″E
- Location: Ōma, Aomori, Japan

Cape Ōma (大間崎, Ōmazaki) is the northernmost point of the island of Honshu in Japan. It is located within the borders of the town of Ōma, Aomori in northern Shimokita Peninsula, and is part of the Shimokita Hantō Quasi-National Park. The cape extends into the Tsugaru Strait separating Honshu from Hokkaido, which is 18 kilometres (11 mi) away. On a clear day, Mount Hakodate on the island of Hokkaido to the north can be seen.

Ōmazaki Lighthouse is located on a small island just offshore from Cape Ōma.

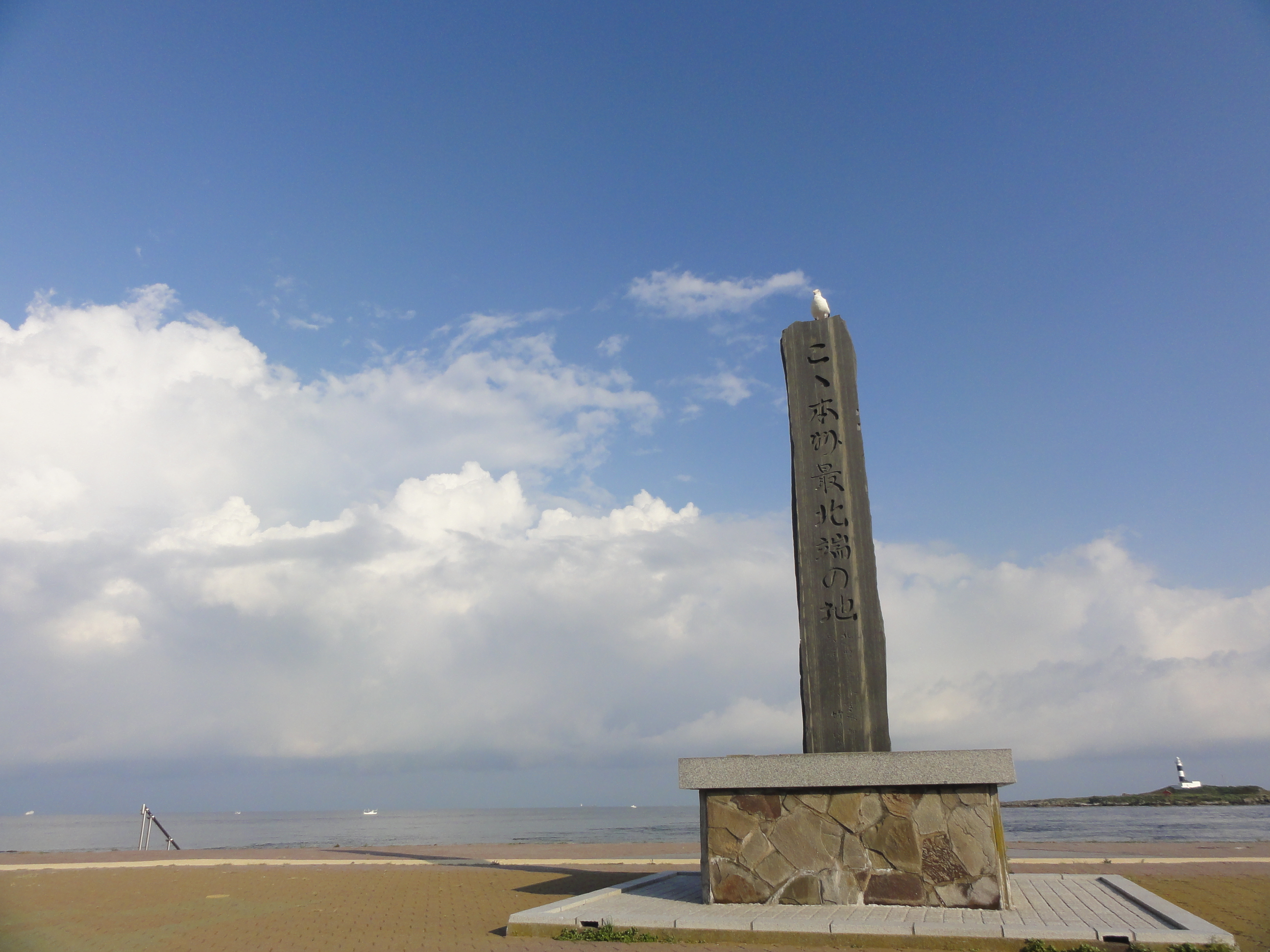
Monument indicating the northernmost point on Honshu
