= Sai, Aomori =

Sai 佐井村
- Village
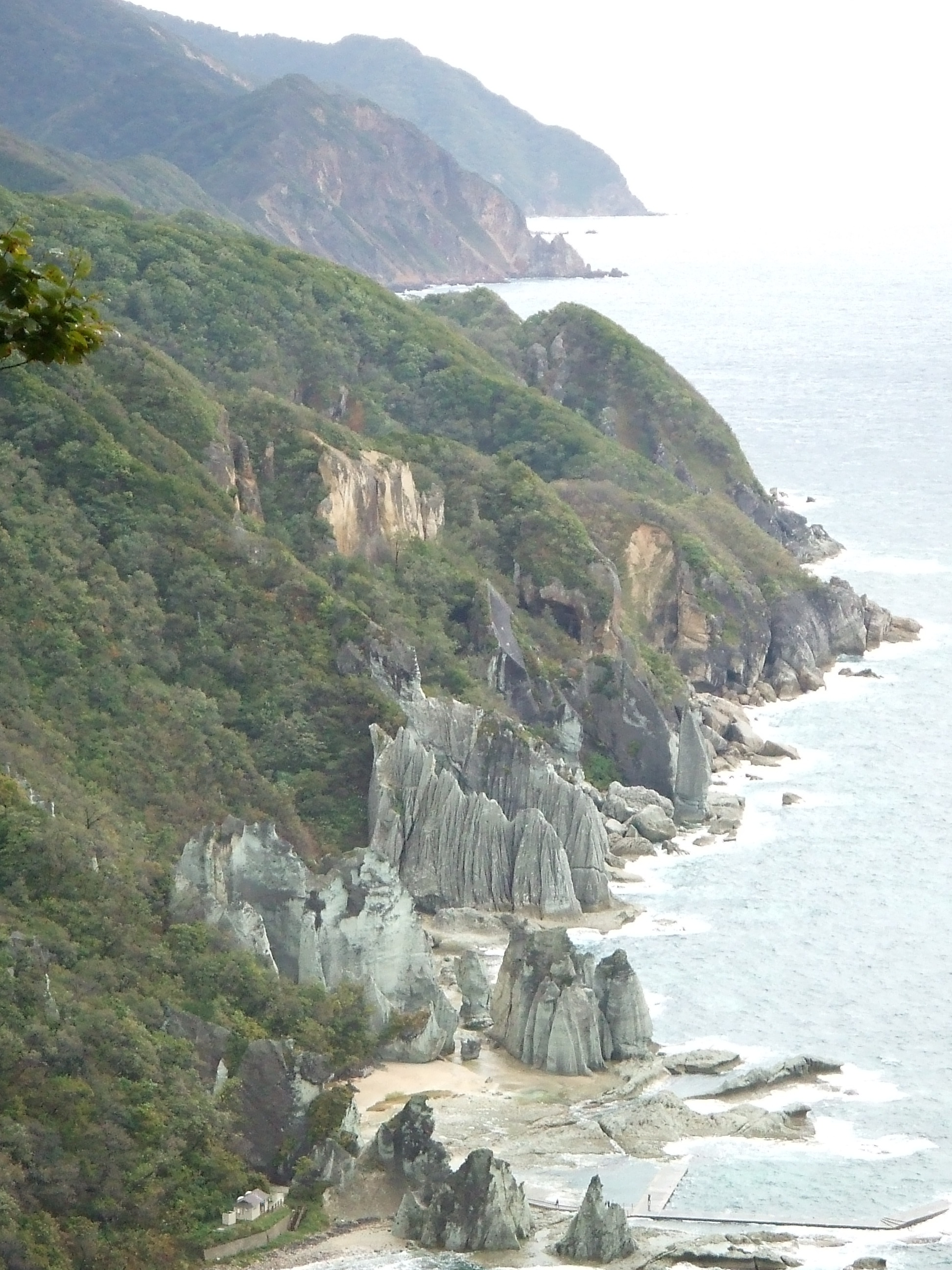
- Hotokegaura coastline

- Flag Seal
- Location of Sai in Aomori Prefecture

- Coordinates (Sai Village Hall): 41°25′47″N 140°51′33″E
- Country: Japan
- Region: Tōhoku
- Prefecture: Aomori
- District: Shimokita

Area
  - Total: 135.05 km^{2} (52.14 sq mi)

Population (November 30, 2025)
  - Total: 1,572
  - Density: 11.64/km^{2} (30.15/sq mi)
- Time zone: UTC+9 (Japan Standard Time)
- Phone number: 0175-38-2111
- Address: 20 Nukamori, Sai-mura, Shimokita-gun, Aomori-ken 039-4711
- Website: Official website
- Symbols
- Bird: Osprey
- Flower: Lily
- Tree: Hiba

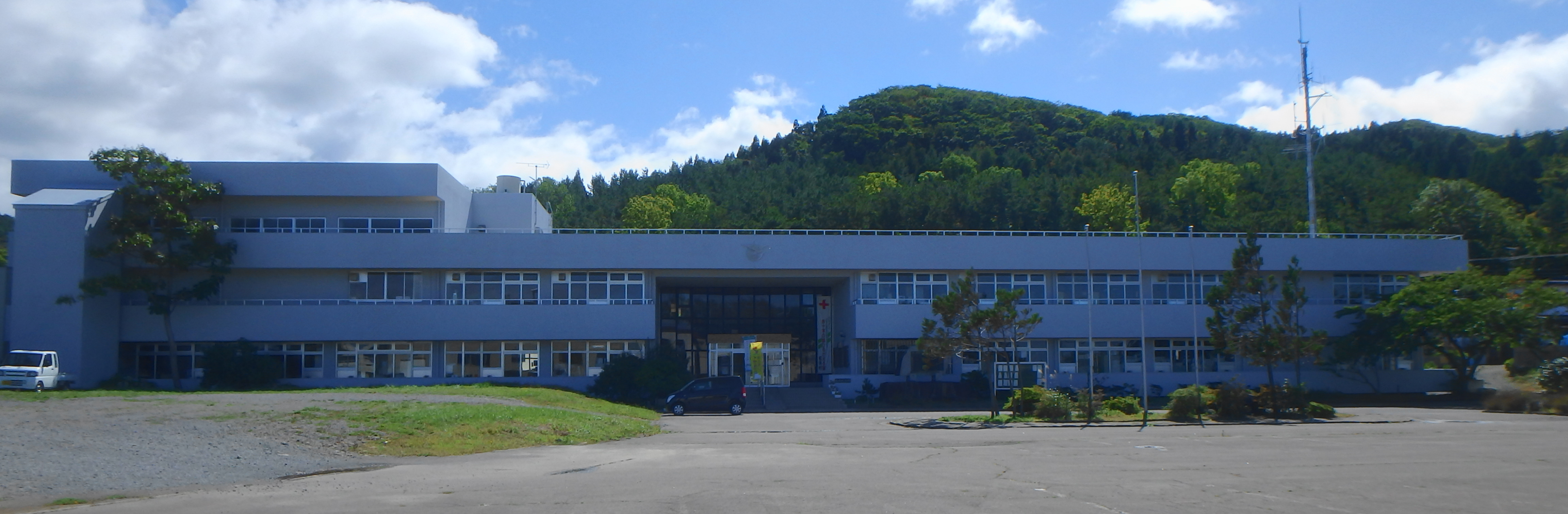
Sai Village Hall

Sai (佐井村, Sai-mura) is a village located in Aomori, Japan. As of 30 November 2025, the village had an estimated population of 1,572 in 842 households, and a population density of 12 persons per square kilometre. Its total area is 135.05 square kilometres (52.14 sq mi). In 2016, Sai was selected as one of The Most Beautiful Villages in Japan.

== Geography ==
Sai occupies the western coastline of Shimokita Peninsula, forming a long, narrow shape from north-to-south, facing the inlet to Mutsu Bay from the Tsugaru Strait. It is surrounded by mountains to the north, east and south, ranging from 600 to 800 meters in height that make up the Osorezan mountain range. The urban area consists of eight hamlets scattered along the coastline and one in the mountains. Much of the village is within the limits of the Shimokita Hantō Quasi-National Park. The mountainous area is home to many indigenous plant and animal species. Wildlife includes Japanese macaque monkeys, kamoshika, tanuki and Asian black bears. Most of the population resides in coastal hamlets. Approximately 90% of the village area is forested; of which 90% is national forest.

=== Neighbouring municipalities ===
Aomori Prefecture

- Ōma
- Mutsu

=== Climate ===
The village has a cold oceanic climate characterized by cool short summers and long cold winters with heavy snowfall and strong winds (Köppen climate classification Cfb). The average annual temperature in Sai is 8.9 °C. The average annual rainfall is 1258 mm with September as the wettest month. The temperatures are highest on average in August, at around 21.8 °C, and lowest in January, at around -2.7 °C.

== Demographics ==
Per Japanese census data, the population of Sai has declined over the past 60 years and is now much less than it was a century ago.

Historical population

Year	Pop.	±%
1920	3,202	—
1930	3,816	+19.2%
1940	4,364	+14.4%
1950	5,370	+23.1%
1960	5,271	−1.8%
1970	4,622	−12.3%

Year	Pop.	±%
1980	4,174	−9.7%
1990	3,348	−19.8%
2000	3,010	−10.1%
2010	2,422	−19.5%
2020	1,788	−26.2%

== History ==
The area around Sai was inhabited by the Emishi people until the historical period. During the Edo period, it was controlled by the Nambu clan of Morioka Domain and prospered due to its timber industry and as a ferry terminal to Ezo. During the post-Meiji restoration establishment of the modern municipalities system on 1 April 1889, Sai Village was proclaimed from the merger of Sai hamlet with neighboring Chōgō hamlet.

== Government ==
Sai has a mayor-council form of government with a directly elected mayor and a unicameral village council of eight members. Sai is part of Shimokita District which, together with the city of Mutsu, contributes three members to the Aomori Prefectural Assembly. In terms of national politics, the city is part of Aomori 1st district of the lower house of the Diet of Japan.

== Economy ==
The economy of Sai is heavily dependent on forestry and commercial fishing. Approximately 90% of the village area is covered by mountains and forest, of which approximately 90% is national forest. Some of the locally caught seafood include sea urchin roe, sea pineapple, sea cucumber, scallops, abalone, konbu and squid. Seasonal tourism is also an important contributor to the local economy.

== Education ==
Sai has one public elementary school, one public middle school and one combined public elementary/middle schools operated by the village government. The village does not have a high school.

== Transportation ==
=== Railway ===
The village has no passenger railway service. The nearest train station is Shimokita Station on the JR East Ōminato Line.

=== Highway ===
- National Route 338

== Local attractions ==
- Hotokegaura, a series of naturally-carved cliff rock formations, a National Site of Scenic Beauty
- Shimokita Hanto Quasi-National Park
- Tsugaru Straits Cultural Museum Arusas
- Yanonemori Hachiman-gu
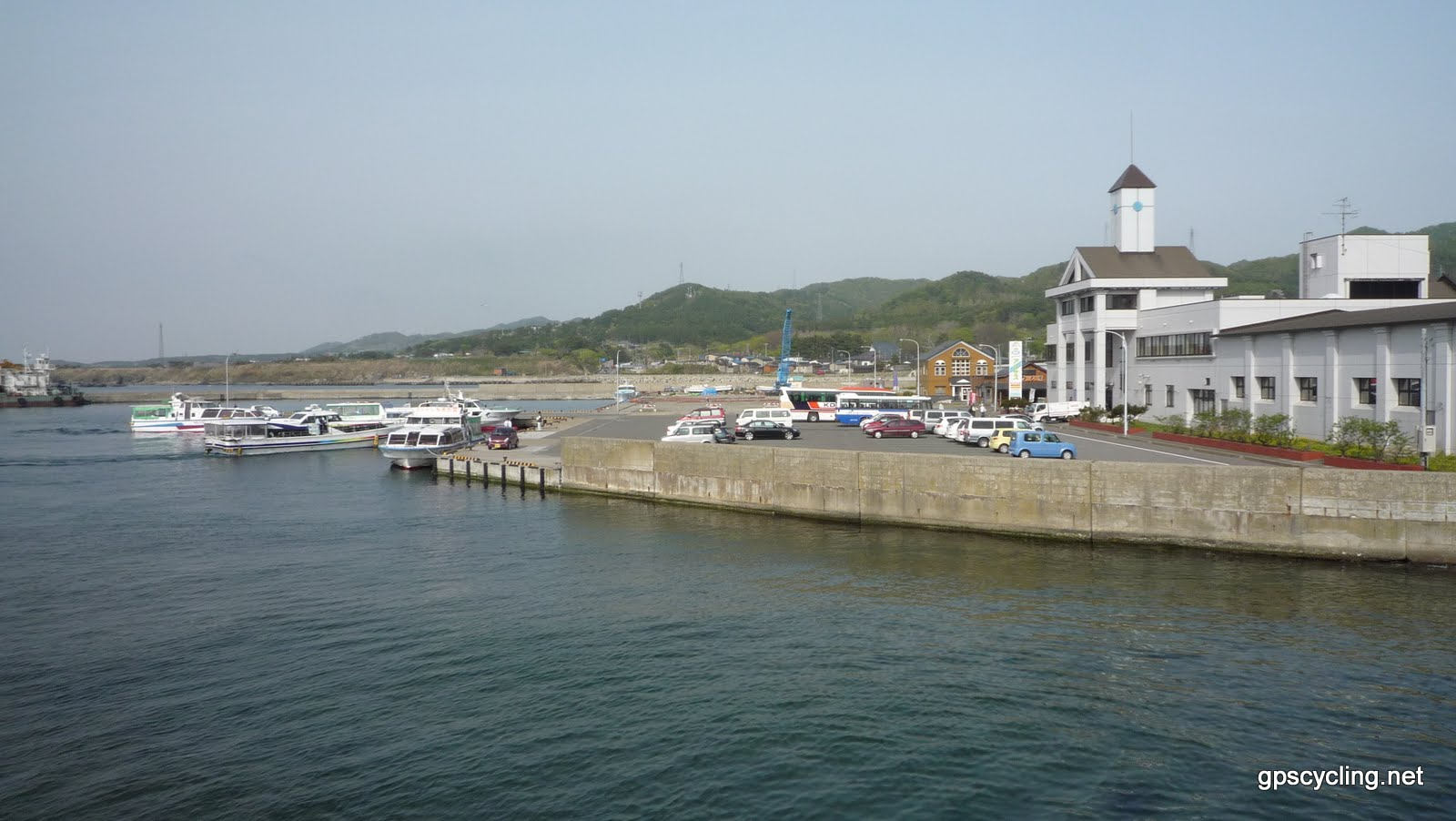
Sai port

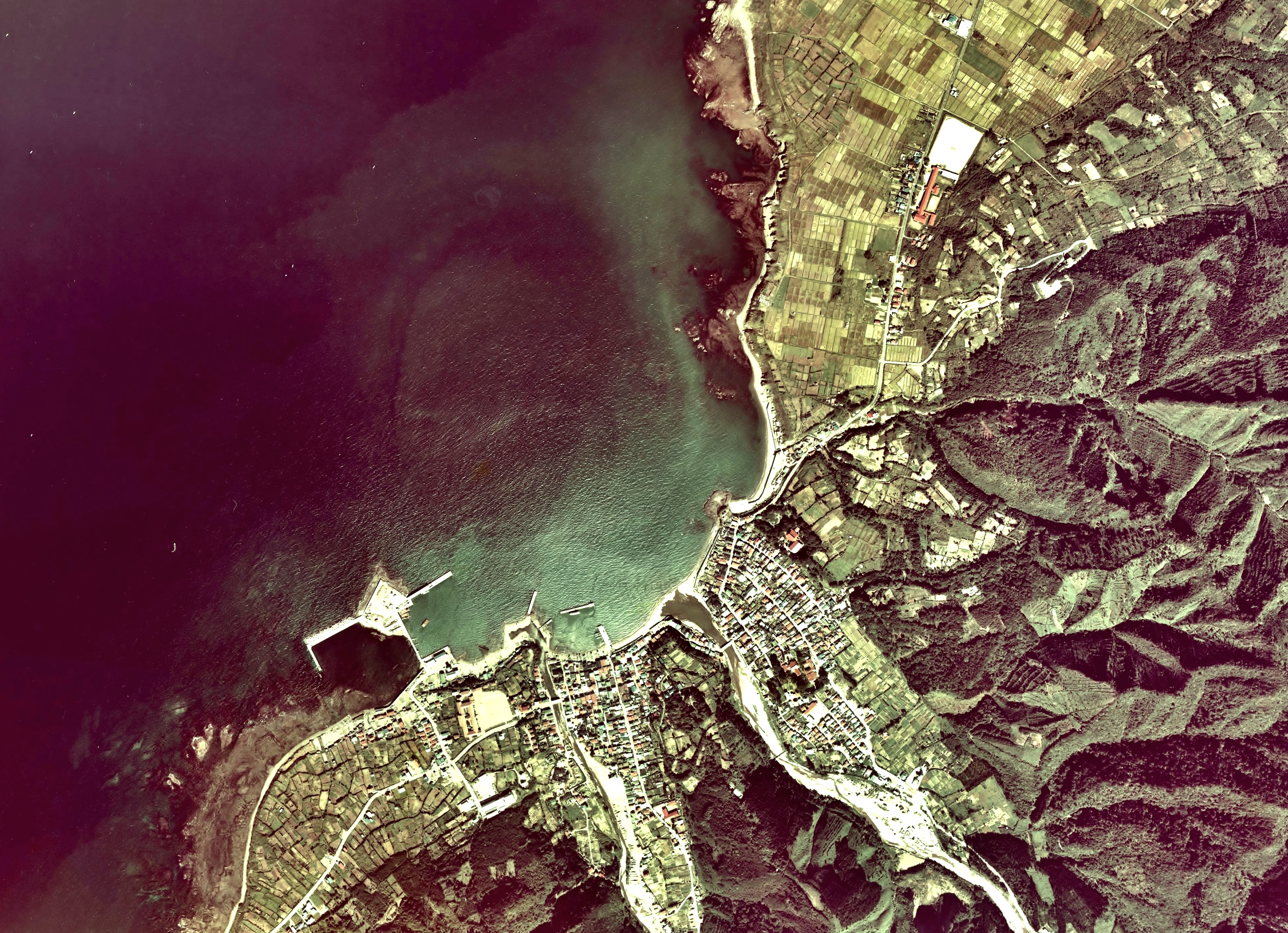
Sai village center area Aerial photograph.1975

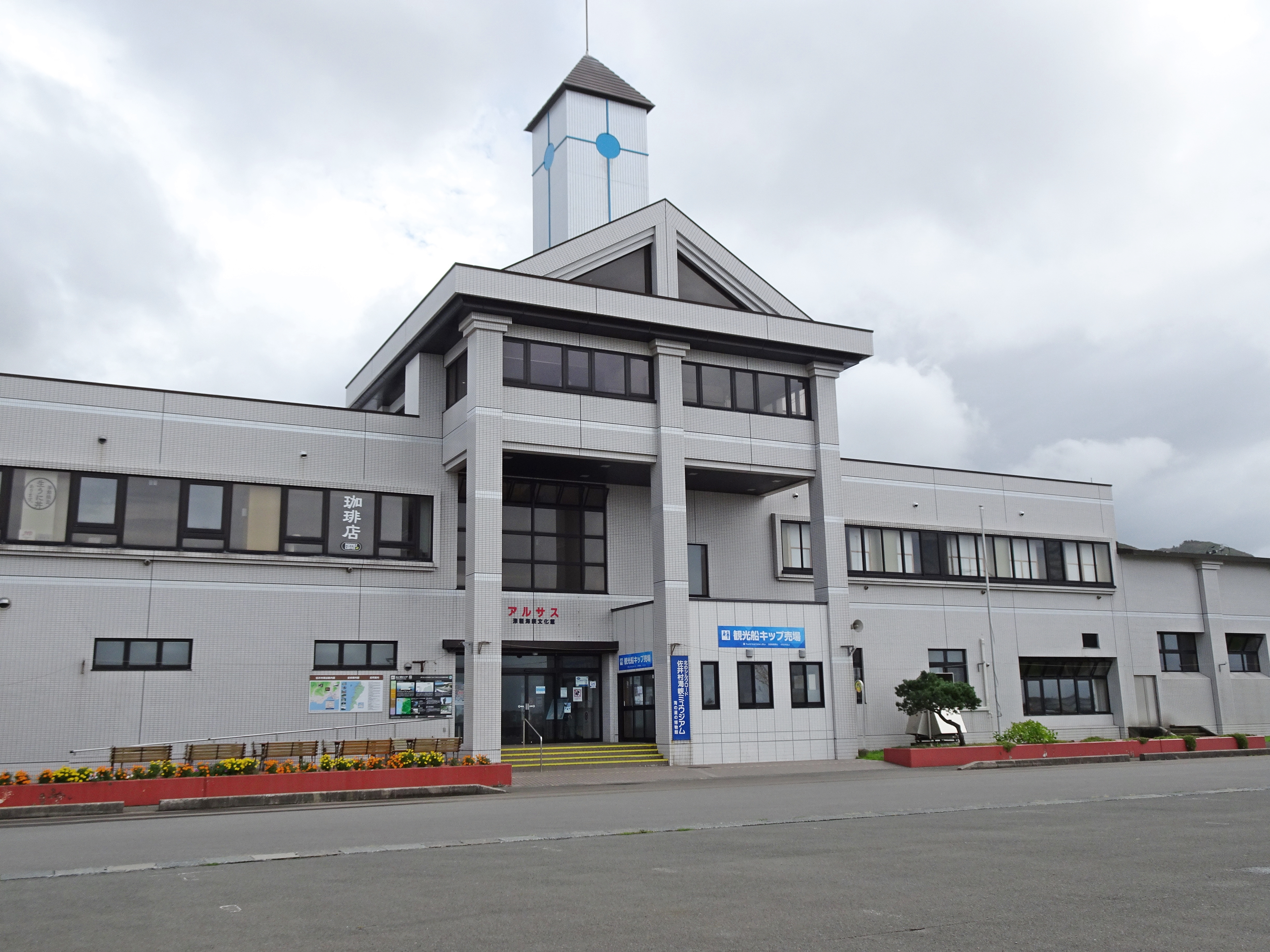
Tsugaru Straits Cultural Museum Arusas

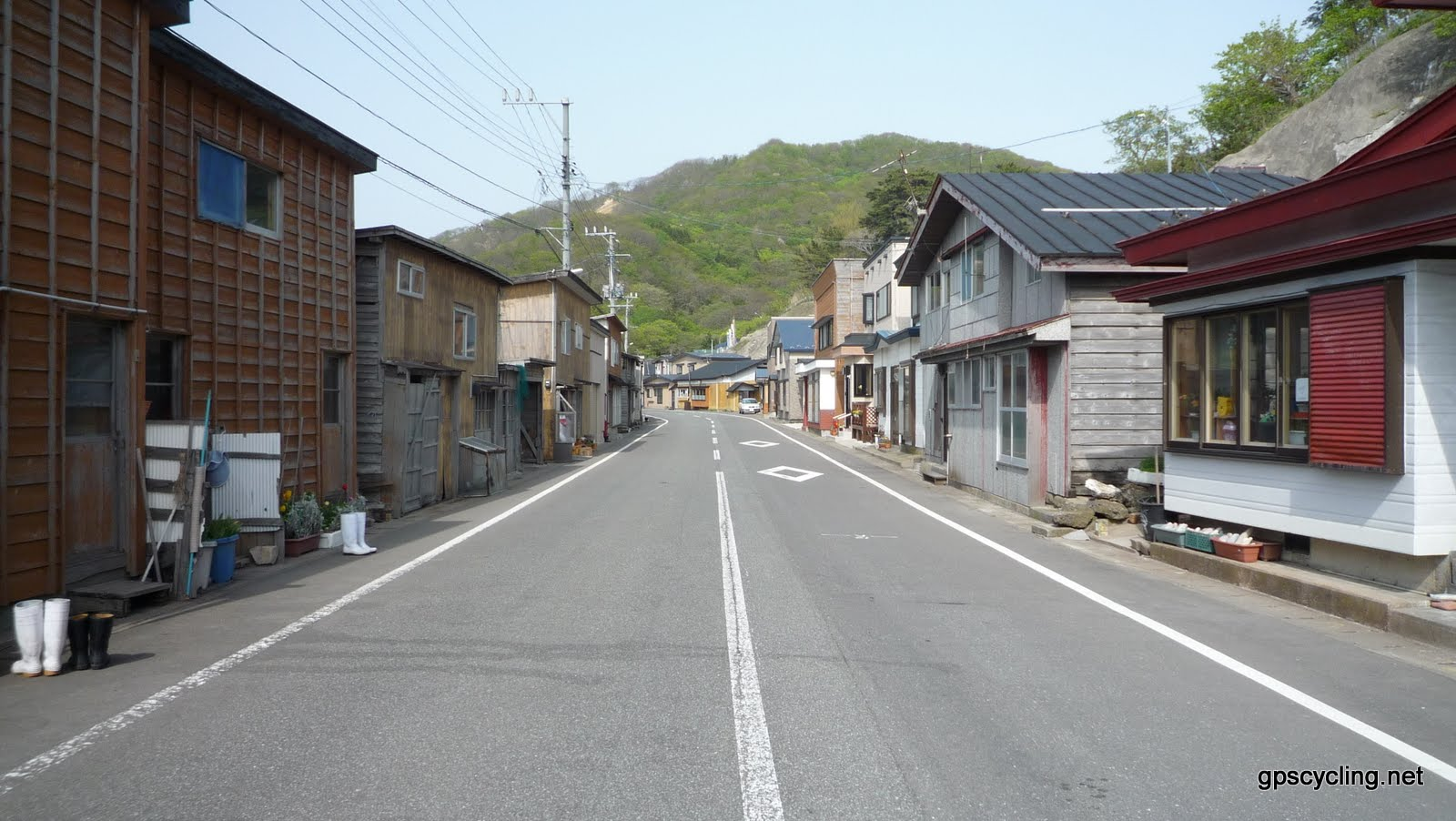
Isoya neighbourhood of Sai

=== Local events ===
- February, Fukuura hamlet stages a kabuki show featuring northern styles of kabuki.
- June: sea urchin roe festival
- July: Hotokegaura festival
- August: Sai Summer Festival and fireworks
- September, Yanonemori Hachiman-gu Matsuri with floats pulled by the locals, during which Kagura is performed and Shinto priests bless the village houses
- November, Sai Culture Festival, during which different variations of festival songs and kagura are performed at the community centre.
- December: Winter illumination

== Noted people from Sai ==
- Gōtarō Mikami, physician and Japanese Red Cross supporter during the Russo-Japanese War
