= Hotoke-ga-ura =

Series of rock formations in Sai, Aomori, Japan

Hotokegaura
- IUCN category III (natural monument or feature)
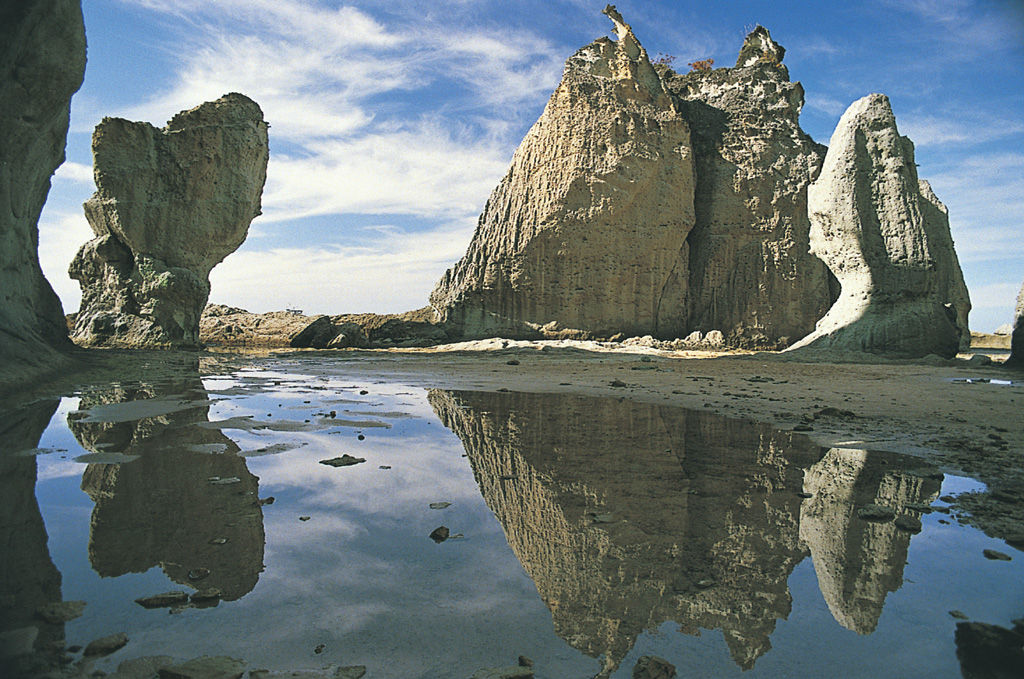
- typical rock formations at Hotokegaura

- Location within Aomori Prefecture Location within Japan
- Location: Sai, Shimokita, Aomori Prefecture, Japan
- Coordinates: 41°18′43.9″N 140°48′18.4″E
- Length: 1.5 km (0.93 mi)
- Established: April 23, 1941
- National Place of Scenic Beauty Natural Monument

Hotokegaura (仏ヶ浦 also 仏宇多, Hotoke-ga-ura) is a series of rock formations along the sea cliffs on the west coast of Shimokita Peninsula at the entrance to Mutsu Bay in far northern Japan. These rock formations were designed a Natural Monument of Aomori Prefecture in 1934, and became further protected from April 23, 1941 as a nationally designated Place of Scenic Beauty and Natural Monument, From 1968, the rock formations were also located within the borders of the Shimokita Hantō Quasi-National Park. In 1975, the surrounding waters were designated as Hotokegaura Marine Park.

== Overview ==
These natural wave-eroded formations are made from green volcanic tuff, with a height of approximately 90 metres (300 ft) and extend for a 1.5 kilometres (0.93 mi) stretch of coastline in the village of Sai, Aomori Prefecture. Individual features have been named for figures in Buddhist theology, and were popularised by the poet and mountaineer Omachi Keigetsu (1869-1925) after his visit in September 1922, although the area had been well-known since the Edo period at part of the pilgrimage route to Mount Osore.

The area is difficult to reach overland despite its proximity to Japan National Route 338, and tourist boats depart from the village of Sai or the city of Mutsu from April through October. In 1991, a small jetty was constructed for the purpose of berthing a sightseeing boat

== See also ==
- Shimokita Hantō Quasi-National Park
- Jōdogahama
- List of Places of Scenic Beauty of Japan (Aomori)

== Gallery ==
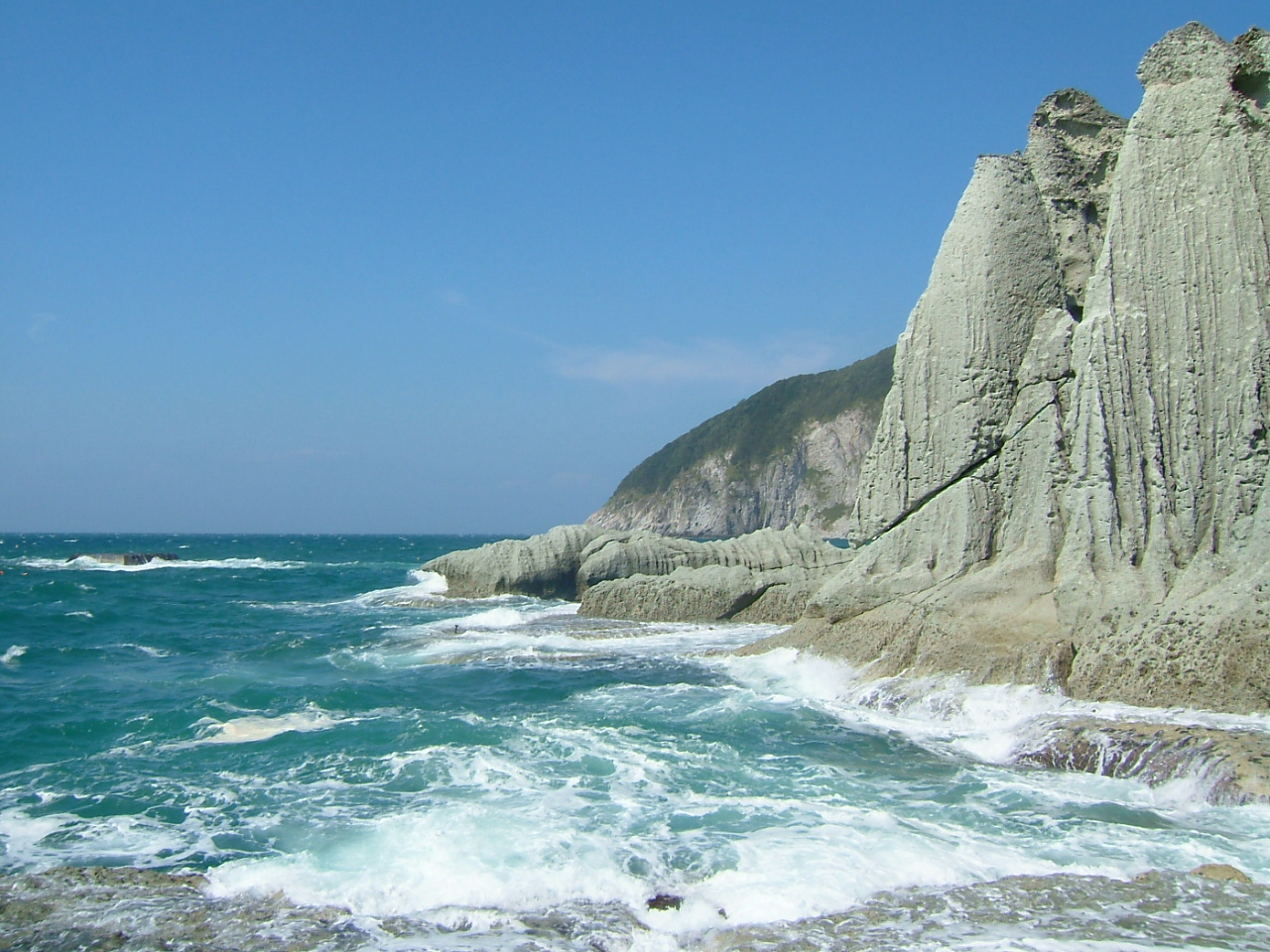
Panorama

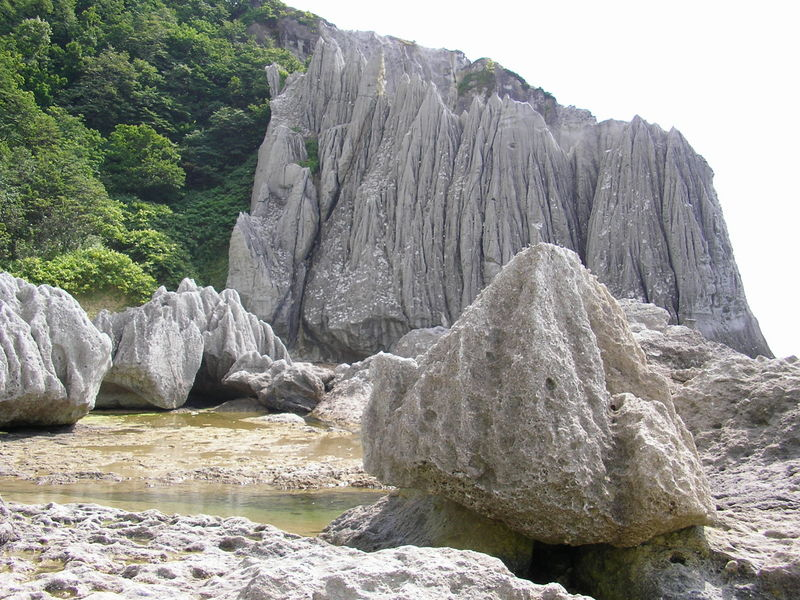
Rock formations

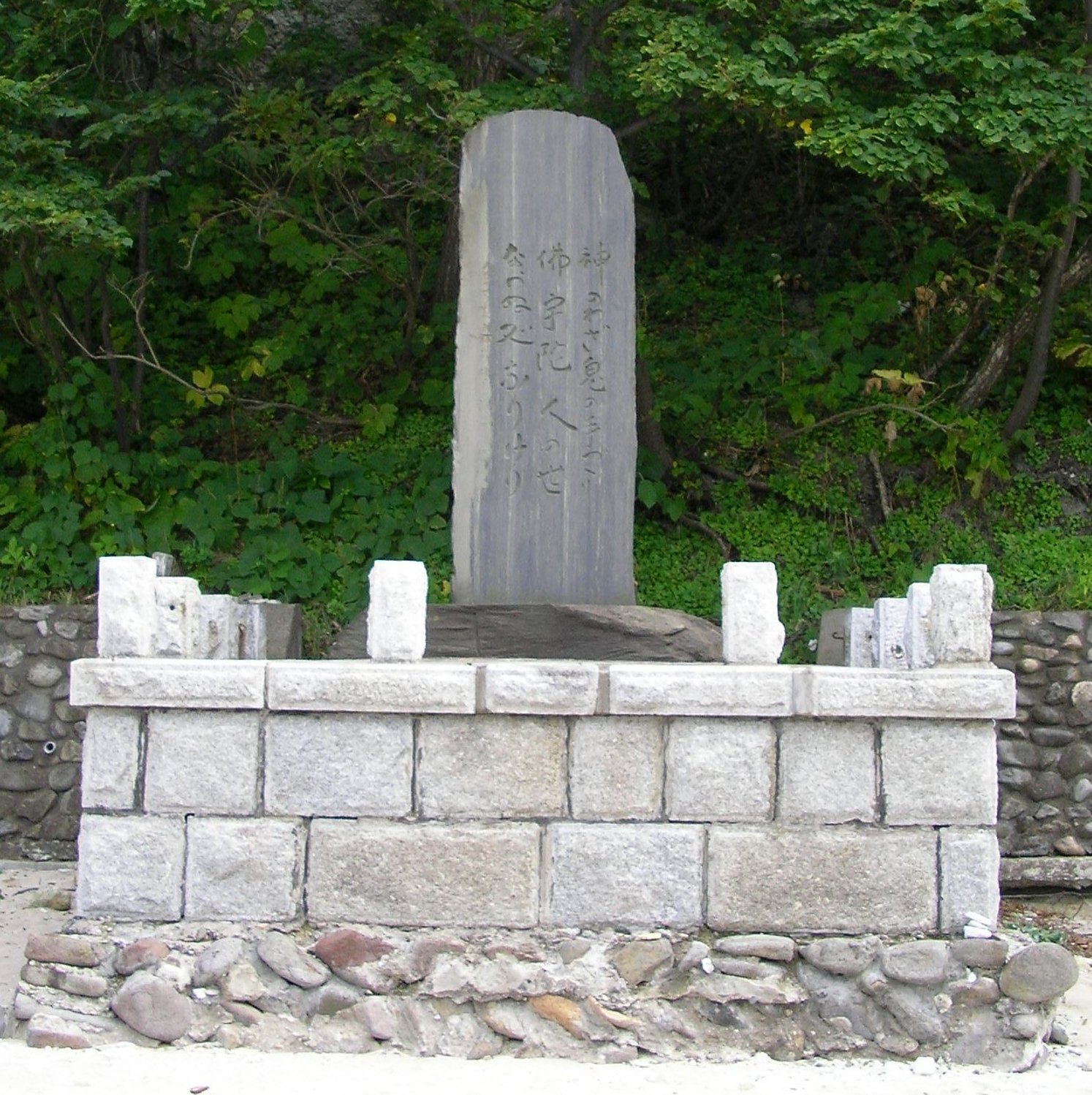
Monument to Omachi Keigetsu
