= Shimokita Hantō Quasi-National Park =

Quasi-national park of Aomori prefecture, Japan

- 下北半島国定公園
- IUCN category V (protected landscape/seascape)
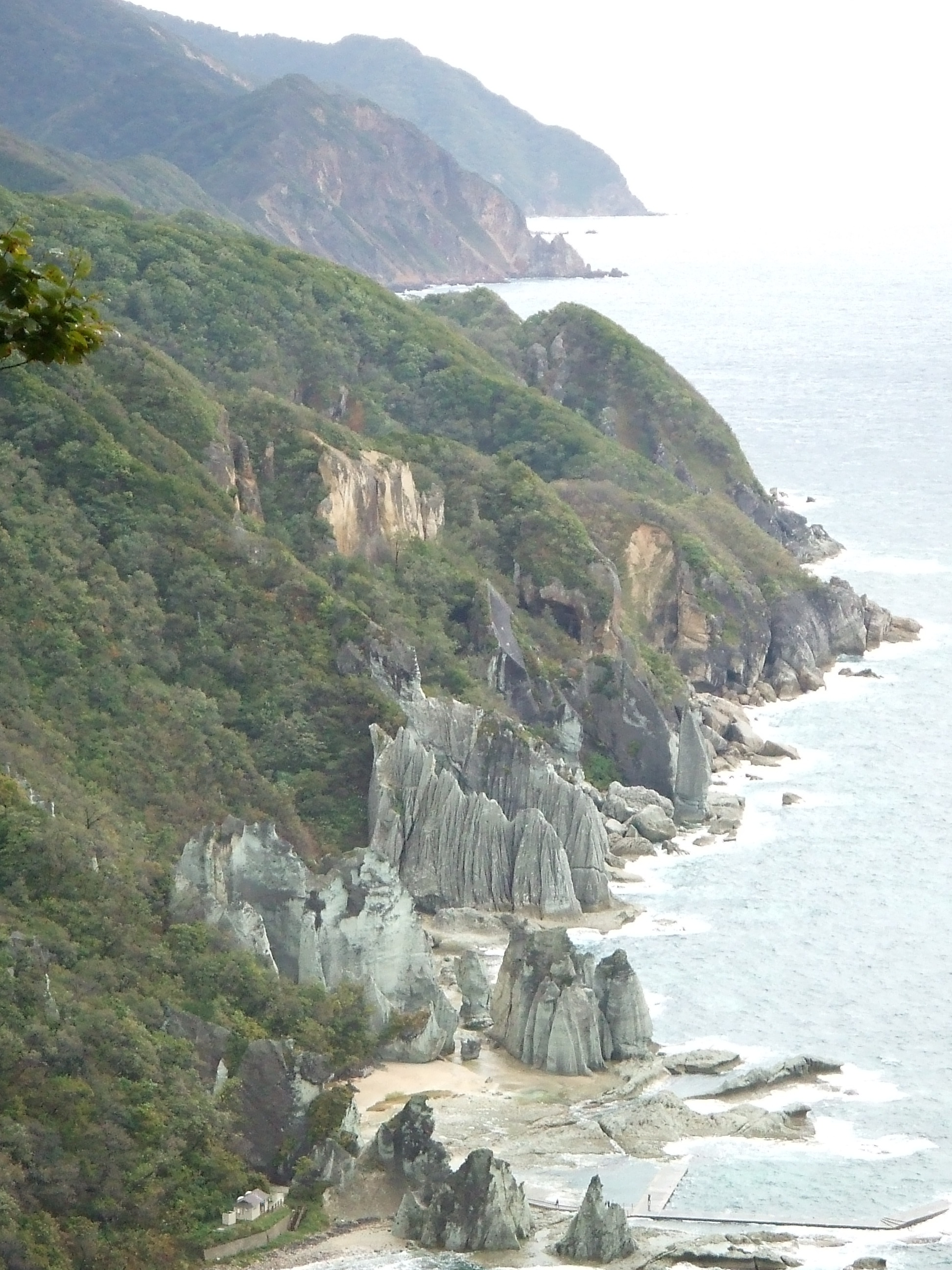
- Hotoke-ga-ura

- Location within Aomori Prefecture Location within Japan
- Location: Honshū, Japan
- Nearest city: Mutsu
- Coordinates: 41°31′33″N 140°55′25″E
- Area: 18,728 hectares (72.31 sq mi)
- Established: July 22, 1968
- Governing body: Aomori, prefectural governments

Shimokita Hantō Quasi-National Park (下北半島国定公園, Shimokita-hantō Kokutei Kōen) is a quasi-national park in the Shimokita Peninsula of Aomori Prefecture in the Tōhoku region of far northern Honshū in Japan. It is rated a protected landscape (category V) according to the IUCN. The park, consists of several discontinuous locations, which include:

- the volcanic peaks and caldera lakes of the Osorezan Mountain Range and surrounding forests.
- Yagen Valley, with its hot springs
- the coastal rock formations of Hotokegaura on the west coast of Shimokita Peninsula
- Cape Ōma, the northernmost point of Honshū
- Cape Shiriya, the northeasternmost point Honshū and the Sarugamori Sand Dunes
- Taijima, an island off the coast of Wakinosawa

The park also encompasses a portion of the natural habitat of the Japanese macaque. The mountainous interior is forested with Siebold's beech and Nootka cypress, and coastal areas have stands of tilia and oak. The area was designated a quasi-national park on July 22, 1968.

The borders of the park span the municipalities of Mutsu, Higashidōri, Sai, and Ōma.

Like all Quasi-National Parks in Japan, Shimokita Hantō Quasi-National Park is managed by the local prefectural government.

== Gallery ==
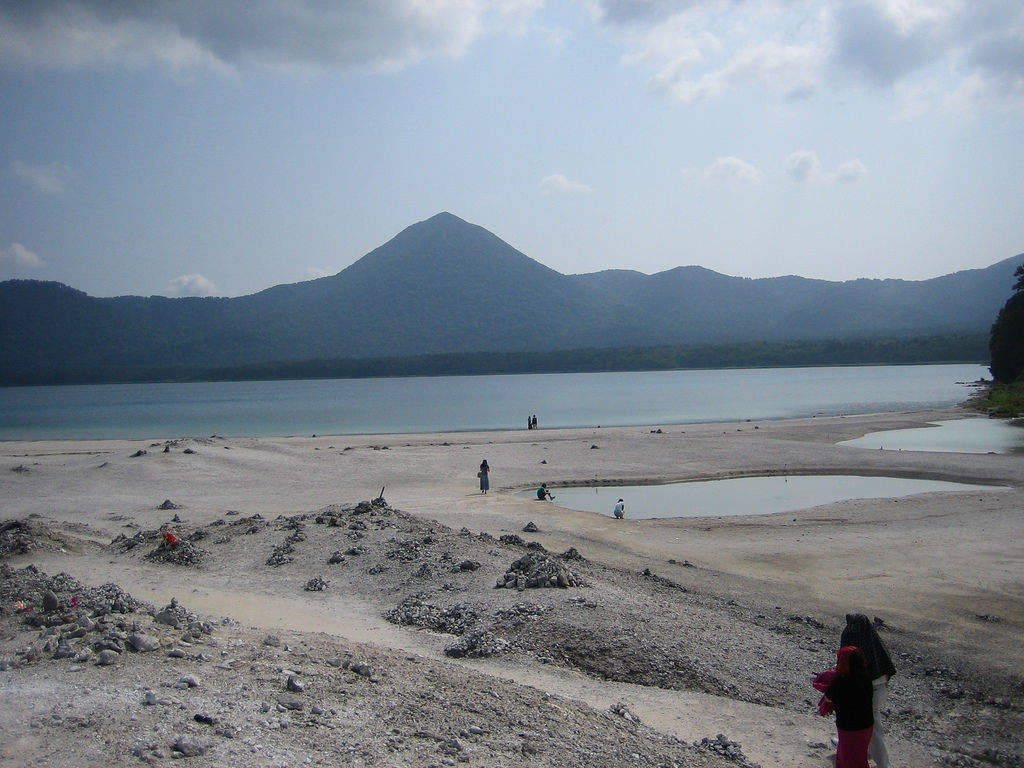

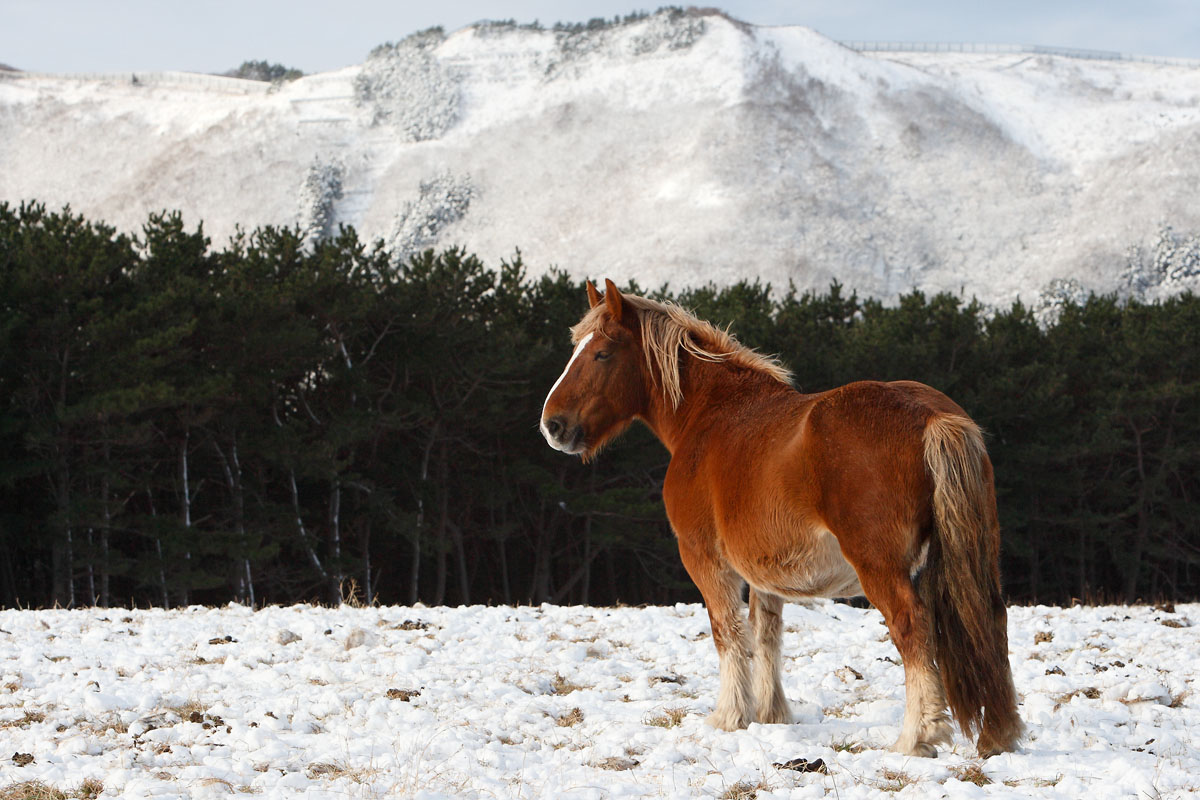

== See also ==
- List of national parks of Japan
