= Ōma Nuclear Power Plant =

Building in Aomori Prefecture, Japan

Ōma Nuclear Power Station
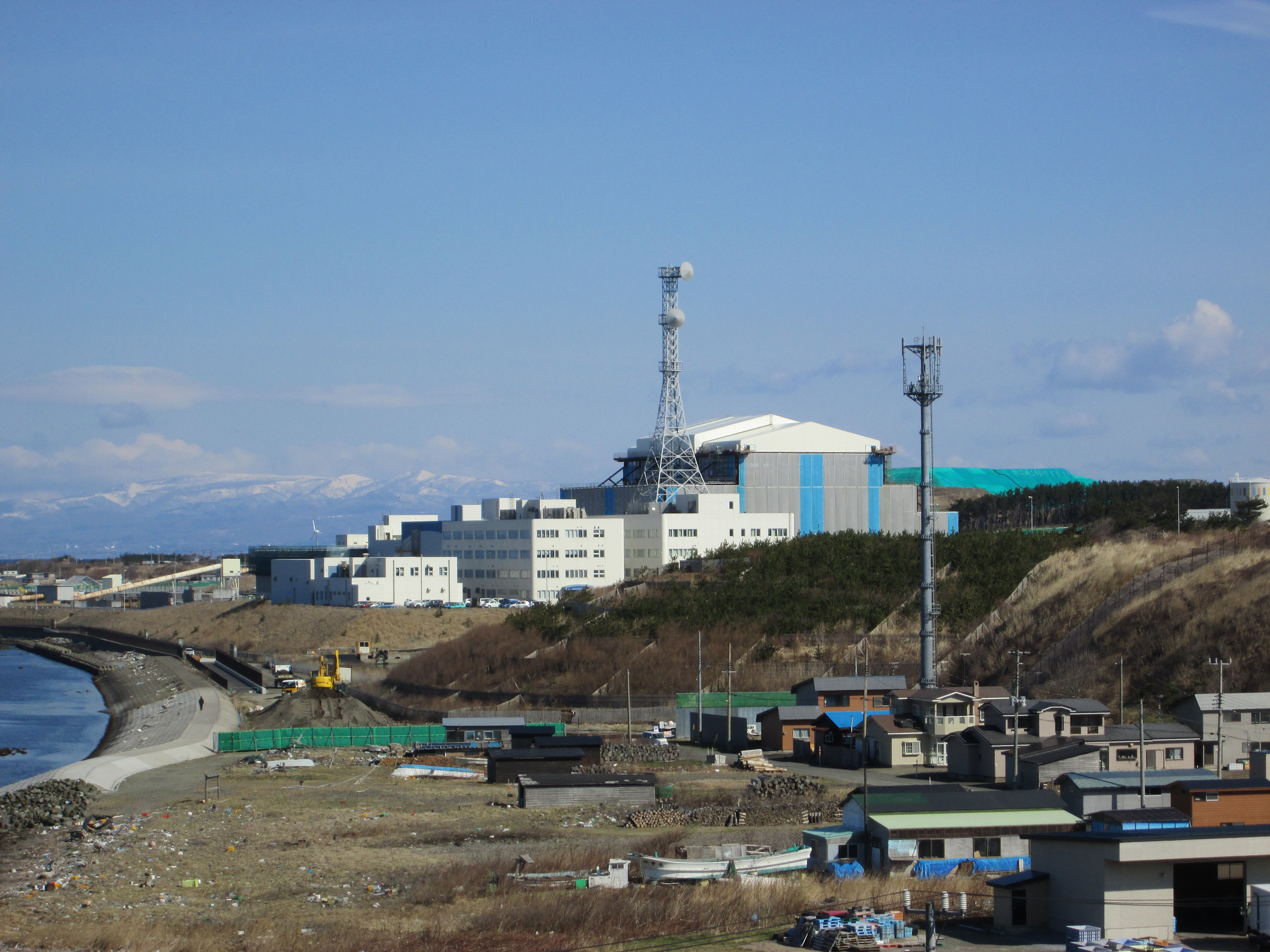
- Ōma Nuclear Power Plant (2019)
- Official name: 大間原子力発電所
- Country: Japan
- Location: Ōma, Aomori
- Coordinates: 41°30′35″N 140°54′37″E
- Status: Under construction
- Construction began: May 7, 2010
- Commission date: 2030 (planned)
- Operator: Electric Power Development Company (J-Power)

Nuclear power station
- Reactor type: ABWR
- Cooling source: Tsugaru Strait

Power generation
- Units under const.: 1 x 1,383 MW
- Nameplate capacity: 1,383 MW

External links
- Website: www.jpower.co.jp/bs/nuclear/
- Commons: Related media on Commons

The Ōma Nuclear Power Station (大間原子力発電所, Ōma genshiryoku hatsudensho) is a nuclear power facility under construction in Ōma, Aomori, Japan. It will be operated by the Electric Power Development Company (J-Power). The reactor would be unique for Japan in that it would be capable of using a 100% MOX fuel core, as requested by the 1995 decision by the Japanese Atomic Energy Commission. The fuel would utilize surplus plutonium by blending it with natural uranium, reducing the total radioactivity of nuclear waste and dramatically reducing the waste's lifetime.

In 2008, J-Power announced a 2.5-year delay to allow for additional work to make the plant resistant to a strong earthquake, making the operation start date in November 2014. Following the Fukushima Daiichi nuclear disaster of March 2011 construction at Oma was suspended for 18 months. Work was resumed in October 2012. In March 2013, the main reactor building was at its full height.

In December 2014 J-Power applied for safety checks at the Oma nuclear plant, slated for startup in 2021.

In September 2016, the commissioning date was postponed again, this time to late 2023 or early 2024. In September 2018, the startup was postponed until 2026 to allow for expanded screening.

As of September 2024, the reactor's start has been postponed to 2030 due to delays in the commencement of safety tests.
