= Sarugamori Sand Dunes =

Sand dunes in Aomori Prefecture, Japan

Sarugamori Sand Dunes 猿ヶ森砂丘
- Sand dunes
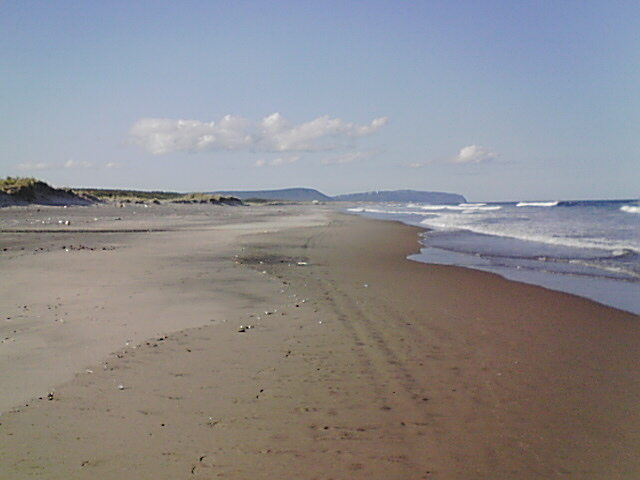
- Sarugamori Sand Dunes
- Location: Higashidōri, Aomori, Japan

Area
  - Total: 15,000 hectares (37,000 acres)

Sarugamori Sand Dunes (猿ヶ森砂丘, Sarugamori Sakyū) is a large area of sand dunes located to the east of the village of Higashidōri in northeastern Aomori Prefecture, facing the Pacific Ocean.

They are also known as the Shimokita Sand Dunes (下北砂丘, Shimokita Sakyū) because of their location on Shimokita Peninsula.

== Geography ==
Measuring approximately 17 kilometres (11 mi) long by 1 kilometre (0.62 mi) to 2 kilometres (1.2 mi) wide, with an area of 15,000 hectares (37,000 acres), the dunes are also Japan's largest area of singing sand.

Behind the sand dunes lie ponds and marshes forming an important wildlife habitat.

== Military use ==
Almost all of the area of the Sarugamori Sand Dunes are used for military training by Japan's Ministry of Defense, and generally off-limits to tourists.
