= Yagen Valley =

Hot spring in Aomori Prefecture, Japan

Coordinates: 41°23′09″N 141°03′10″E

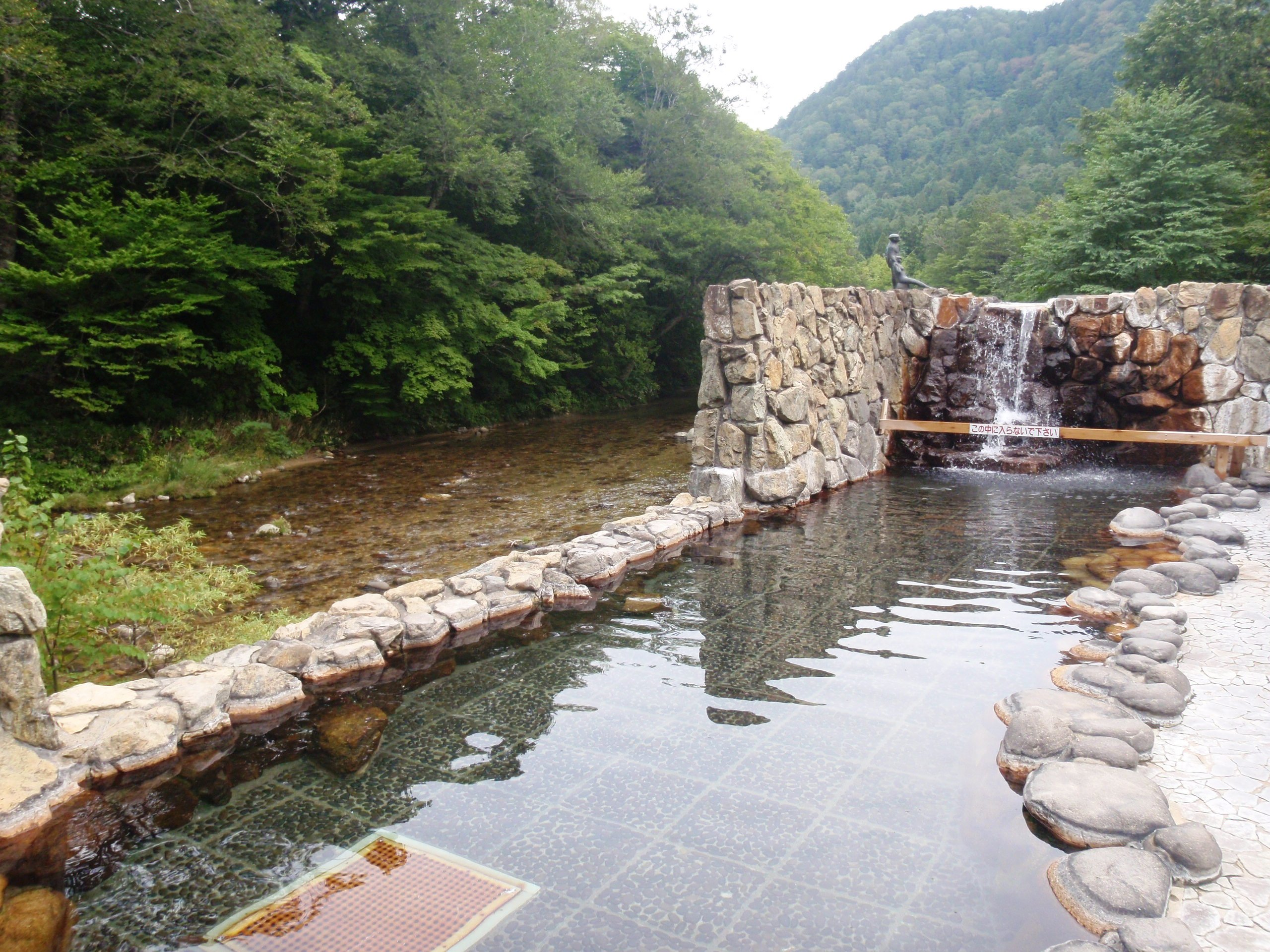
Oku-Yagen onsen

Yagen Onsen (薬研温泉) is a hot spring located in the former town of Ohata, which is now part of the city of Mutsu in northern Japan.

== Description ==
The onsen consists of multiple ryokan surrounded by old growth forests located along the Ohata River within Shimokita Hanto Quasi-National Park. The area includes a nationally-run campground called 'Kokusetsu Yagen Yaeijo'.

Oku-yagen Hot Spring is located 2 km upriver and an outdoor bath (露天風呂, rotenburo) called 'Kappa-no-yu'. The outdoor baths 'Oku-yagen Onsen Rest House' and 'Fufu-kappa-no-yu' (Wedded Kappa Bath) are run by the municipality and are both located along the riverside.

Kappa-no-yu Hot Spring is located next to an abandoned inn. With little to no upkeep, this hot spring is closed and drained during the winter months. Clogging the drain will fill the pool in 7–8 hours, but the pool will need to be cleaned by removal of leaves and twigs prior to use. The water is can be enjoyed during the winter months. During the summer it can be too hot to get into. Public transportation to the onsen is provided by Shimokita Kōtsu buses to Ōhata from Shimokita Station on the Ōminato Line of East Japan Railway Company.

== History ==
The onsen was discovered in 1615 by an ally of Hideyori Toyotomi, who retreated here after the defeat of the Toyotomi forces at the summer siege of Osaka Castle. The onsen was named after a tool used in the making of traditional herbal medicine, which it resembled.

Oku-yagen Onsen claims an even older history. In 862, Jikaku Daishi, who discovered Osorezan, suffered a great injury after he got lost. The story is that he was saved by a kappa (water imp) who immersed him in the waters of the 'Kappa-no-yu' bath, thereby healing his injury.
