= Mutsu Bay =

Bay in Aomori, Japan

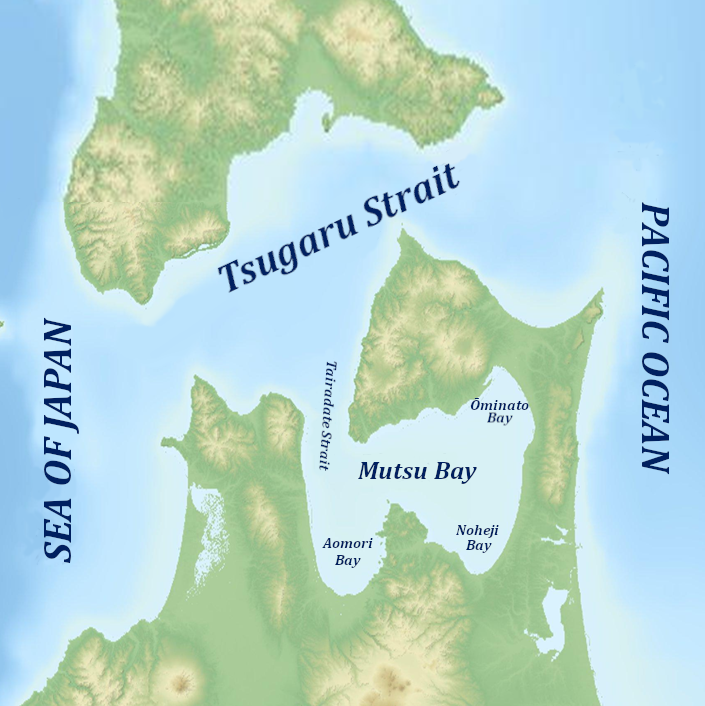
- A map of Mutsu Bay and its surroundings

- Location within Japan
- Location: Aomori Prefecture, Japan
- Coordinates: 40°59′N 140°58′E
- Ocean/sea sources: Pacific Ocean
- Basin countries: Japan
- Max. length: 40 km (24.85 mi)
- Max. width: 40 km (24.85 mi)
- Surface area: 1,668 km^{2} (644 mi^{2})
- Average depth: 40 m (130 ft)
- Settlements: Aomori, Mutsu

Mutsu Bay (陸奥湾, Mutsu-wan) is a bay located within Aomori Prefecture, in the northern Tōhoku region of northern Japan. It has an east–west distance of approximately 40 kilometers (22 nmi; 25 mi) and a north–south distance of approximately 40 kilometers (22 nmi; 25 mi) at its eastern end, with a total area of approximately 1,667.89 square kilometers (486.28 sq nmi; 643.98 sq mi).

== Names ==
Mutsu Bay is the dominant English term used in English for the body of water; however, it has historically been referred to as the Gulf of Mutsu. The Japanese name for the body of water is Mutsu-wan (陸奥湾).

== Geography ==
Mutsu Bay is bordered by the Tsugaru Peninsula to the west and the Shimokita Peninsula to the east and north. It has an east–west distance of approximately 40 kilometers (22 nmi; 25 mi) and a north–south distance of approximately 40 kilometers (22 nmi; 25 mi) at its eastern end, with a total area of approximately 1,667.89 square kilometers (486.28 sq nmi; 643.98 sq mi). The outlet of the bay is the 14-kilometer (7.6 nmi; 8.7 mi) wide Tairadate Strait which connects Mutsu Bay to the Tsugaru Strait separating the islands of Honshu and Hokkaido. The bay has an average depth of 40 to 45 meters (131 to 148 ft), with a maximum depth of 70 meters (230 ft) near its outlet to the Tsugaru Strait.

Mutsu Bay includes Aomori Bay in the southwest, Noheji Bay in the southeast, and Ōminato Bay to the northeast.

== Resources ==
Economically, the shallow waters of the bay are an important fishery, with the cultivation of scallops predominating. Other products commercially harvested include sea cucumber, olive flounder and Ascidiacea. The fisheries were severely damaged by the 2010 Northern Hemisphere summer heat waves.

In the year 2002, the Ministry of the Environment classified some tidal flats of the eastern Mutsu Bay shoreline to be one of the 500 Important Wetlands in Japan.

Pacific white-sided dolphins are regular migrants into the bay annually, and whale watching and surveys using ferries have been conducted.

== Gallery ==
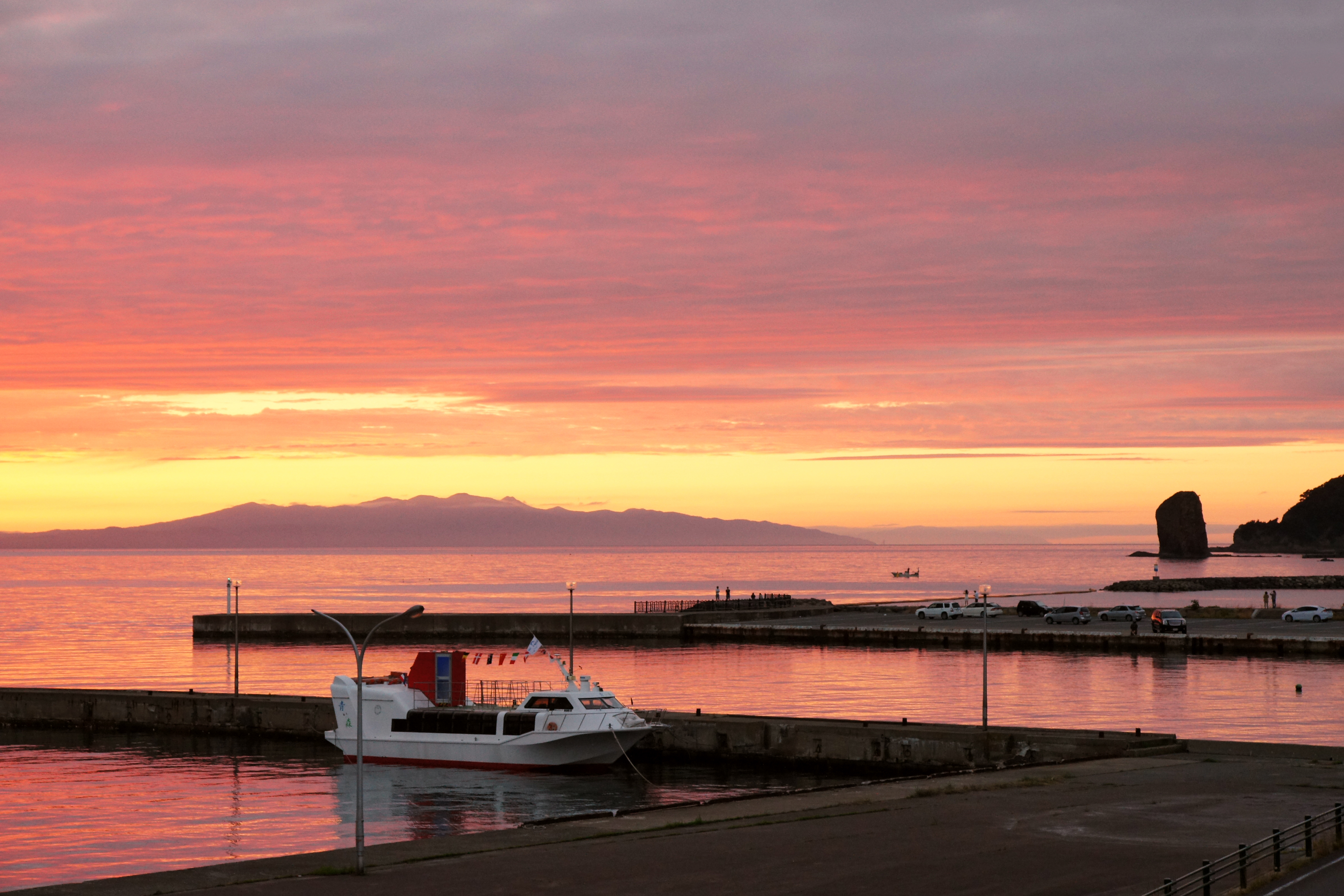
Mutsu Bay from Asamushi Onsen

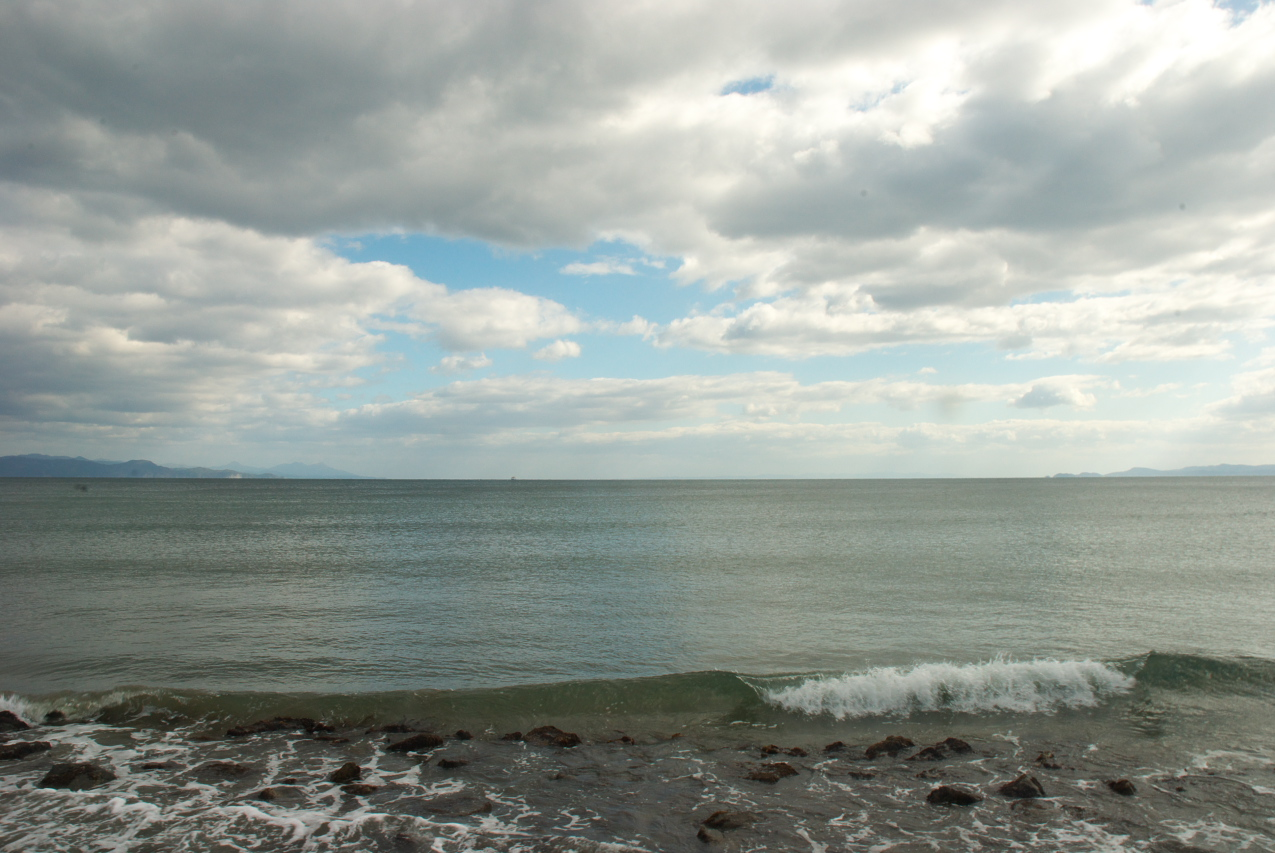
Mutsu Bay

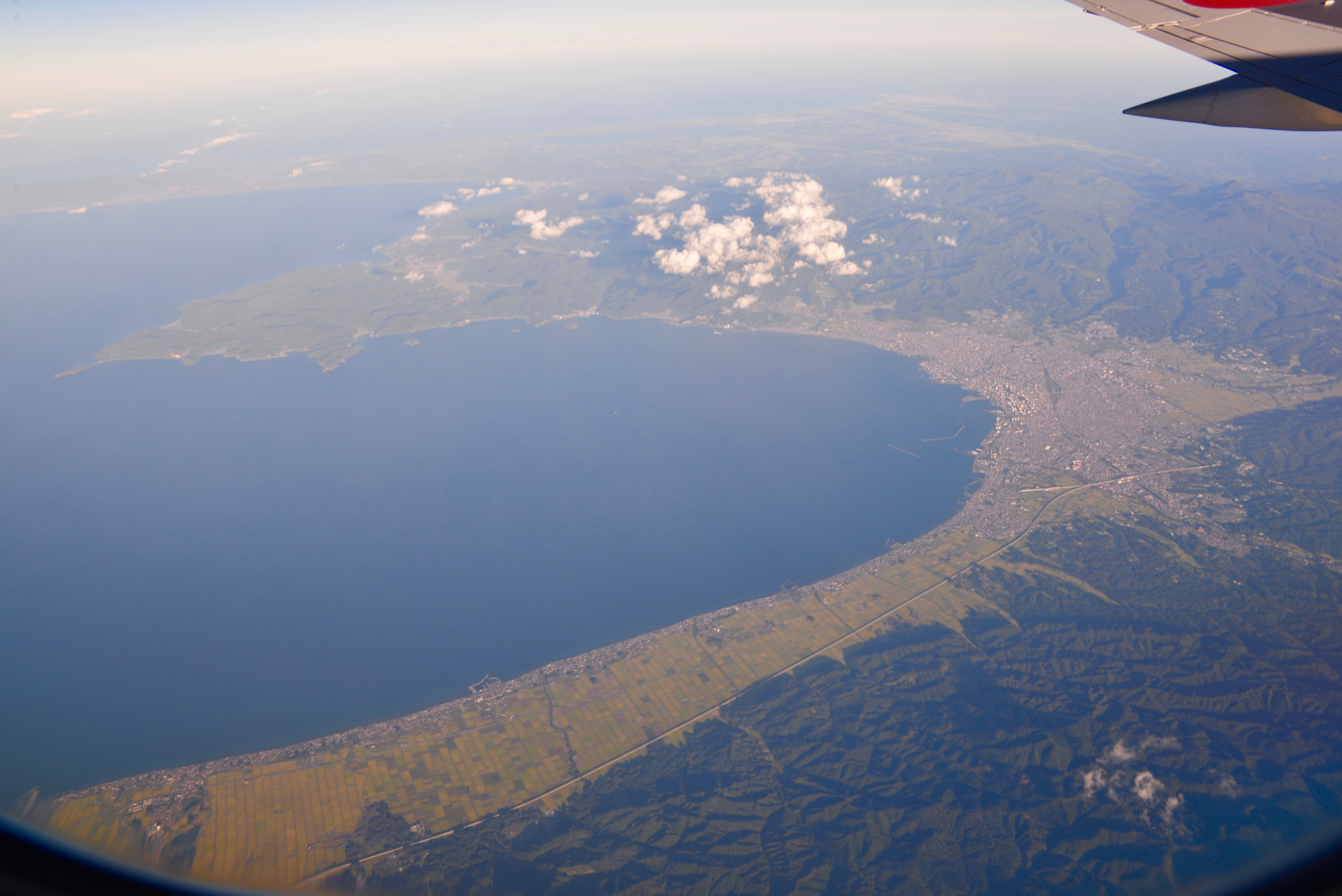
The southern part of Mutsu Bay as seen from the air over the Tsugaru Peninsula. Aomori Bay is in the center of the photograph with Noheji Bay in the top left corner.
