= Shimokita Peninsula =

Peninsula in Japan

Coordinates: 41°32′47″N 140°54′47″E

- Peninsula
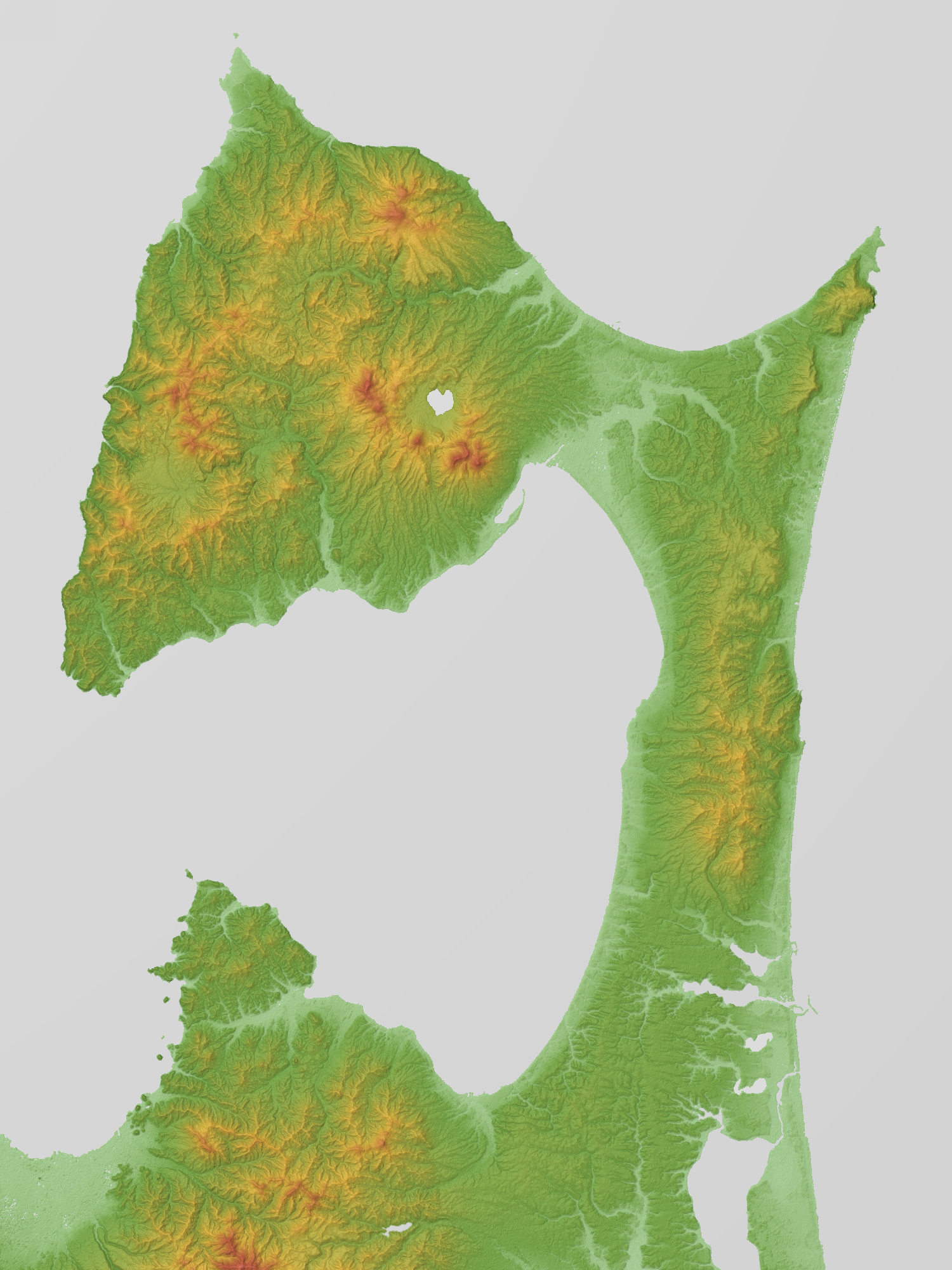
- Topographic map

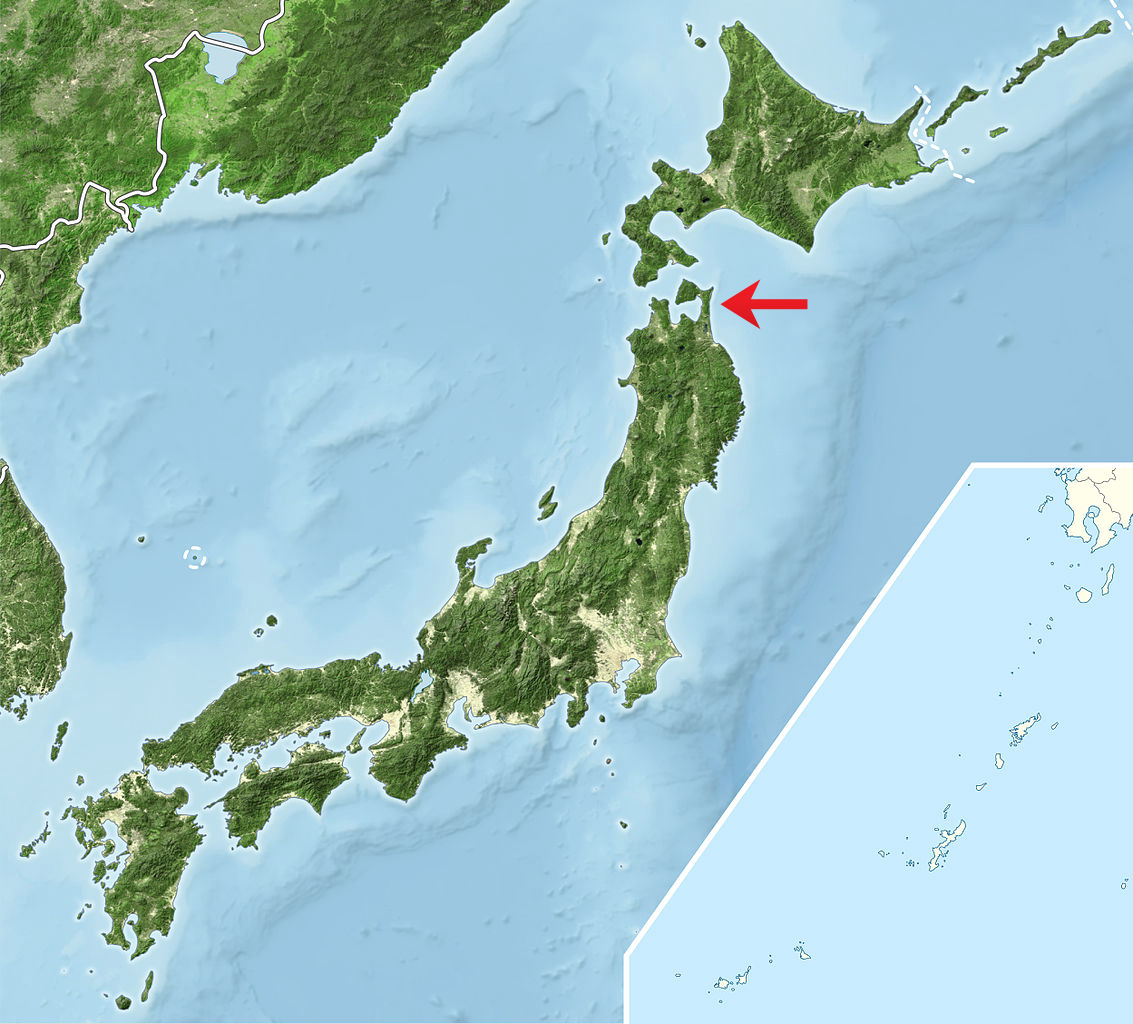
- Location of Shimokita Peninsula in Japan
- Location: Aomori Prefecture, Japan

Area
  - Total: 1,876.86 square kilometres (724.66 sq mi)
- Highest elevation: 879 meters (Mount Kamafuse)

The Shimokita Peninsula (下北半島, Shimokita-hantō) is the remote northeastern cape of the Japanese island of Honshū, stretching out towards Hokkaido.

== Overview ==
Location of Shimokita Peninsula

It is bordered by the Pacific Ocean to the east, Tsugaru Strait to the north and Mutsu Bay to the west and south. Shaped like an axe pointing west, the peninsula has a thin "axe handle" connecting the mountainous "axe blade" to the mainland of Honshū to the south. The peninsula contains the northernmost point on Honshū, Cape Ōma, and the largest sand dunes in Japan (the Sarugamori Sand Dunes).

The peninsula owes its name to its being the lower (shimo) portion of the former Kita District (North District) of Mutsu Province before the premodern province was divided in 1868.

Administratively the area is a part of Aomori Prefecture, and the bulk of the area falls within the jurisdiction of the city of Mutsu, with a number of small towns and villages along the periphery. Most of the inhabitants live in coastal areas rather than the mountainous interior.

Portions of the peninsula are within the borders of Shimokita Hantō Quasi-National Park, including Cape Ōma, the coastline of the village of Sai to the south, including seaside cliffs said to resemble Buddhas at Hotokegaura, Cape Shiriya to the northeast, and the volcanic interior of the peninsula, including Mount Osore and Lake Usori. Tourist attractions include Yagen Valley, known for its hot springs.

Economically, the mainstays of the local economy are commercial fishing, forestry, and seasonal tourism. The main commercial centre is the city of Mutsu. The village of Rokkasho, at the southern end of Shimokita Peninsula, is home to a range of nuclear facilities.

In 2012, Japan set a new world record for ocean drilling depth, reaching 2,111 meters below the seafloor off Shimokita Peninsula.

Since the Eemian interglacial some 125,000 years ago the coast of the eastern tip of the peninsula has been uplifted on average 0.14–0.25 meters every thousand years (m/kyr). Slightly to the west the a north-facing sandy coast has uplift rates of 0.14–0.23 m/kyr for the same period. Further to the west, on top of the trace line of the volcanic front rates over the same period are in the order of 0.09–0.18 m/kyr. This uplift is related to the activity of offshore geological faults that has bended strata into an anticline.

This peninsula is also called "Axe Peninsula" from the shape.

== See also ==
- Shimokita District (the peninsula proper)
- Kamikita District (the isthmus connecting the peninsula to Honshu)
