= Shimokita (train) =

Japanese rapid train service

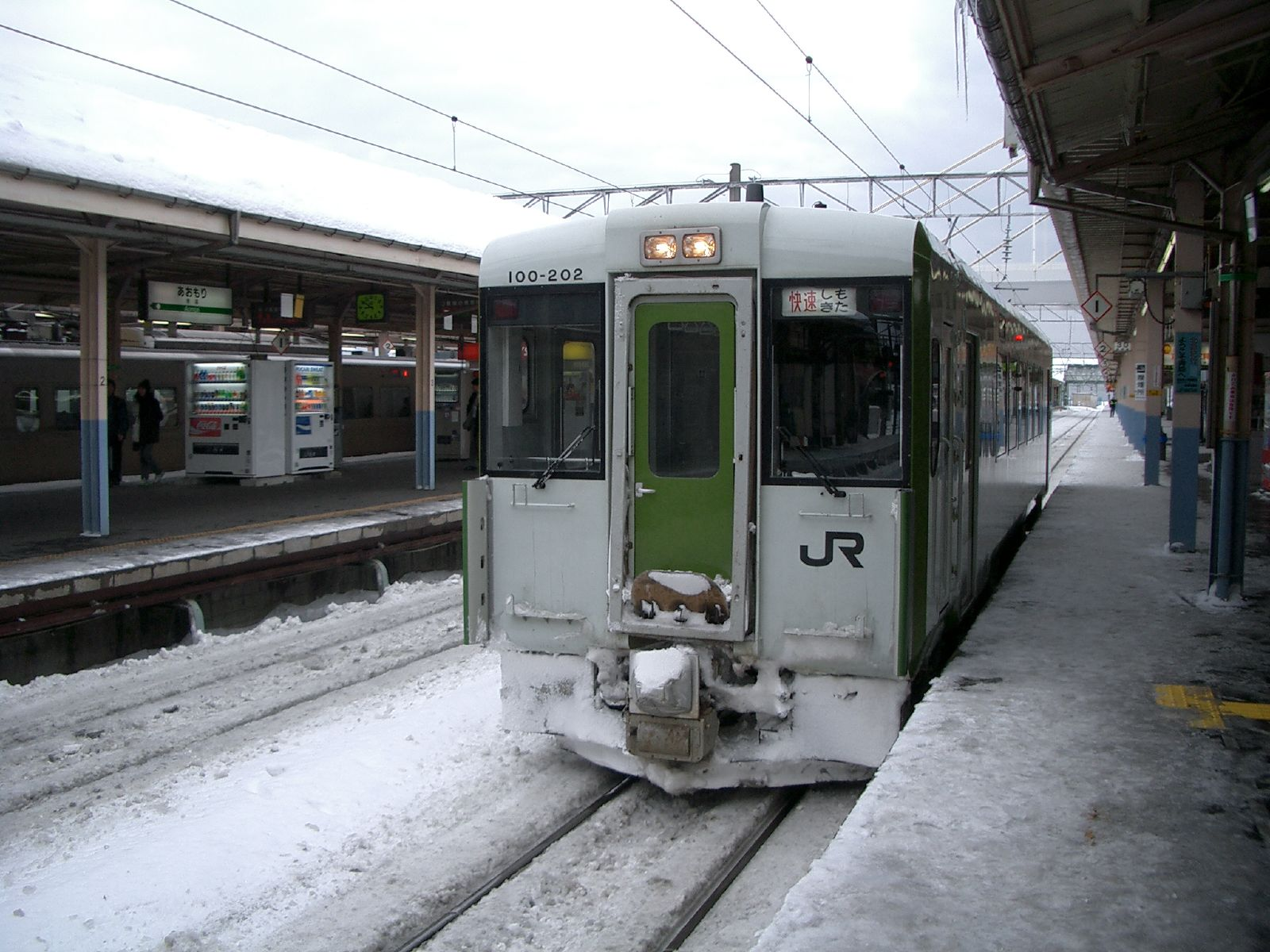
- JR East KiHa 100 series DMU car KiHa 100-202 at Aomori Station on a Shimokita rapid service in February 2004

Overview
- Service type: Rapid
- Status: Operational
- Locale: Aomori Prefecture
- First service: 15 September 1961 (Semi express); 1 October 1966 (Express); 1 December 1993 (Rapid)
- Current operator(s): JR East; Aoimori Railway
- Former operator(s): JNR

Route
- Termini: Hachinohe; Ōminato
- Stops: 8
- Distance travelled: 109.7 km (68.2 mi)
- Service frequency: 3 round trip services daily to Hachinohe
- Line(s) used: Ōminato Line; Aoimori Railway Line

On-board services
- Class(es): Standard only
- Disabled access: Yes
- Sleeping arrangements: None
- Catering facilities: None
- Observation facilities: None
- Entertainment facilities: None
- Other facilities: Toilets

Technical
- Rolling stock: KiHa 100 series DMUs
- Track gauge: 1,067 mm (3 ft 6 in)
- Electrification: None
- Operating speed: 100 km/h (62 mph)

The Shimokita (しもきた) is a "Rapid" limited-stop train service in Japan operated by East Japan Railway Company (JR East) and Aoimori Railway Company, which runs from Hachinohe to Ōminato via the Aoimori Railway Line and the Ōminato Line.

== Service pattern ==
There are three daily round trip services to Hachinohe.

== Station list ==
| Station | Japanese | Distance (km) | | Transfers, Notes | Location | |
| Station | Japanese | Between stations | Total | Transfers, Notes | Location | |
|---|---|---|---|---|---|---|
| Hachinohe | 八戸 | - | 0.0 | Tōhoku Shinkansen, Hachinohe Line, Aoimori Railway Line | Hachinohe | Aomori |
| Shimoda | 下田 | 11.1 | 11.1 | | Oirase | Aomori |
| Misawa | 三沢 | 9.9 | 21 | | Misawa | Aomori |
| Kamikitachō | 上北町 | 10.5 | 31.5 | | Tōhoku | Aomori |
| Ottomo | 乙供 | 6.9 | 38.4 | (limited service) | Tōhoku | Aomori |
| Noheji | 野辺地 | 19.9 | 51.4 | Aoimori Railway Line ↑, Ōminato Line ↓ | Noheji | Aomori |
| Mutsu-Yokohama | 陸奥横浜 | 30.1 | 81.5 | | Yokohama | Aomori |
| Chikagawa | 近川 | 12.6 | 94.1 | (limited service) | Mutsu | Aomori |
| Shimokita | 下北 | 25.3 | 106.8 | | Mutsu | Aomori |
| Ōminato | 大湊 | 2.9 | 109.7 | | Mutsu | Aomori |

== History ==
=== Semi express (1961–1965) ===
The Shimokita name was first used on 15 September 1961 for a semi express service which operated between Morioka in Iwate Prefecture and Ōwani in Aomori Prefecture via Aomori. This was discontinued on 30 September 1965, replaced by the Michinoku service.

=== Express (1966–1982) ===
The Shimokita name was subsequently used from 1 October 1966 for an express service which operated between Morioka and Ikarigaseki in the down direction and between Ōwani and Morioka in the up direction. This was discontinued on 14 November 1982.

=== Rapid (1993–present) ===
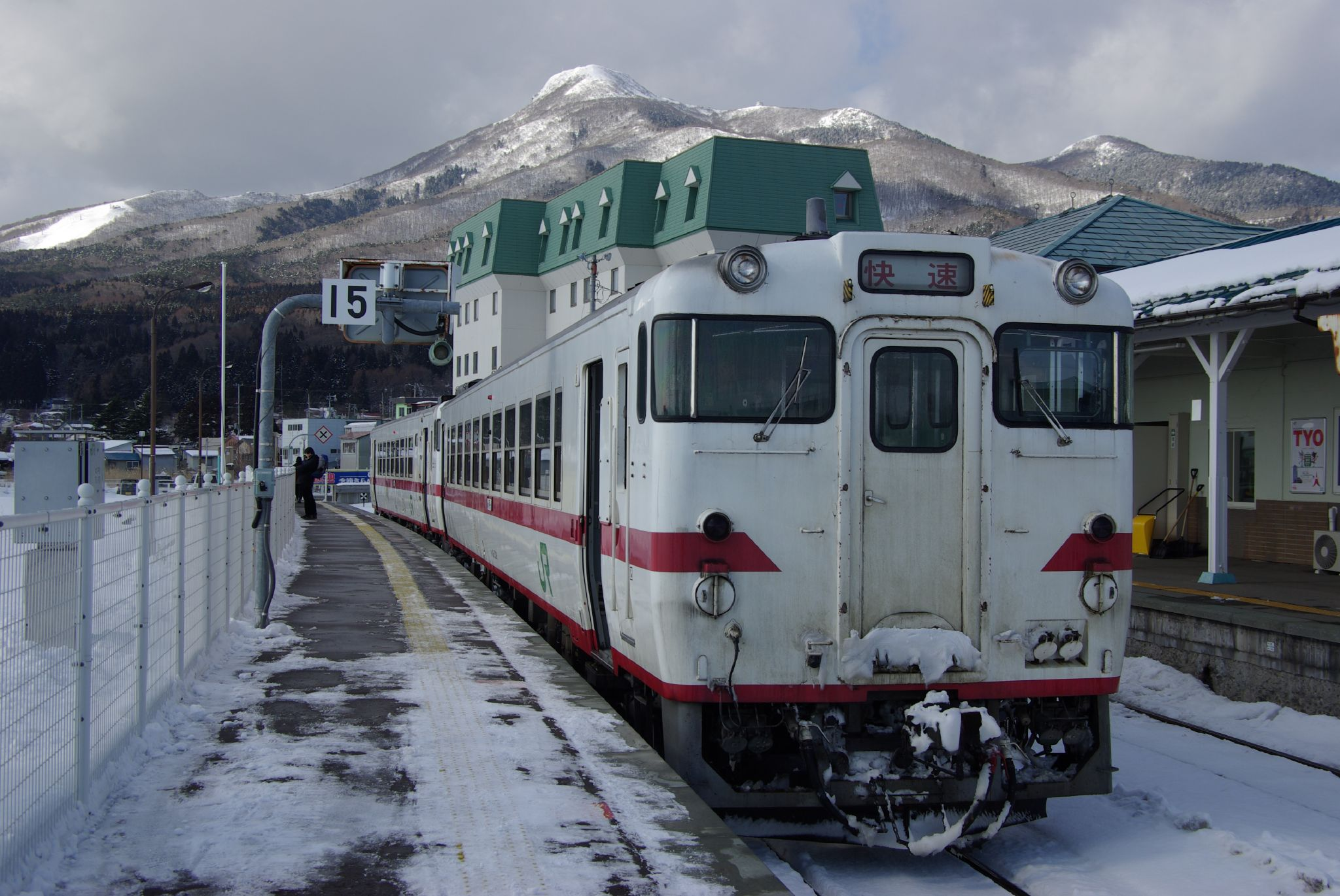
A JR East KiHa 40 series DMU set on a Shimokita service in 2008

The Shimokita name was revived in 1993 when new KiHa 100 series DMU trains were introduced on the former Usori rapid services operating between Ōminato, Noheji, and Aomori. On 13 March 2021, the Shimokita service operated jointly by JR East and the Aoimori Railway between Aomori and Ōminato was abolished, though the service continues to operate between Hachinohe and Ōminato.

== See also ==
- List of named passenger trains of Japan
