= Fukkoshi Station =

Railway station in Yokohama, Aomori Prefecture, Japan

Fukkoshi Station 吹越駅
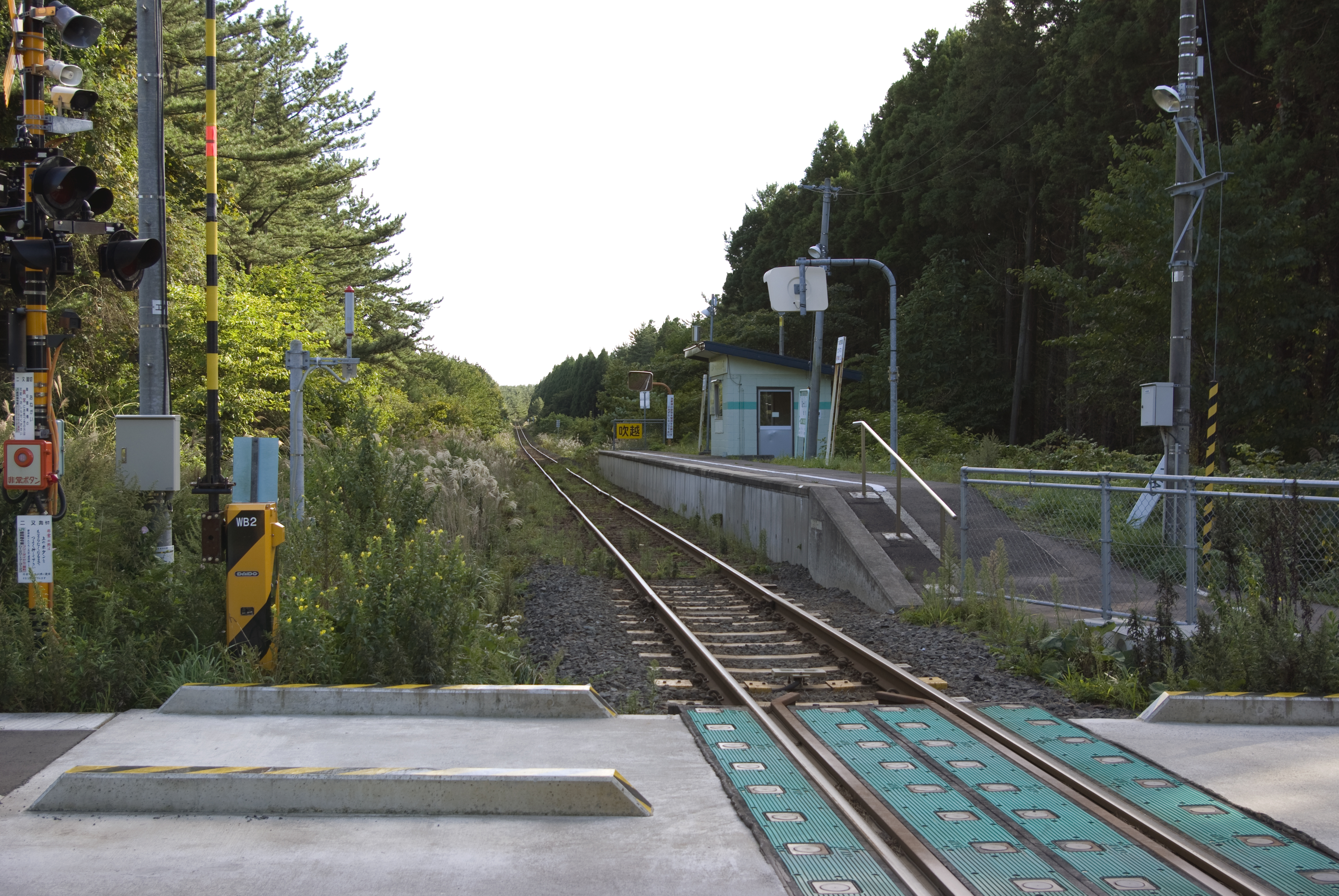
- Fukkoshi Station in September 2009

General information
- Location: Fukkoshi, Yokohama-machi, Kamikita-gun, Aomori-ken 039-4153; Japan
- Coordinates: 41°01′19.05″N 141°14′47.51″E
- Operator: JR East
- Line: ■ Ōminato Line
- Distance: 23.0 km from Noheji
- Platforms: 1 side platform
- Tracks: 1

Construction
- Structure type: At grade

Other information
- Status: Unstaffed
- Website: Official website

History
- Opened: March 10, 1943

Services
Preceding station	JR East	Following station
Arito towards Noheji	Ōminato Line	Mutsu-Yokohama towards Ōminato
Location
- Location within Aomori Prefecture Location within Japan

Fukkoshi Station (吹越駅, Fukkoshi-eki) is a railway station in the town of Yokohama, Kamikita District, Aomori Prefecture, Japan, operated by East Japan Railway Company (JR East).

== Lines ==
Fukkoshi Station is served by the Ōminato Line, and is located 23.0 kilometers from the terminus of the line at Noheji Station.

== Station layout ==
The station has one ground-level side platform serving a single bidirectional track. There is no station building, but only a small rain shelter for passengers on the platform. The station is unattended.

== History ==
Fukkoshi Station was opened on September 25, 1921. With the privatization of Japanese National Railways (JNR) on April 1, 1987, the station came under the operational control of JR East.

== Surrounding area ==
- National Route 279

== See also ==
- List of railway stations in Japan
