= Arito Station =

Railway station in Noheji, Aomori Prefecture, Japan

Arito Station 有戸駅
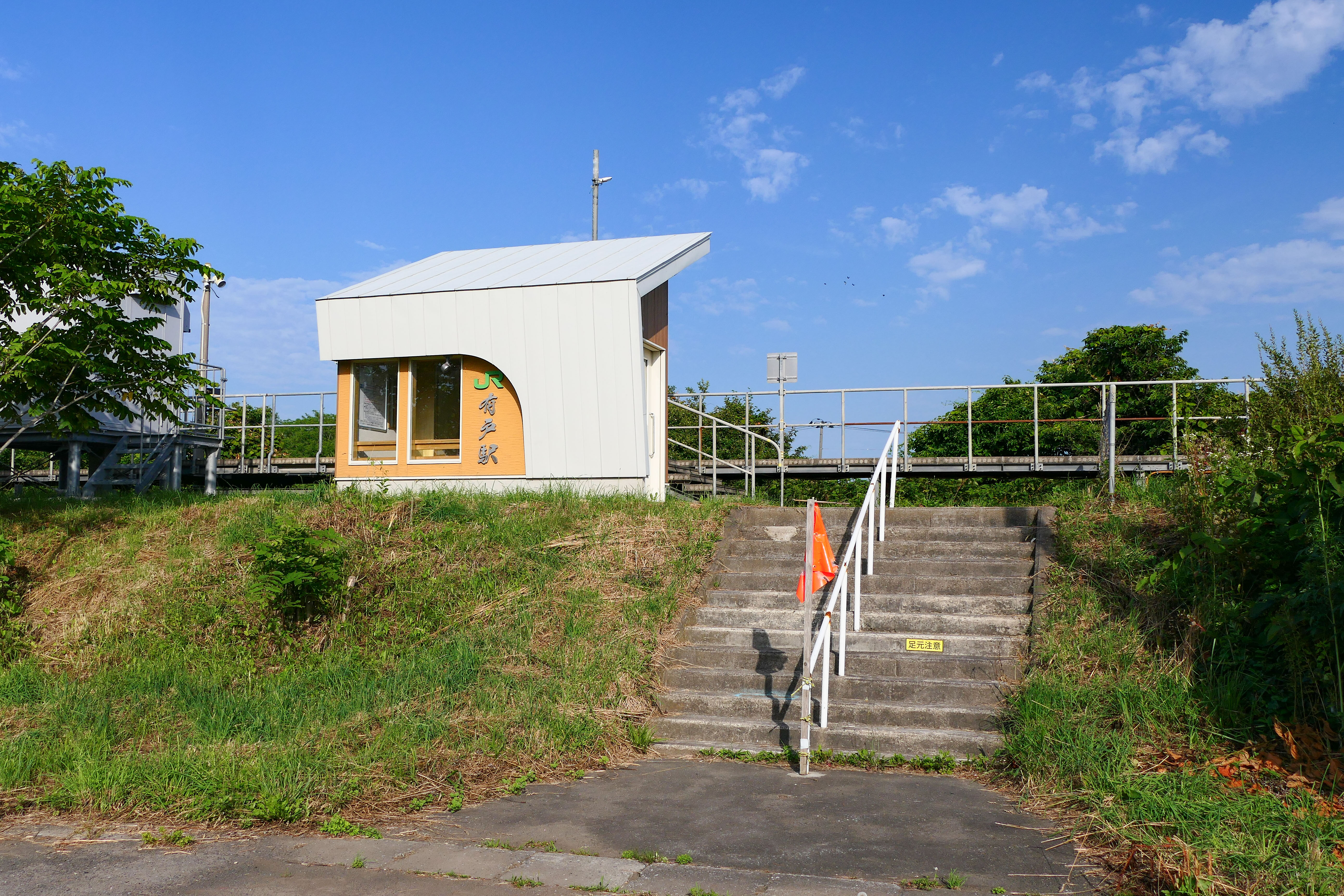
- Arito Station in July 2013

General information
- Location: Ozawadai, Noheji-machi, Kamikita-gun, Aomori-ken 039-3107; Japan
- Coordinates: 40°54′51.27″N 141°11′22.14″E
- Operator: JR East
- Line: ■ Ōminato Line
- Distance: 9.6 km from Noheji
- Platforms: 1 side platform
- Tracks: 1

Construction
- Structure type: At grade

Other information
- Status: Unstaffed
- Website: Official website

History
- Opened: March 20, 1921

Services
Preceding station	JR East	Following station
Kita-Noheji towards Noheji	Ōminato Line	Fukkoshi towards Ōminato
Location
- Location within Aomori Prefecture Location within Japan

Arito Station (有戸駅, Arito-eki) is a railway station in the town of Noheji, Kamikita District, Aomori Prefecture, Japan, operated by East Japan Railway Company (JR East).

== Lines ==
Arito Station is served by the Ōminato Line, and is located 9.6 kilometers from the terminus of the line at Noheji Station.

== Station layout ==
The station has a single ground-level side platform serving a single bidirectional track. The station is unattended.

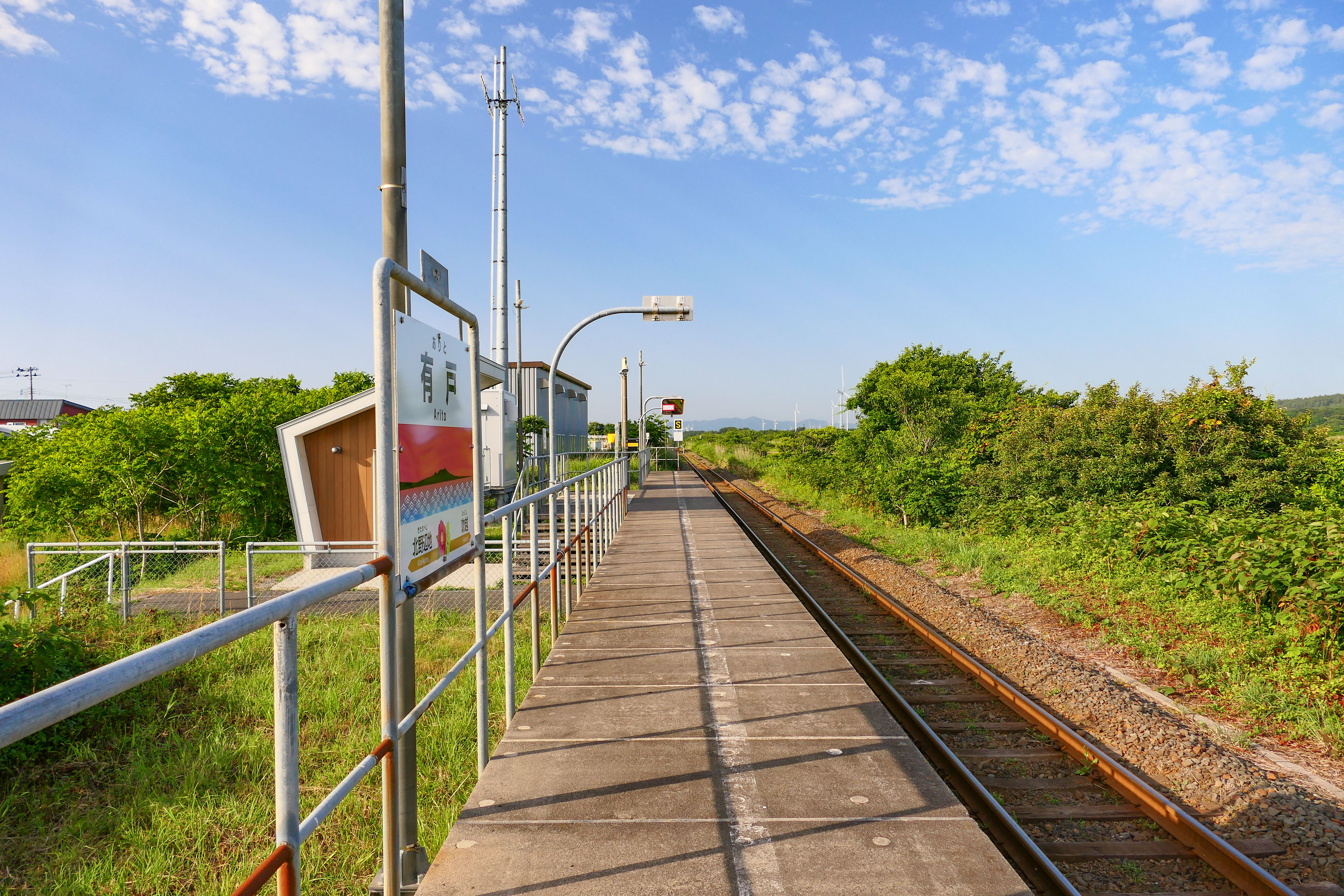
Platform

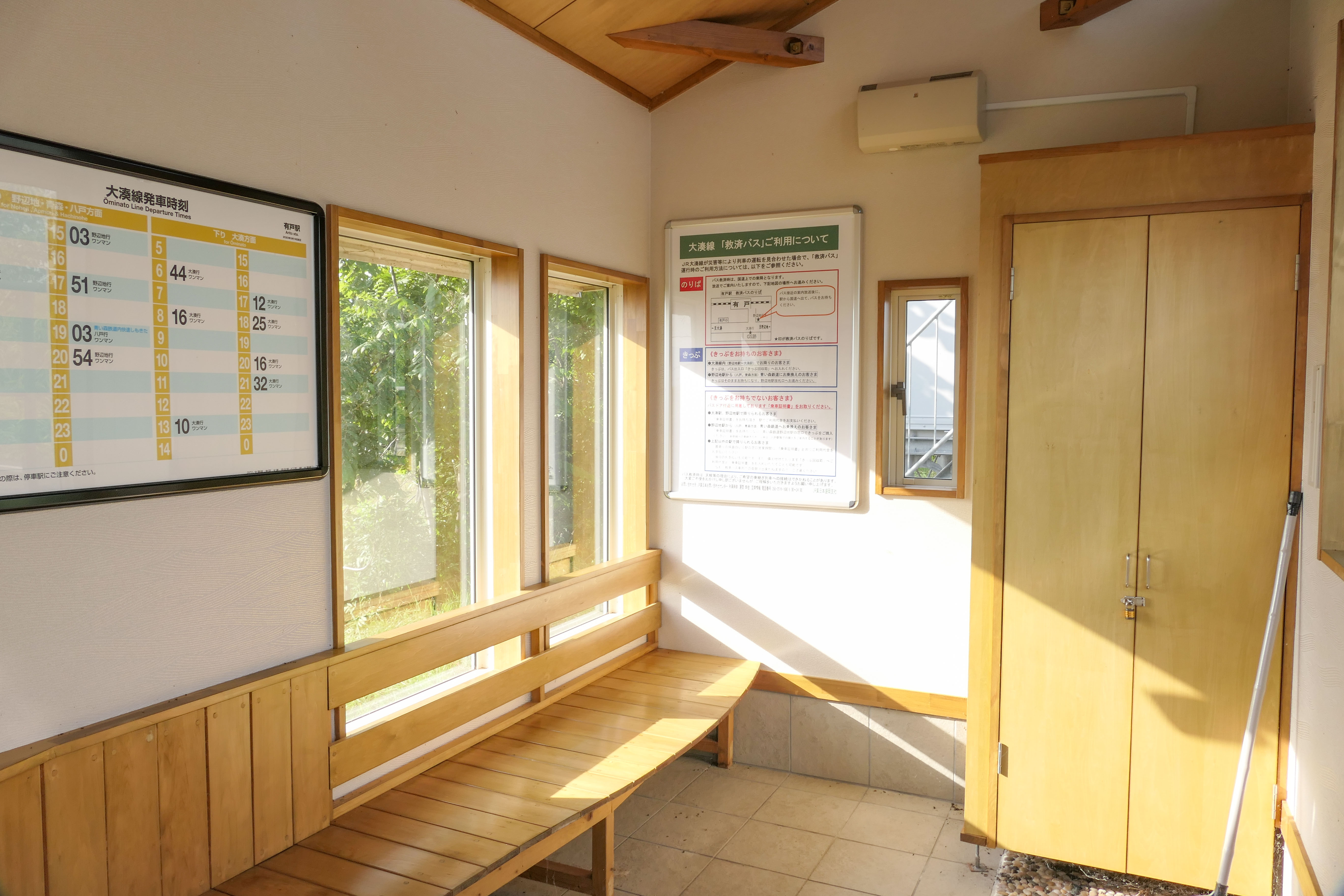
Inside station building

== History ==
Arito Station was opened on March 20, 1921, as a station on the Japanese Government Railways (JGR). Freight services were discontinued on March 15, 1972. With the privatization of the Japanese National Railways (JNR) on April 1, 1987, it came under the operational control of JR East.

== Surrounding area ==
- Mutsu Bay
- National Route 279

== See also ==
- List of railway stations in Japan
