= Mutsu-Yokohama Station =

Railway station in Yokohama, Aomori Prefecture, Japan

Mutsu-Yokohama Station 陸奥横浜駅
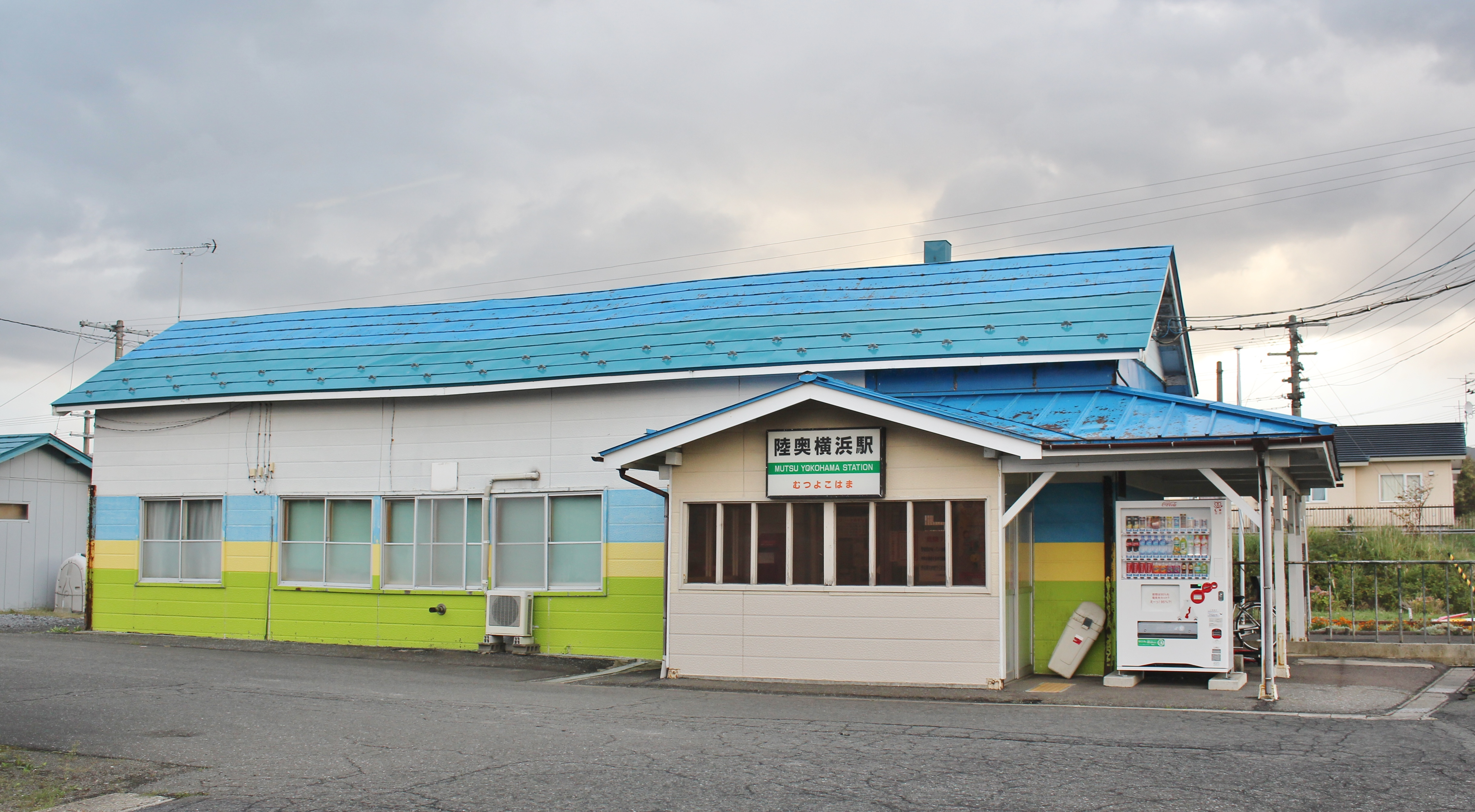
- Mutsu-Yokohama Station in October 2013

General information
- Location: Tatenoshiro 21, Yokohama-machi, Kamikita-gun, Aomori-ken 039-4133; Japan
- Coordinates: 41°05′12.09″N 141°14′59.67″E
- Operator: JR East
- Line: ■ Ōminato Line
- Distance: 30.1 km from Noheji
- Platforms: 1 island platform
- Tracks: 2

Construction
- Structure type: At grade

Other information
- Status: Unattended
- Website: Official website

History
- Opened: 20 March 1921

Passengers
- FY2018: 70 (daily)

Services
Preceding station	JR East	Following station
Noheji Terminus	Shimokita	Chikagawa (limited service) towards Ōminato
Fukkoshi towards Noheji	Ōminato Line	Arihata towards Ōminato
Location
- Location within Aomori Prefecture Location within Japan

Mutsu-Yokohama Station (陸奥横浜駅, Mutsu-Yokohama-eki) is a railway station in the town of Yokohama, Kamikita District, Aomori Prefecture, Japan, operated by East Japan Railway Company (JR East).

== Lines ==
Mutsu-Yokohama Station is served by the Ōminato Line, and is located 30.1 kilometers from the official starting point of the line at Noheji Station. It is also served by the Shimokita express train service connecting Hachinohe with Ōminato

== Station layout ==
The station has a single unnumbered island platform serving two tracks, with a small spur line for trains to be taken off the main rails for maintenance. The platform is connected to the small station building by a level crossing. The station is unattended.

=== Platforms ===
Station side	■ Ōminato Line	for Shimokita and Ōminato
Opposite side	■ Ōminato Line	for Noheji and Aomori

== History ==
Mutsu-Yokohama Station was opened on March 20, 1921 as a station on the Japanese Government Railways (JGR). All freight operations were discontinued as of March 15, 1973. With the privatization of the Japanese National Railways (JNR) on April 1, 1987, it came under the operational control of JR East.

== Surrounding area ==
- Yokohama Town Hall
- Yokohama Post Office

== Passenger statistics ==
In fiscal 2018, the station was used by an average of 70 passengers daily (boarding passengers only).

== In popular culture ==
Mutsu-Yokohama Station was the setting of episode 18 and the final episode of the TV anime series Clannad-After Story broadcast from 2008 to 2009. The series also featured the rapeseed fields of Yokohama, and continues to draw fans to the station.

== See also ==
- List of railway stations in Japan
