= Kanayasawa Station =

Railway station in Mutsu, Aomori Prefecture, Japan

Kanayasawa Station 金谷沢駅
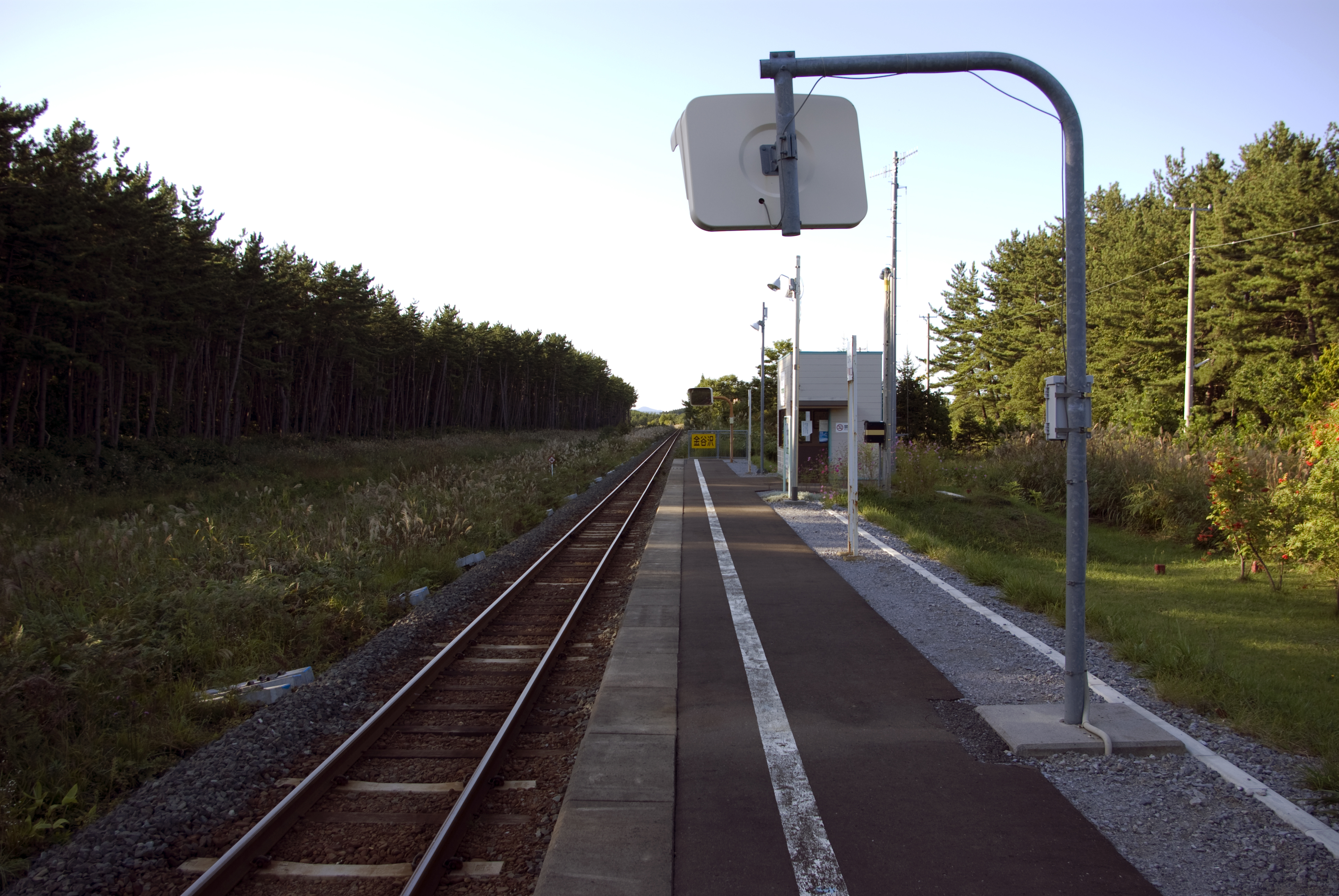
- Kanayasawa Station in September 2009

General information
- Location: Okunai Kanayasawa, Mutsu-shi, Aomori-ken 035-0011; Japan
- Coordinates: 41°13′44.74″N 141°14′53.55″E
- Operator: JR East
- Line: ■ Ōminato Line
- Distance: 47.7 km from Noheji
- Platforms: 1 side platform
- Tracks: 1

Construction
- Structure type: At grade

Other information
- Status: Unstaffed
- Website: Official website

History
- Opened: June 10, 1953

Services
Preceding station	JR East	Following station
Chikagawa towards Noheji	Ōminato Line	Akagawa towards Ōminato
Location
- Location within Aomori Prefecture Location within Japan

Kanayasawa Station (金谷沢駅, Kanayasawa-eki) is a railway station in the city of Mutsu, Aomori Prefecture, Japan, operated by East Japan Railway Company (JR East).

== Lines ==
Kanayasawa Station is served by the Ōminato Line, and is located 47.7 kilometers from the terminus of the line at Noheji Station.

== Station layout ==
The station has one ground-level side platform serving a single bidirectional track. The station has no station building, but only a small rain shelter for passengers on the platform. The station is unattended.

== History ==
Kanayasawa Station was opened on June 10, 1953. With the privatization of the Japanese National Railways on April 1, 1987, it came under the operational control of JR East.

== Surrounding area ==
- National Route 279
- Mutsu Bay

== See also ==
- List of railway stations in Japan
