= Chikagawa Station =

Railway station in Mutsu, Aomori Prefecture, Japan

Chikagawa Station 近川駅
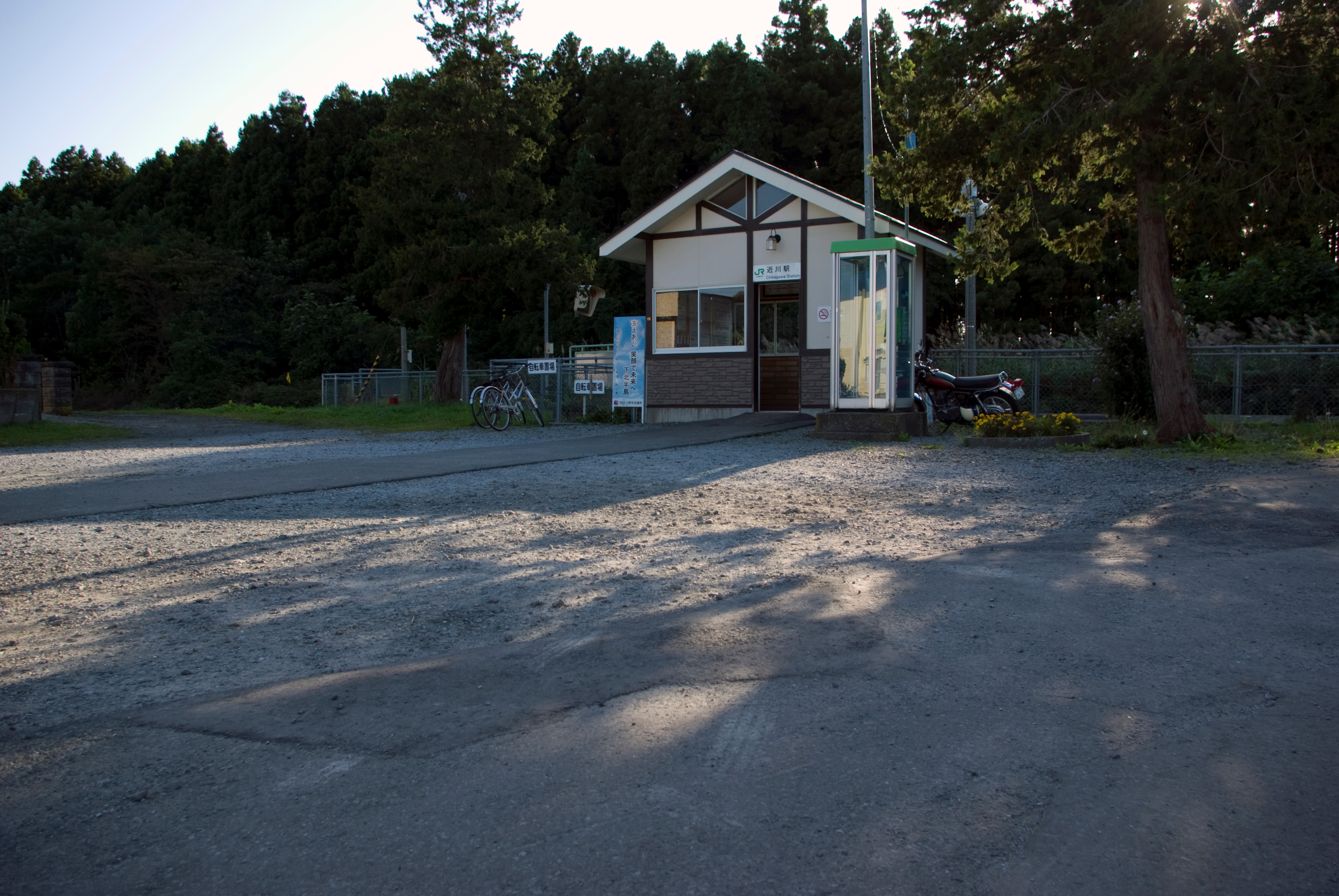
- Chikagawa Station in September 2009

General information
- Location: Okunai Chikagawa, Mutsu-shi, Aomori-ken 035-0011; Japan
- Coordinates: 41°11′28.90″N 141°16′45.35″E
- Operator: JR East
- Line: ■ Ōminato Line
- Distance: 42.7 km from Noheji
- Platforms: 1 side platform
- Tracks: 1

Construction
- Structure type: At grade

Other information
- Status: Unstaffed
- Website: Official website

History
- Opened: September 25, 1921

Services
Preceding station	JR East	Following station
Mutsu-Yokohama towards Noheji	Shimokita (limited service)	Shimokita towards Ōminato
Arihata towards Noheji	Ōminato Line	Kanayasawa towards Ōminato
Location
- Location within Aomori Prefecture Location within Japan

Chikagawa Station (近川駅, Chikagawa-eki) is a railway station in the city of Mutsu, Aomori Prefecture, Japan, operated by East Japan Railway Company (JR East).

== Lines ==
Chikagawa Station is served by the Ōminato Line, and is located 43.7 kilometers from the terminus of the line at Noheji Station.

== Station layout ==
Although originally built with two opposed side platforms, at present Chikagawa Station has a single side platform serving bidirectional traffic. The station is unattended.

== History ==
Chikagawa Station was opened on September 25, 1921. With the privatization of Japanese National Railways (JNR) on April 1, 1987, the station came under the operational control of JR East.

== Surrounding area ==
- National Route 279
- JMSDF Communications Command Ominato Chikagawa Receiving Station

== See also ==
- List of railway stations in Japan
