= Akagawa Station =

Railway station in Mutsu, Aomori Prefecture, Japan

Akagawa Station 赤川駅
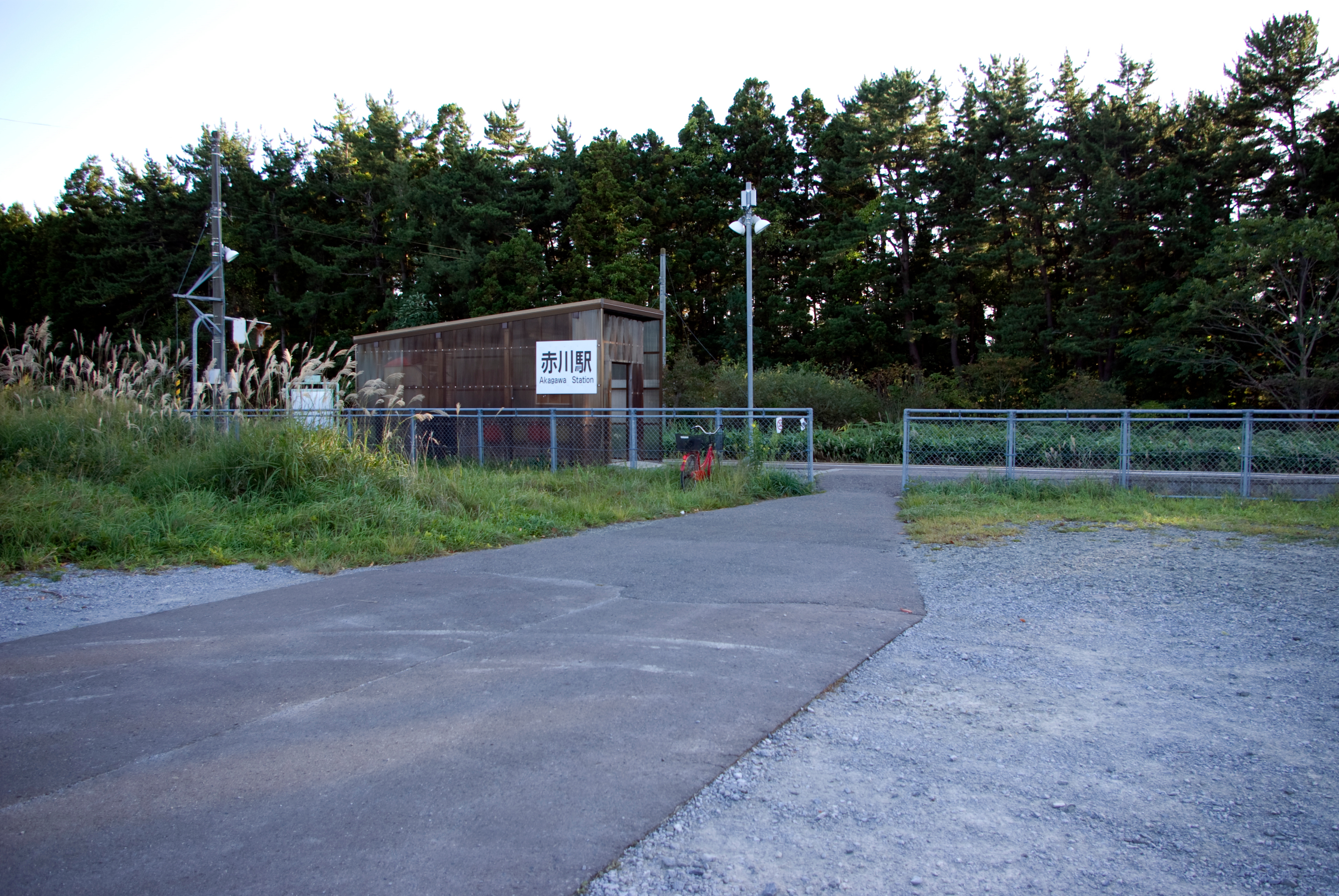
- Akagawa Station in September 2009

General information
- Location: 8 Akagawa-cho, Mutsu-shi, Aomori-ken 035-0044; Japan
- Coordinates: 41°16′4.60″N 141°12′33.49″E
- Operator: JR East
- Line: ■ Ōminato Line
- Distance: 53.2 km from Noheji
- Platforms: 1 side platform
- Tracks: 1

Construction
- Structure type: At grade

Other information
- Status: Unstaffed
- Website: Official website

History
- Opened: September 25, 1921
- Former names: Tanabu (until 1941)

Services
Preceding station	JR East	Following station
Kanayasawa towards Noheji	Ōminato Line	Shimokita towards Ōminato
Location
- Location within Aomori Prefecture Location within Japan

Akagawa Station (赤川駅, Akagawa-eki) is a railway station in the city of Mutsu, Aomori Prefecture, Japan, operated by East Japan Railway Company (JR East).

== Lines ==
Akagawa Station is served by the Ōminato Line, and is located 53.2 kilometers from the terminus of the line at Noheji Station.

== Station layout ==
The station has one ground-level side platform serving single bidirectional track. The station is unstaffed, and has no station building, but only an enclosed waiting room on the platform.

== History ==
The station was opened on September 25, 1921, as Tanabu Station (田名部駅). It was renamed Akagawa Station on December 1, 1941. With the privatization of Japanese National Railways on April 1, 1987, it came under the operational control of JR East.

== Surrounding area ==
- National Route 279
- Mutsu Bay

== See also ==
- List of railway stations in Japan
