= Arihata Station =

Railway station in Yokohama, Aomori Prefecture, Japan

Arihata Station 有畑駅
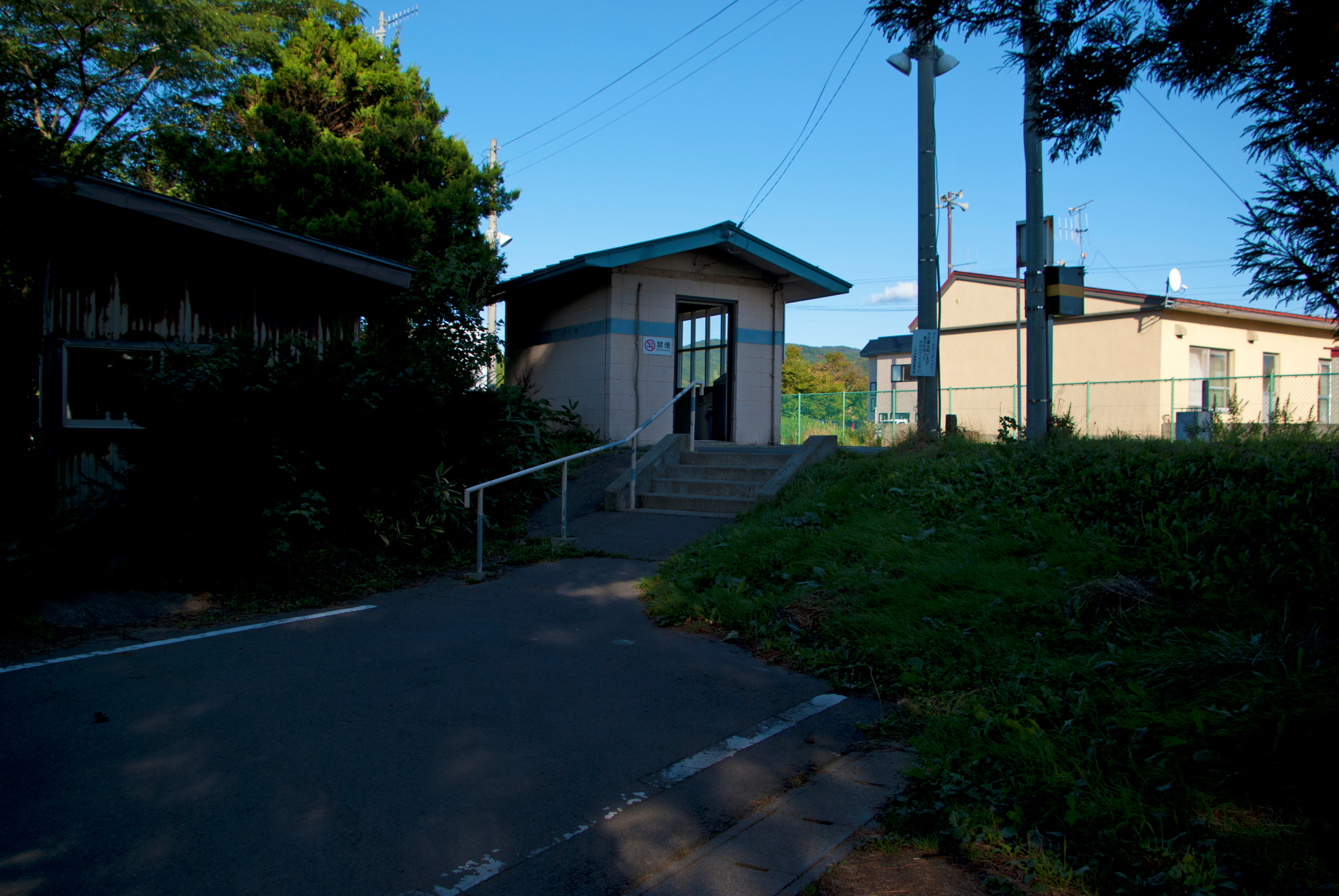
- Arihata Station in September 2009

General information
- Location: Arihata, Yokohama-machi, Kamikita-gun, Aomori-ken 039-4106; Japan
- Coordinates: 41°07′55.10″N 141°16′35.73″E
- Operator: JR East
- Line: ■ Ōminato Line
- Distance: 36.0 km from Noheji
- Platforms: 1 side platform
- Tracks: 1

Construction
- Structure type: At grade

Other information
- Status: Unstaffed
- Website: Official website

History
- Opened: June 10, 1946

Services
Preceding station	JR East	Following station
Mutsu-Yokohama towards Noheji	Ōminato Line	Chikagawa towards Ōminato
Location
- Location within Aomori Prefecture Location within Japan

Arihata Station (有畑駅, Arihata-eki) is a railway station in the town of Yokohama, Kamikita District, Aomori Prefecture, Japan, operated by East Japan Railway Company (JR East).

== Lines ==
Arihata Station is served by the Ōminato Line, and is located 36.0 kilometers from the terminus of the line at Noheji Station.

== Station layout ==
The station has one ground-level side platform serving a single bidirectional track. There is no station building, but only a small rain shelter for passengers on the platform. The station is unattended.

== History ==
Arihata Station was opened on June 10, 1946. With the privatization of the Japanese National Railways on April 1, 1987, it came under the operational control of JR East.

== Surrounding area ==
- National Route 279
- Arihata Elementary School

== See also ==
- List of railway stations in Japan
