= Kita-Noheji Station =

Railway station in Noheji, Aomori Prefecture, Japan

Kita-Noheji Station 北野辺地駅
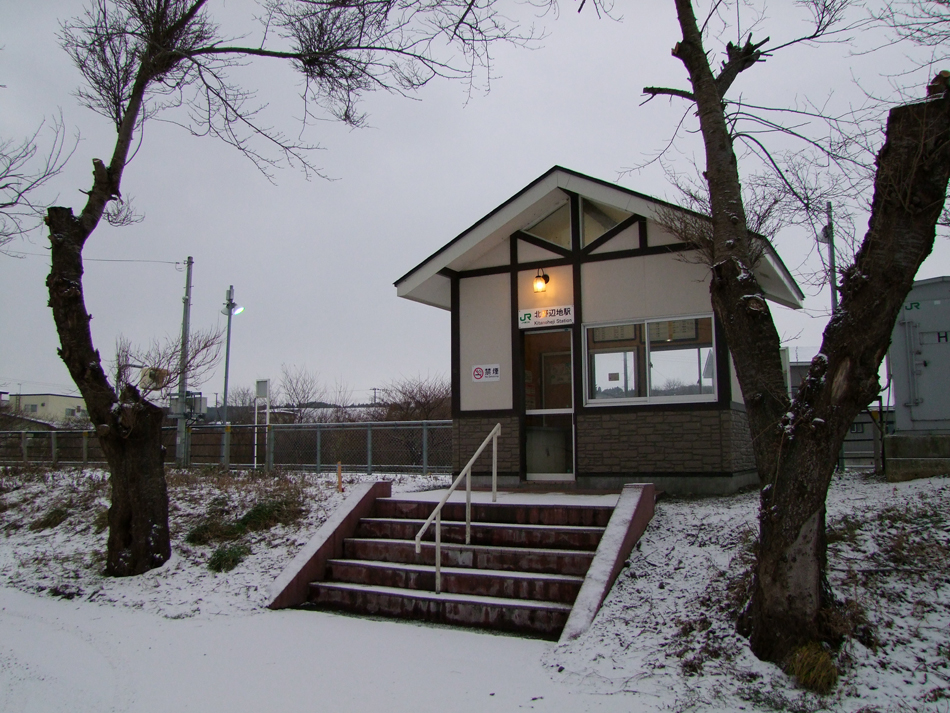
- Kita-Noheji Station

General information
- Location: Ishigamiura, Noheji-machi, Kamikita-gun Aomori-ken 039-3111; Japan
- Coordinates: 40°52′15.95″N 141°08′03.10″E
- Operator: JR East
- Line: ■ Ōminato Line
- Distance: 2.8 km from Noheji
- Platforms: 1 side platform

Construction
- Structure type: At grade

Other information
- Status: Unstaffed
- Website: Official website

History
- Opened: December 20, 1958

Services
Preceding station	JR East	Following station
Noheji Terminus	Ōminato Line	Arito towards Ōminato
Location
- Location within Aomori Prefecture Location within Japan

Kita-Noheji Station (北野辺地駅, Kita-Noheji-eki) is a railway station in the town of Noheji, Kamikita District, Aomori Prefecture, Japan, operated by East Japan Railway Company (JR East).

== Lines ==
Kita-Noheji Station is served by the Ōminato Line, and is located 2.8 kilometers from the terminus of the line at Noheji Station.

== Station layout ==
Kita-Noheji Station has one ground-level side platform serving a single bidirectional track. There is no station building, but only a small rain shelter for passengers on the platform. The station is unattended.

== History ==
The station was opened on December 20, 1958. With the privatization of the Japanese National Railways (JNR) on April 1, 1987, it came under the operational control of JR East.

== Surrounding area ==
- Noheji Town Hall
- National Route 279
- Wakaba Elementary School

== See also ==
- List of railway stations in Japan
