= Ōminato Line =

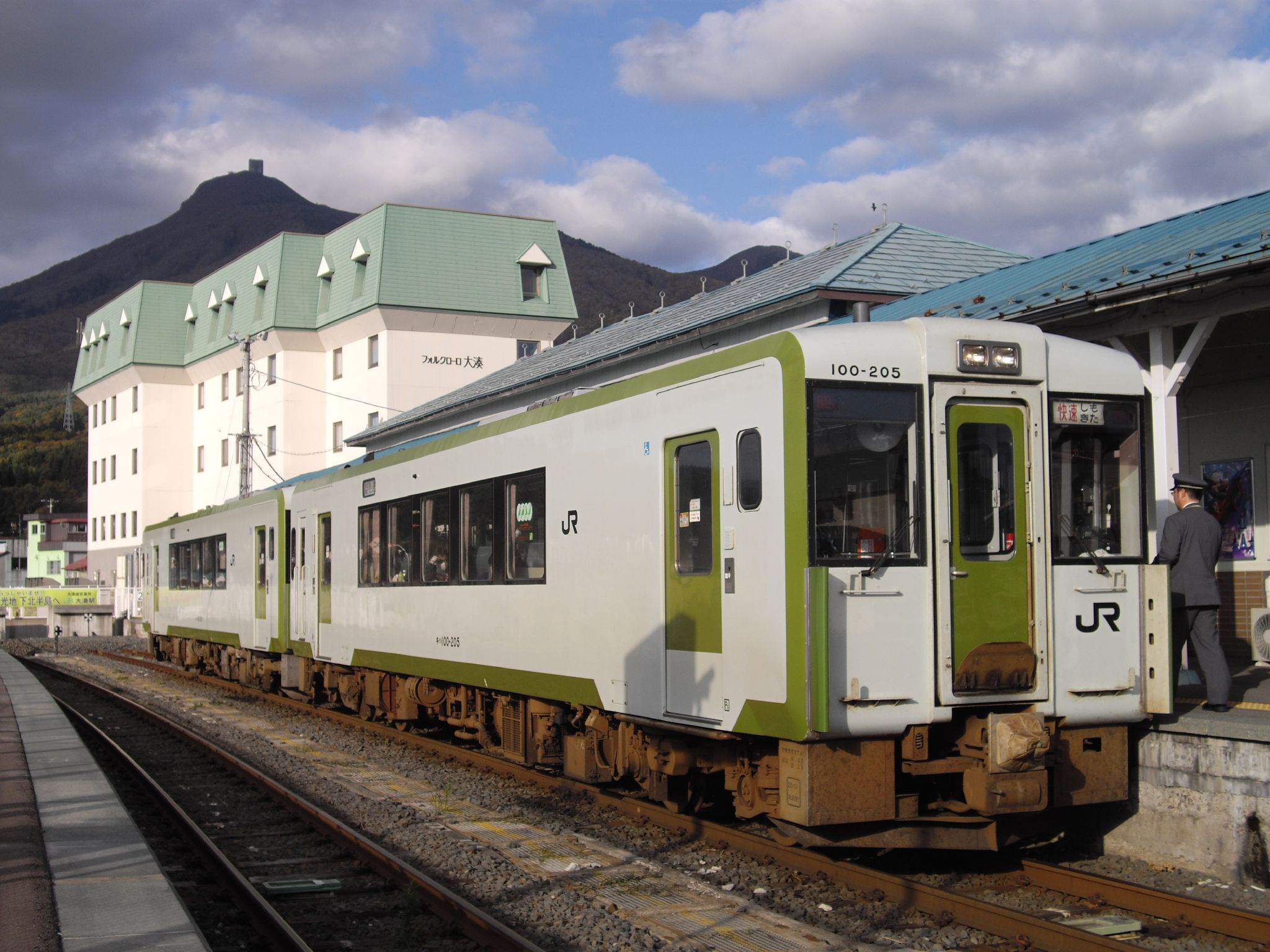
- A KiHa 100 series DMU at Ominato Station on a Shimokita rapid service in October 2009

Overview
- Native name: 大湊線
- Status: In operation
- Owner: East Japan Railway Company
- Locale: Aomori Prefecture
- Termini: Noheji; Ōminato
- Stations: 11

Service
- Type: Heavy rail
- Operator: East Japan Railway Company
- Rolling stock: KiHa 100 series DMU

History
- Opened: 1921

Technical
- Line length: 58.4 km (36.3 mi)
- Number of tracks: Entire line single tracked
- Character: Rural
- Track gauge: 3 ft 6 in (1,067 mm)
- Electrification: None
- Operating speed: 85 km/h (53 mph)
Route map

The Ōminato Line (Japanese: 大湊線, Hepburn: Ōminato-sen) is a railway line operated by East Japan Railway Company (JR East). It connects Noheji Station and Ōminato Station on the Shimokita Peninsula in eastern Aomori Prefecture.

== Services ==
Some trains operate a through service to/from Hachinohe on the Aoimori Railway Line. In addition to local services, the Shimokita rapid service operates on the line.

As of January 2026, the following services operate every day:

- Local services: 7 trips Noheji—Ominato and 6 trips Ominato—Noheji (with 1 trip operating through to Hachinohe)
- Shimokita rapid service: 2 trips Hachinohe—Ominato, 2 trips Ominato—Hachinohe and 1 trip Ominato—Noheji

== Station list ==
Legend

●	All rapid service trains stop
▲	Some rapid service trains stop
|	Rapid service trains do not stop

Station	Distance in km (mi)		Shimokita	Transfers	Location
Station	Between stations	Total	Shimokita	Transfers	Location
↑ Some trains operate through-service to/from Hachinohe via the Aoimori Railway Line ↑
Noheji 野辺地	—N/a	0.0 (0)	●	Aoimori Railway Line	Noheji
Kita-Noheji 北野辺地	2.8 (1.7)	2.8 (1.7)	｜		Noheji
Arito 有戸	6.3 (3.9)	9.6 (6.0)	｜		Noheji
Fukkoshi 吹越	13.4 (8.3)	23.0 (14.3)	｜		Yokohama
Mutsu-Yokohama 陸奥横浜	7.1 (4.4)	30.1 (18.7)	●		Yokohama
Arihata 有畑	5.9 (3.7)	36.0 (22.4)	｜		Yokohama
Chikagawa 近川	6.7 (4.2)	42.7 (26.5)	▲		Mutsu
Kanayasawa 金谷沢	5.0 (3.1)	47.7 (29.6)	｜		Mutsu
Akagawa 赤川	5.5 (3.4)	53.2 (33.1)	｜		Mutsu
Shimokita 下北	2.3 (1.4)	55.4 (34.4)	●		Mutsu
Ōminato 大湊	2.9 (1.8)	58.4 (36.3)	●		Mutsu

== Rolling stock ==
- KiHa 100 series 2-car diesel multiple unit (DMU) (Local services and Shimokita rapid services use the same cars)

== History ==
On March 20, 1921, the Ōminato Light Railway (大湊軽便線, Ōminato-keibensen) began operations between Noheji Station and Mutsu-Yokohama Station. The line was extended to its present terminus of Ōminato Station by September 25, 1921. In 1922 the line was nationalised, and renamed the Ōminato Line of the Japanese Government Railway (JGR, later JNR).

Express Natsudomari operations began from Aomori Station on a seasonal basis in 1968. The express was later downgraded to rapid service and renamed the Usori, and later the Shimokita. All freight operations ceased on February 1, 1984. With the dissolution and privatization of the JNR on April 1, 1984, the line came under the control of the East Japan Railway Company. On December 4, 1999, a new centralized traffic control (CTC) system became operational. In 2002, seasonal excursion train Kirakira Michinoku operations commenced and a limited number of Shimokita trains were extended to terminate at Hachinohe Station instead of Noheji. The Shimokita service operates a daily round trip to Aomori and 3 round trips to Hachinohe in conjunction with the Aoimori Railway.

The Tōhoku Main Line, including Noheji was transferred from JR East to Aoimori Railway on December 4, 2010, following the extension of the Tohoku Shinkansen from Hachinohe to Shin-Aomori. This resulted in the isolation of the Ōminato Line, a branch of the Tōhoku Main Line, from the rest of the JR East network with the exception of the Shimokita service from Aomori where it connects with the Ōu Main Line and Tsugaru Line.

At an unknown date, the number and destinations of Shimokita trains was changed. The round trip to Aomori ceased operating, and as of January 2026 the following daily services operate: 2 trips Hachinohe—Ominato, 2 trips Ominato—Hachinohe and 1 trip Ominato—Noheji.

=== Former connecting lines ===
- Akagawa station - The Aomori Prefectural Government operated a 4 km (2.5 mi) 762 mm (2 ft 6 in) gauge line to Tanabu-Yanagicho between 1921 and 1941.
- Shimokita station - The 18 km Ōhata Line opened in 1939, and construction continued toward Ōma to service a proposed naval base to protect the Tsugaru Strait, and was well advanced when work was suspended in 1943 due to a shortage of materials. The Seikan Tunnel was originally proposed to utilise the roadbed of the uncompleted Ōma Line (as well as that of the uncompleted Toi Line near Hakodate) but in 1968 the route was changed to the alignment subsequently built. Freight services ceased on the Ōhata Line in 1979, and operation of it was transferred to Shimokita Koutsu in 1985. The line closed in 2001.
