= Shimokita Station =

Railway station in Mutsu, Aomori Prefecture, Japan

Shimokita Station 下北駅
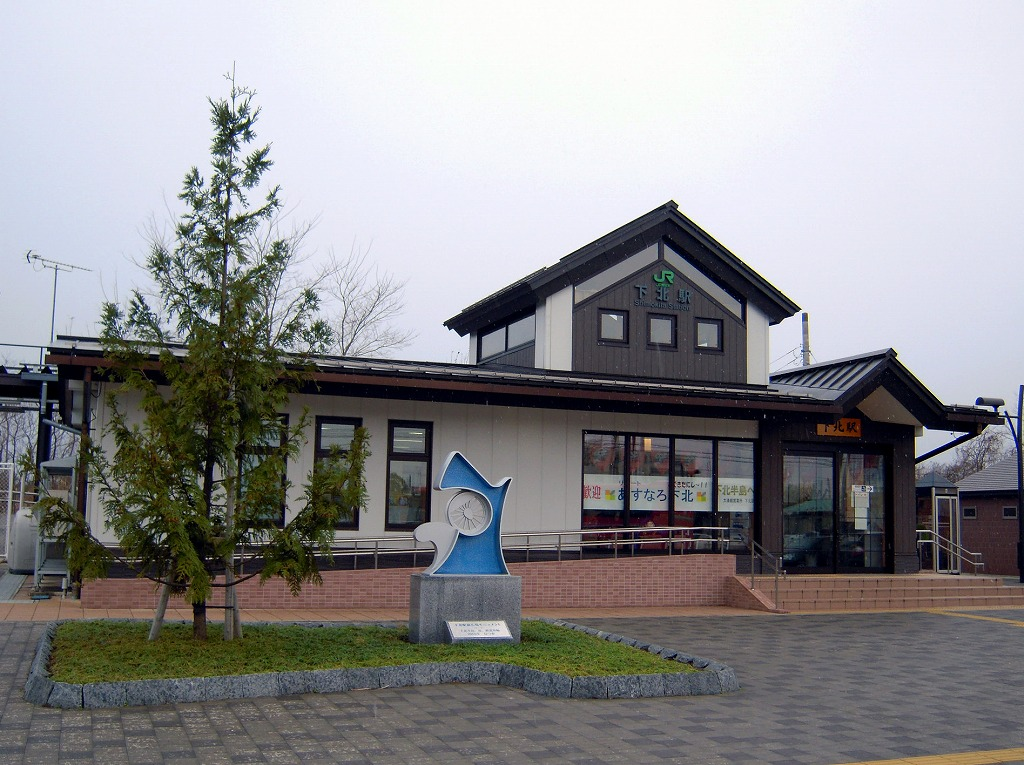
- Shimokita Station in December 2010

General information
- Location: 4-13 Shimokita, Mutsu-shi, Aomori-ken 035-0061; Japan
- Coordinates: 41°16′59.55″N 141°11′23.50″E
- Operator: JR East
- Line: ■ Ōminato Line
- Distance: 55.5 km from Noheji
- Platforms: 1 island platform
- Tracks: 1
- Connections: Bus stop

Construction
- Structure type: At grade

Other information
- Status: Staffed (Midori no Madoguchi)
- Website: Official website

History
- Opened: December 6, 1939
- Rebuilt: 2009

Passengers
- FY20188: 193 daily

Services
Preceding station	JR East	Following station
Chikagawa (limited service) towards Noheji	Shimokita	Ōminato Terminus
Akagawa towards Noheji	Ōminato Line	Ōminato Terminus
Location
- Location within Aomori Prefecture Location within Japan

Shimokita Station (下北駅, Shimokita-eki) is a railway station in the city of Mutsu, Aomori Prefecture, Japan, operated by East Japan Railway Company (JR East). It was formerly the terminal station for the Shimokita Kōtsu Company's Ōhata Line, which closed in 2001 and was replaced by a bus line.

== Lines ==
Shimokita Station is served by the Ōminato Line, and is located 55.5 kilometers from the terminus of the Ōminato Line at Noheji Station.

== Station layout ==
The station has one ground-level island platform, of which only one side is in use, serving bidirectional traffic. The other side of the platform was formerly used for the now-defunct Ōhata Line. The station building is attended, and has a Midori no Madoguchi staffed ticket office as well as an automatic ticket machine.

=== Platforms ===
Station side	■ Ōminato Line	for Ōminato for Noheji and Aomori
Opposite side	■ Ōminato Line	<siding>

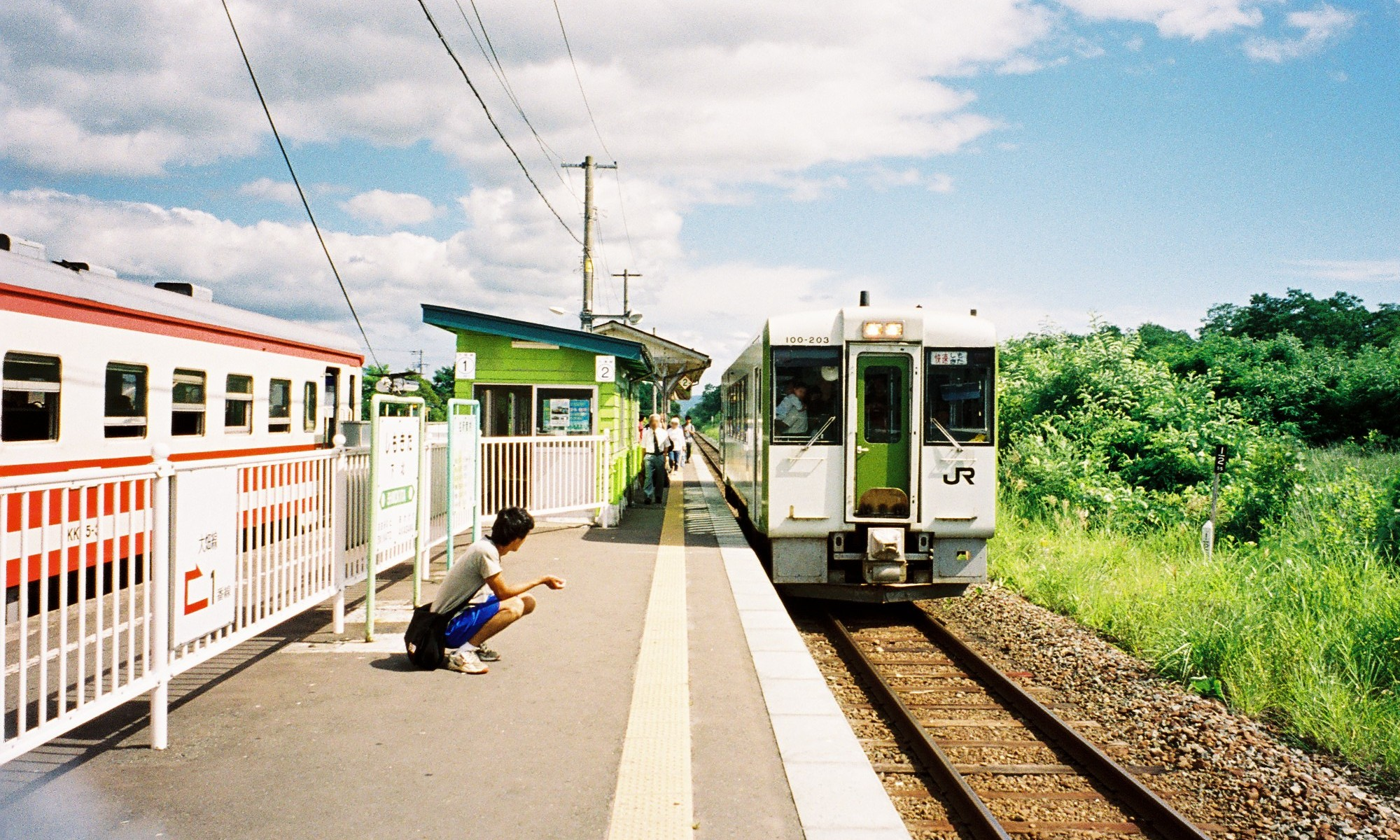
Ōhata Line platform（August 2000）

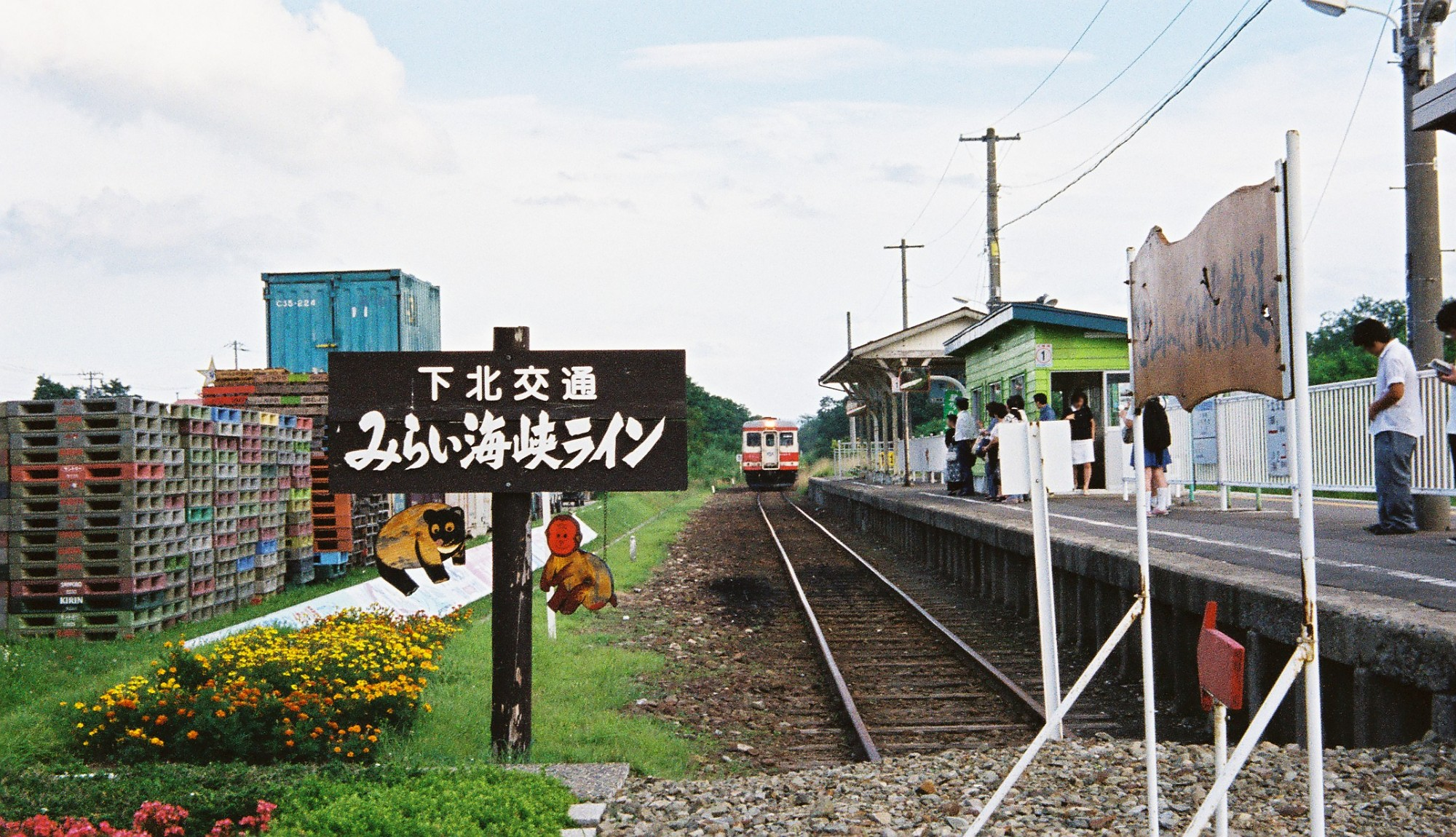
Ōhata Line platform（August 2000）

== History ==
Shimokita Station opened on December 6, 1939 as a station on the Japanese Government Railways (JGR). With the privatization of Japanese National Railways (JNR) on April 1, 1987, it came under the operational control of JR East. The station building was completely rebuilt in 2009.

== Passenger statistics ==
In fiscal 2018, the station was used by an average of 193 passengers daily (boarding passengers only).

== Surrounding area ==
- Mutsu City Hall
- Mutsu City Library
- Mutsu Post Office
- Mutsu General Hospital

== See also ==
- List of railway stations in Japan
