= Yokohama, Aomori =

Yokohama 横浜町
- Town
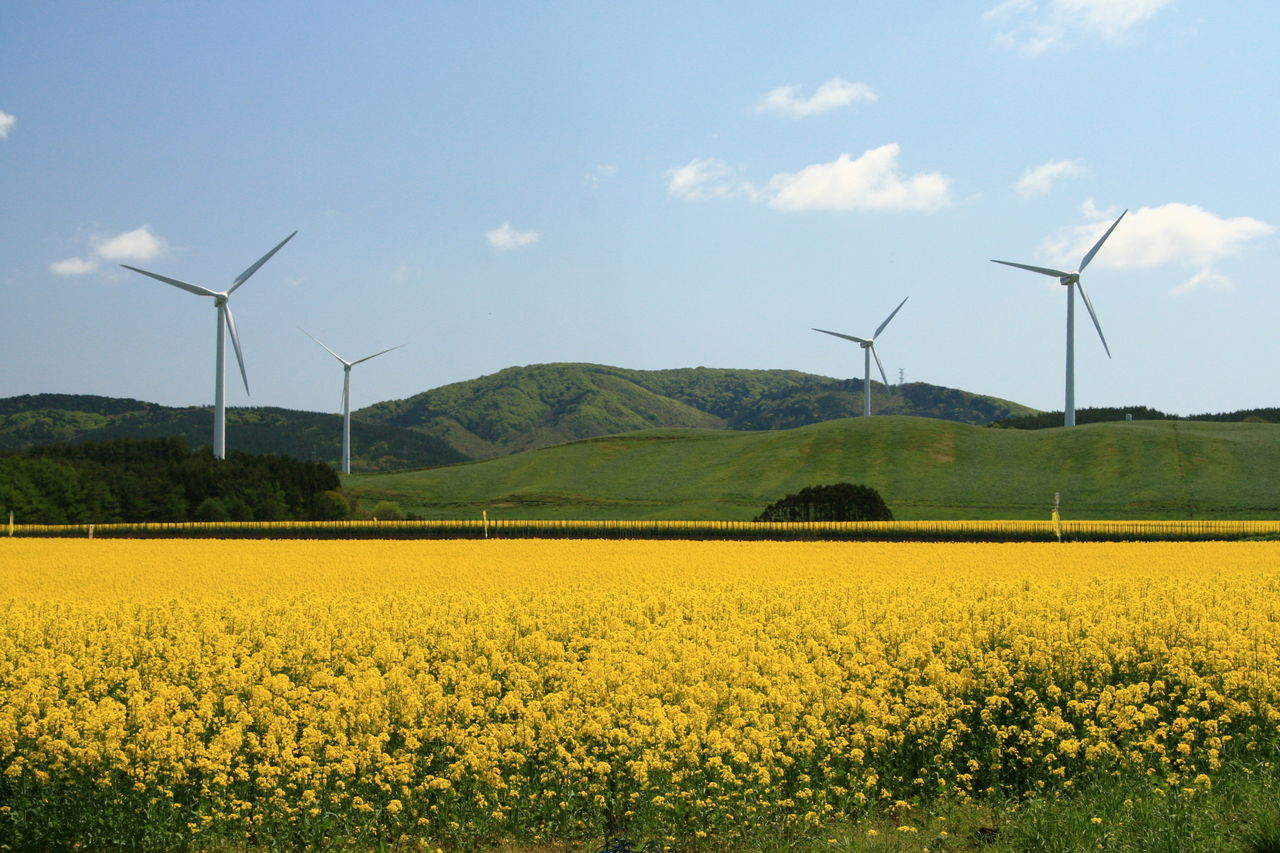
- Windpower farm in Yokohama

- Flag Seal
- Location of Yokohama in Aomori Prefecture

- Coordinates: 41°04′59″N 141°14′52″E
- Country: Japan
- Region: Tōhoku
- Prefecture: Aomori Prefecture
- District: Kamikita

Area
  - Total: 126.38 km^{2} (48.80 sq mi)

Population (January 1, 2026)
  - Total: 3,937
  - Density: 31.15/km^{2} (80.68/sq mi)
- Time zone: UTC+9 (Japan Standard Time)
- Phone number: 0175-78-2111
- Address: Teranoshita 35, Yokohama-machi, Kitakami-gun, Aomori-ken 039-4145
- Website: Official website
- Symbols
- Bird: Plover
- Fish: Sea cucumber
- Flower: Rapeseed
- Tree: Keyaki

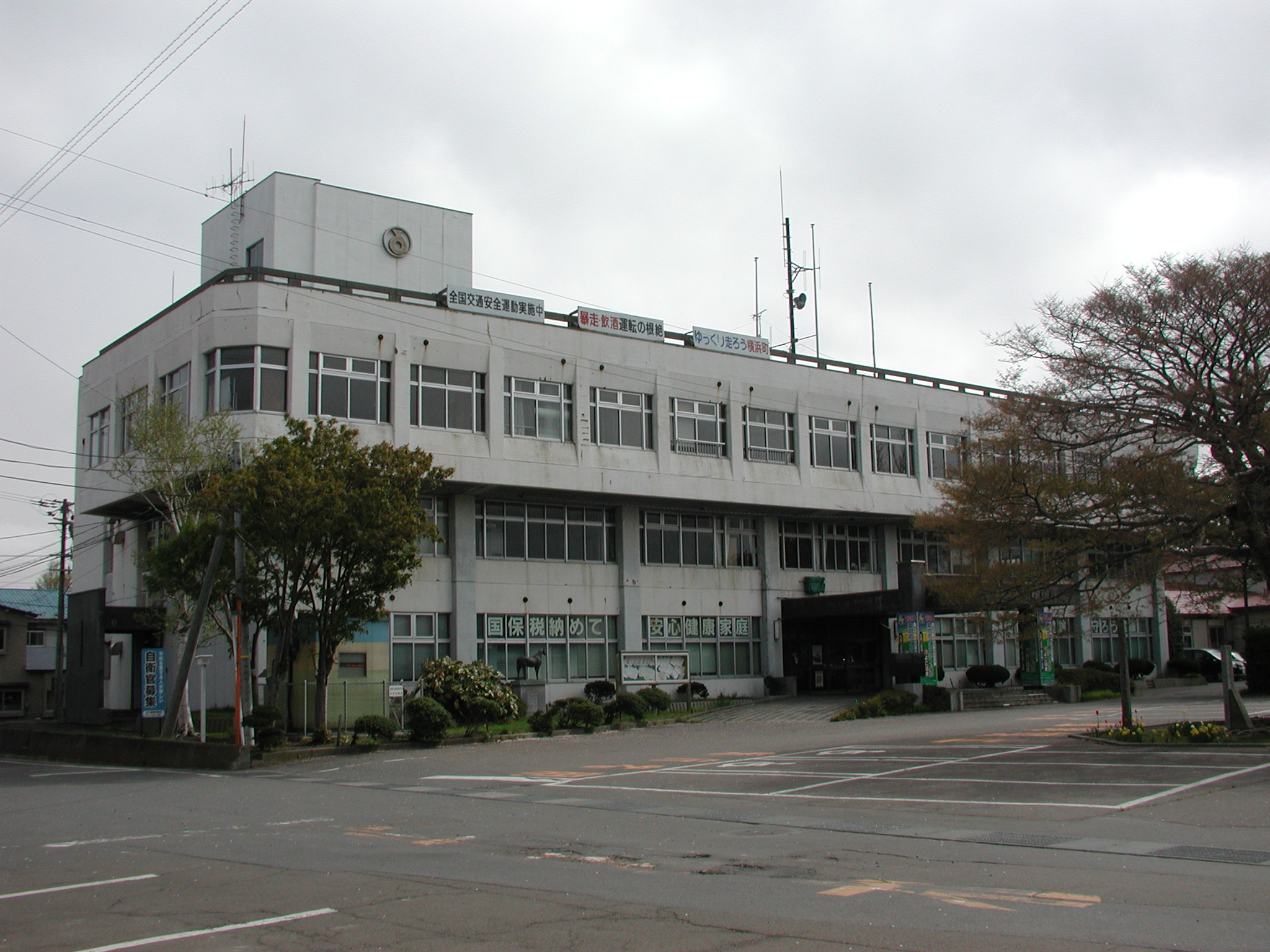
Yokohama Town Hall

Yokohama (横浜町, Yokohama-machi) is a town located in Aomori Prefecture, Japan. As of 1 January 2026, the town had an estimated population of 3,937 in 2113 households, and a population density of 31 persons per km^{2}. The total area of the town is 126.38 square kilometres (48.80 sq mi).

== Geography ==
Yokohama occupies the northeastern coastline of Mutsu Bay, at the entrance to Shimokita Peninsula.

=== Neighbouring municipalities ===
Aomori Prefecture

- Mutsu
- Higashidōri
- Noheji
- Rokkasho

=== Climate ===
The town has a cold maritime climate characterized by cool short summers and long cold winters with heavy snowfall (Köppen climate classification Cfb). The average annual temperature in Yokohama is 9.1 °C. The average annual rainfall is 1262 mm with September as the wettest month. The temperatures are highest on average in August, at around 21.9 °C, and lowest in January, at around -2.6 °C.

== Demographics ==
Per Japanese census data, the population of Yokohama has declined over the past 60 years.

Historical population

Year	Pop.	±%
1920	3,316	—
1930	4,173	+25.8%
1940	5,016	+20.2%
1950	7,068	+40.9%
1960	7,742	+9.5%
1970	7,144	−7.7%

Year	Pop.	±%
1980	6,590	−7.8%
1990	6,126	−7.0%
2000	5,508	−10.1%
2010	4,881	−11.4%
2020	4,229	−13.4%

== History ==
Finds of Jōmon pottery indicate that the area of Yokohama was inhabited for many thousands of years. The place name of "Yokohama" predates its more famous namesake in Kanagawa Prefecture, and can be found in Nanboku-chō period documents. The area around Yokohama was controlled by the Nambu clan from the Kamakura period and was the site of several small fortifications in the Sengoku period. In the Edo Period, it was part of Morioka Domain and prospered through trade with the Kansai region, exporting particularly hinoki cypress and sea cucumber in exchange for cloth. However, much of the timber had been logged out by the mid-18th century. Yokohama was also a post town on the Tanabe kaidō, a highway to the north shore of the Shimokita Peninsula from where travelers could take a boat to Ezo (Hokkaido). Following the Boshin War, it was part of the territory of the briefly-established Tonami Domain, where ex-samurai from former Aizu Domain were resettled. During the post-Meiji restoration establishment of the modern municipalities system on 1 April 1889, Yokohama was proclaimed to be a village. In 1891, the Tohoku Main Line was opened, and passengers heading to Ezo could travel via Aomori on the line, and the importance of towns along the Tanabe kaidō, including Yokohama, declined sharply. Yokohama was elevated to town status on April 1, 1958.

== Government ==
Yokohama has a mayor-council form of government with a directly elected mayor and a unicameral town council of ten members. Yokohama is part of Shimokita District which, together with the city of Mutsu, contributes three members to the Aomori Prefectural Assembly. In terms of national politics, the town is part of Aomori 2nd district of the lower house of the Diet of Japan.

== Economy ==
The economy of Yokohama was traditionally heavily dependent on commercial fishing in Mutsu Bay, primarily for sea cucumber, the local specialty, as well as sea urchin roe and scallops. With regards to agriculture, rapeseed and potato farming predominates. Electrical power production via wind farms also contributes to the local economy.

== Education ==
Yokohama has one public elementary school and one public middle school operated by the town government. The town does not have a high school.

== Transportation ==
=== Railway ===
East Japan Railway Company (JR East) - Ōminato Line

- Fukkoshi - Mutsu-Yokohama - Arihata

=== Highway ===
- Shimokita Expressway
- National Route 279
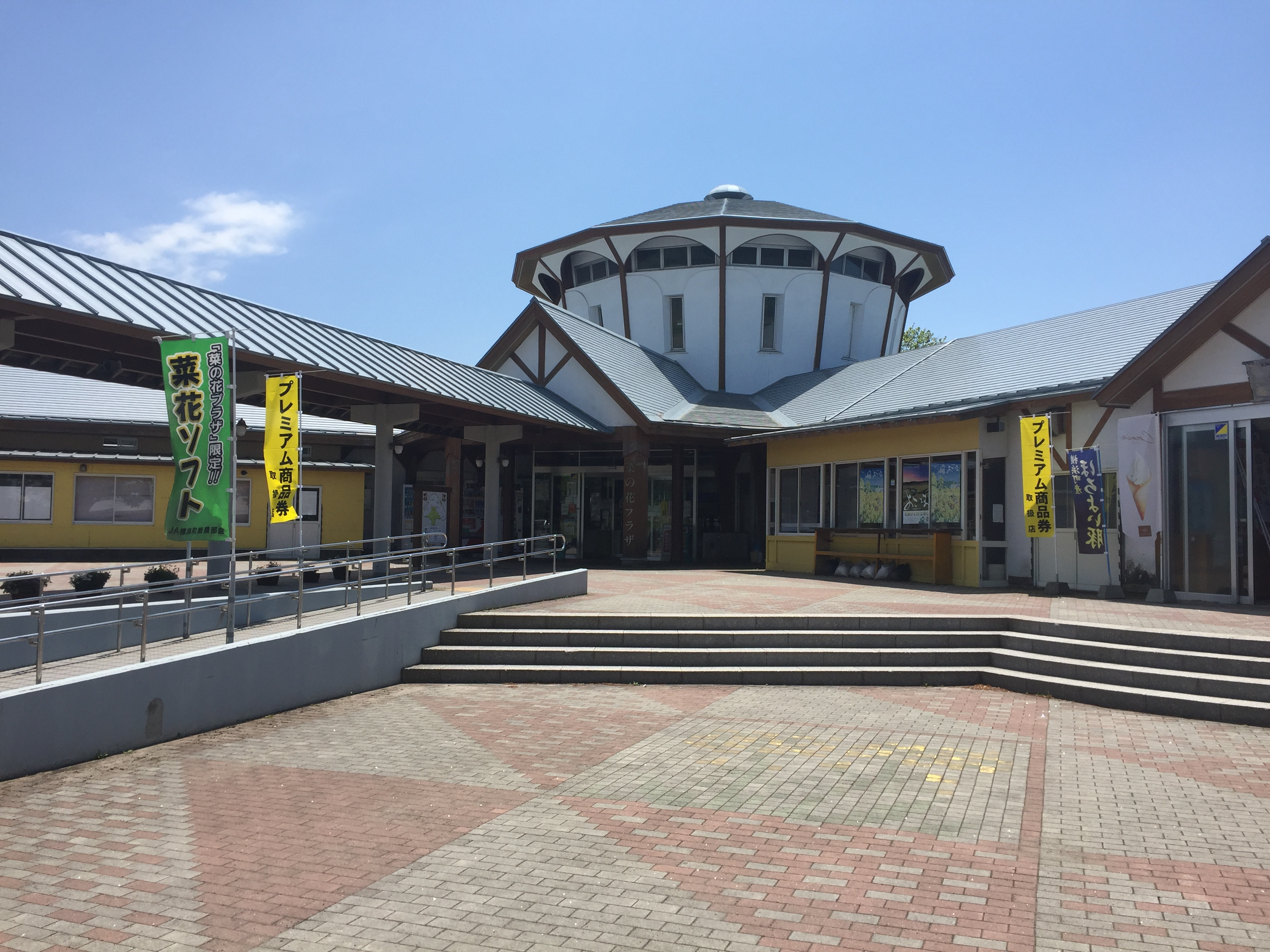
Yokohama road station

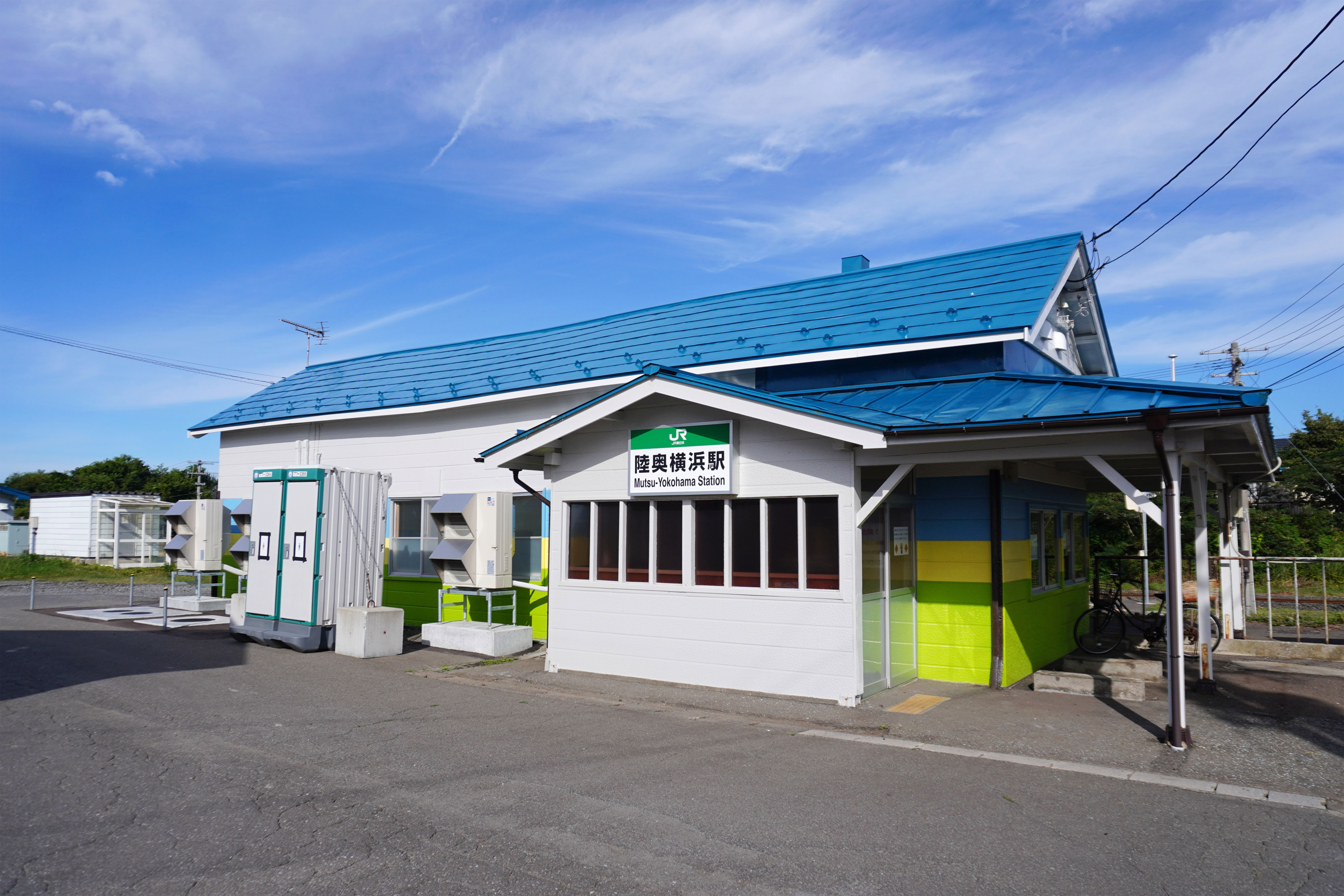
Mutsu-Yokohama train station

== Noted people from Yokohama ==
- Hiroko Nakano, politician
