= Noheji =

Noheji 野辺地
- Town
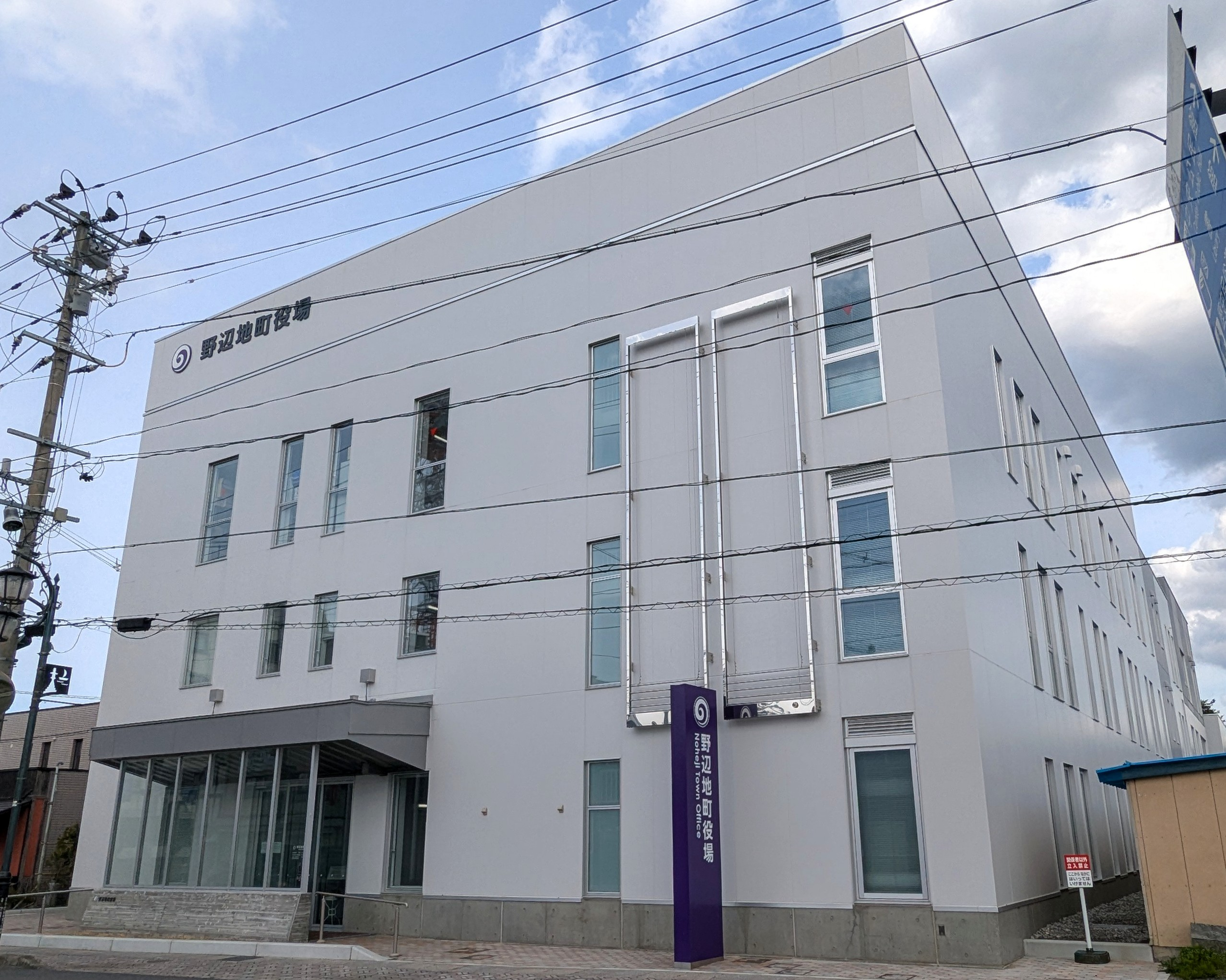
- Noheji Town Hall

- Flag Seal
- Location of Noheji in Aomori Prefecture

- Coordinates: 40°51′52″N 141°07′44″E
- Country: Japan
- Region: Tōhoku
- Prefecture: Aomori
- District: Kamikita

Area
  - Total: 81.68 km^{2} (31.54 sq mi)

Population (January 1, 2026)
  - Total: 11,539
  - Density: 141.3/km^{2} (365.9/sq mi)
- Time zone: UTC+9 (Japan Standard Time)
- Phone number: 0175-64-2111
- Address: Noheiji 123-1, Kitakami-gun, Aomori-ken 039-3131
- Climate: Cfa
- Website: Official website
- Symbols
- Bird: Common gull
- Flower: Rosa rugosa
- Tree: Sakura

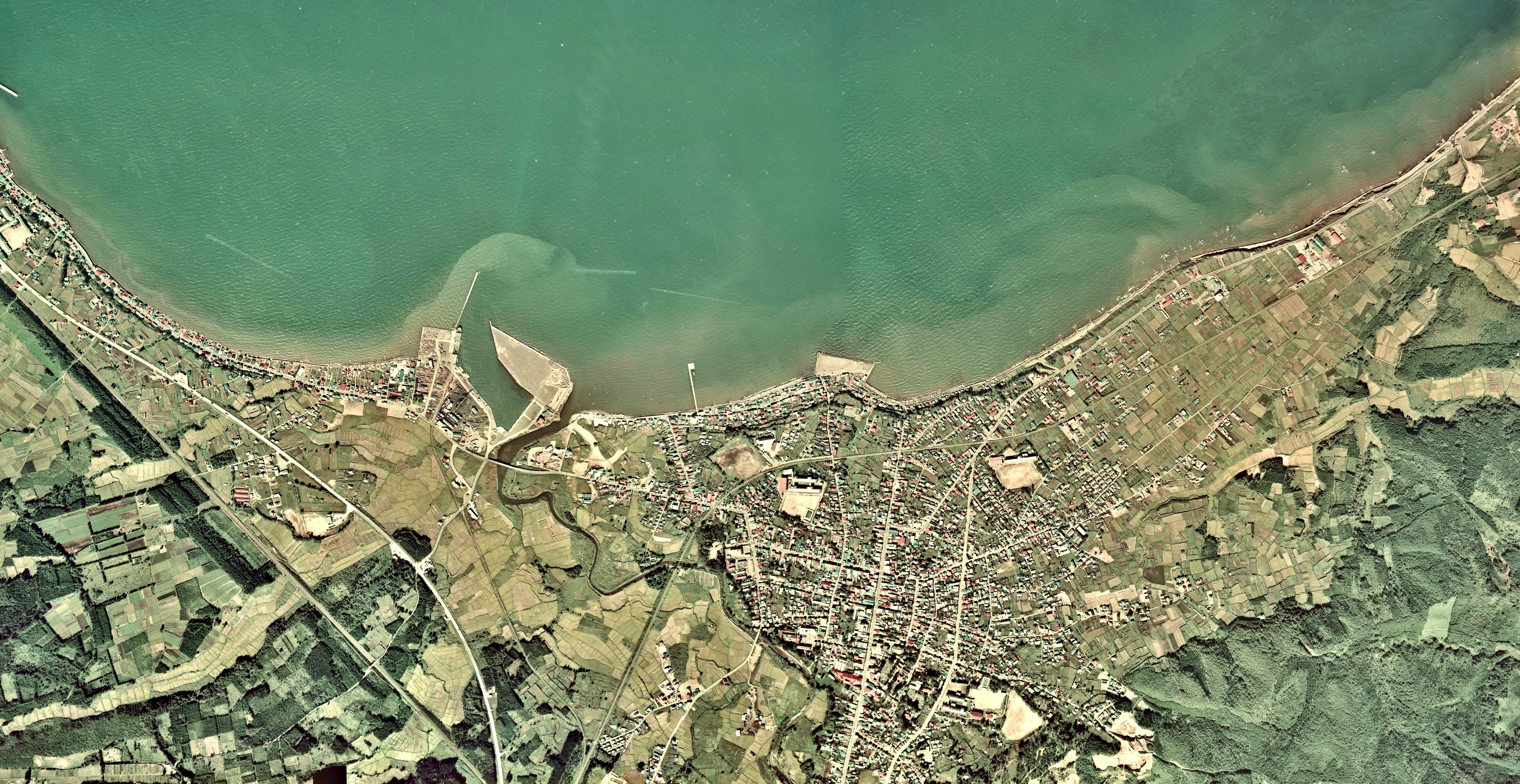
Noheji town center area Aerial photograph, 1975

Noheji (野辺地町, Noheji-machi) is a town located in Aomori Prefecture, Japan. As of 1 January 2026, the town had an estimated population of 11,539 in 6228 households, and a population density of 141 persons per km^{2}. The total area of the town is 81.68 square kilometers (31.54 sq mi).

== Geography ==
Noheji occupies the southeastern coastline of Mutsu Bay at the base of the Shimokita Peninsula.

=== Neighboring municipalities ===
Aomori Prefecture

- Hiranai
- Rokkasho
- Tōhoku
- Yokohama

=== Climate ===
The town has a cold maritime climate characterized by cool short summers and long cold winters with heavy snowfall (Köppen climate classification Cfa). The average annual temperature in Noheji is 10.1 °C. The average annual rainfall is 1243 mm with September as the wettest month. The temperatures are highest on average in August, at around 22.7 °C, and lowest in January, at around -2.1 °C.

Climate data for Noheji (2008−2020 normals, extremes 2008−present)
Month	Jan	Feb	Mar	Apr	May	Jun	Jul	Aug	Sep	Oct	Nov	Dec	Year
Record high °C (°F)	12.2 (54.0)	17.2 (63.0)	20.7 (69.3)	26.5 (79.7)	28.4 (83.1)	32.2 (90.0)	33.0 (91.4)	35.6 (96.1)	32.6 (90.7)	28.5 (83.3)	21.9 (71.4)	18.0 (64.4)	35.6 (96.1)
Mean daily maximum °C (°F)	1.6 (34.9)	2.3 (36.1)	6.2 (43.2)	11.9 (53.4)	17.1 (62.8)	20.4 (68.7)	24.2 (75.6)	25.8 (78.4)	23.0 (73.4)	17.2 (63.0)	10.8 (51.4)	4.4 (39.9)	13.7 (56.7)
Daily mean °C (°F)	−0.7 (30.7)	−0.5 (31.1)	2.6 (36.7)	7.3 (45.1)	12.4 (54.3)	16.0 (60.8)	20.4 (68.7)	22.1 (71.8)	19.1 (66.4)	13.2 (55.8)	7.3 (45.1)	1.6 (34.9)	10.1 (50.1)
Mean daily minimum °C (°F)	−3.5 (25.7)	−3.5 (25.7)	−1.2 (29.8)	2.5 (36.5)	8.2 (46.8)	12.5 (54.5)	17.5 (63.5)	19.1 (66.4)	15.2 (59.4)	8.7 (47.7)	3.5 (38.3)	−1.4 (29.5)	6.5 (43.7)
Record low °C (°F)	−12.3 (9.9)	−11.1 (12.0)	−10.7 (12.7)	−4.7 (23.5)	−1.0 (30.2)	4.9 (40.8)	11.8 (53.2)	12.6 (54.7)	5.7 (42.3)	0.9 (33.6)	−4.3 (24.3)	−8.1 (17.4)	−12.3 (9.9)
Average precipitation mm (inches)	81.5 (3.21)	66.4 (2.61)	84.2 (3.31)	75.5 (2.97)	82.4 (3.24)	89.5 (3.52)	137.0 (5.39)	196.8 (7.75)	148.0 (5.83)	132.5 (5.22)	85.0 (3.35)	109.8 (4.32)	1,291.1 (50.83)
Average snowfall cm (inches)	116 (46)	99 (39)	51 (20)	4 (1.6)	0 (0)	0 (0)	0 (0)	0 (0)	0 (0)	0 (0)	8 (3.1)	97 (38)	375 (147.7)
Average precipitation days (≥ 1.0 mm)	17.0	14.4	12.5	9.9	9.8	8.7	10.7	10.9	11.1	12.3	14.3	18.2	149.8
Average snowy days (≥ 3 cm)	13.6	11.2	5.9	0.6	0	0	0	0	0	0	1.0	10.1	42.4
Mean monthly sunshine hours	74.3	94.8	153.3	192.7	210.0	166.1	136.4	148.5	160.7	150.3	96.0	70.1	1,651.6
Source: Japan Meteorological Agency

== Demographics ==
Per Japanese census data, the population of Noheji peaked in around the year 1970 and has declined over the past 50 years.

Historical population
Year	Pop.	±%
1920	10,240	—
1930	11,735	+14.6%
1940	12,975	+10.6%
1950	16,521	+27.3%
1960	17,447	+5.6%
1970	17,544	+0.6%
1980	18,419	+5.0%
1990	16,750	−9.1%
2000	16,012	−4.4%
2010	14,314	−10.6%
2020	12,374	−13.6%

== History ==
The area around Noheji was inhabited by the Emishi people until the historical period, and the name "Noheji" is derived from "Nosobechi", or "place where a pure river flows through a field" in the Ainu language. During the Edo period, the area was controlled by the Nanbu clan of Morioka Domain and prospered due to its fishing industry and location on the road connecting Morioka Domain with the Hirosaki Domain. During the Boshin War of the Meiji Restoration, the Battle of Noheji occurred between the Tokugawa loyalist forces of Morioka Domain and pro-imperial forces of Hirosaki Domain on 11 November 1868, resulting in a victory for the Imperial faction. During the post-Meiji restoration creation of the modern municipalities system on 1 April 1889, the village of Noheiji was established. Noheji was elevated to town status on 28 August 1898.

== Government ==
Noheji has a mayor-council form of government with a directly elected mayor and a unicameral town council of 12 members. Noheji is part of Shimokita District which contributes four members to the Aomori Prefectural Assembly. In terms of national politics, the town is part of Aomori 2nd district of the lower house of the Diet of Japan.

== Economy ==
The economy of Noheji is heavily dependent on commercial fishing, especially for scallops, and on agriculture with the raising of mountain yams predominating. The town also serves as a commercial and transportation center for the surrounding rural areas.

== Education ==
Noheji has three public elementary schools and one public middle school operated by the town government, and one public high school operated by the Aomori Prefectural Board of Education. The town also has one private high school.

== Transportation ==
=== Railway ===
Aoimori Railway Company - Aoimori Railway Line

- Noheji

East Japan Railway Company (JR East) - Ōminato Line

- Noheji - Kita-Noheji - Arito

=== Highway ===
- Shimokita Expressway
- National Route 4
- National Route 45 (unsigned)
- National Route 279

== Local attractions ==
- Makado Onsen, a hot spring and ski resort
- Noheiji Battle Memorial
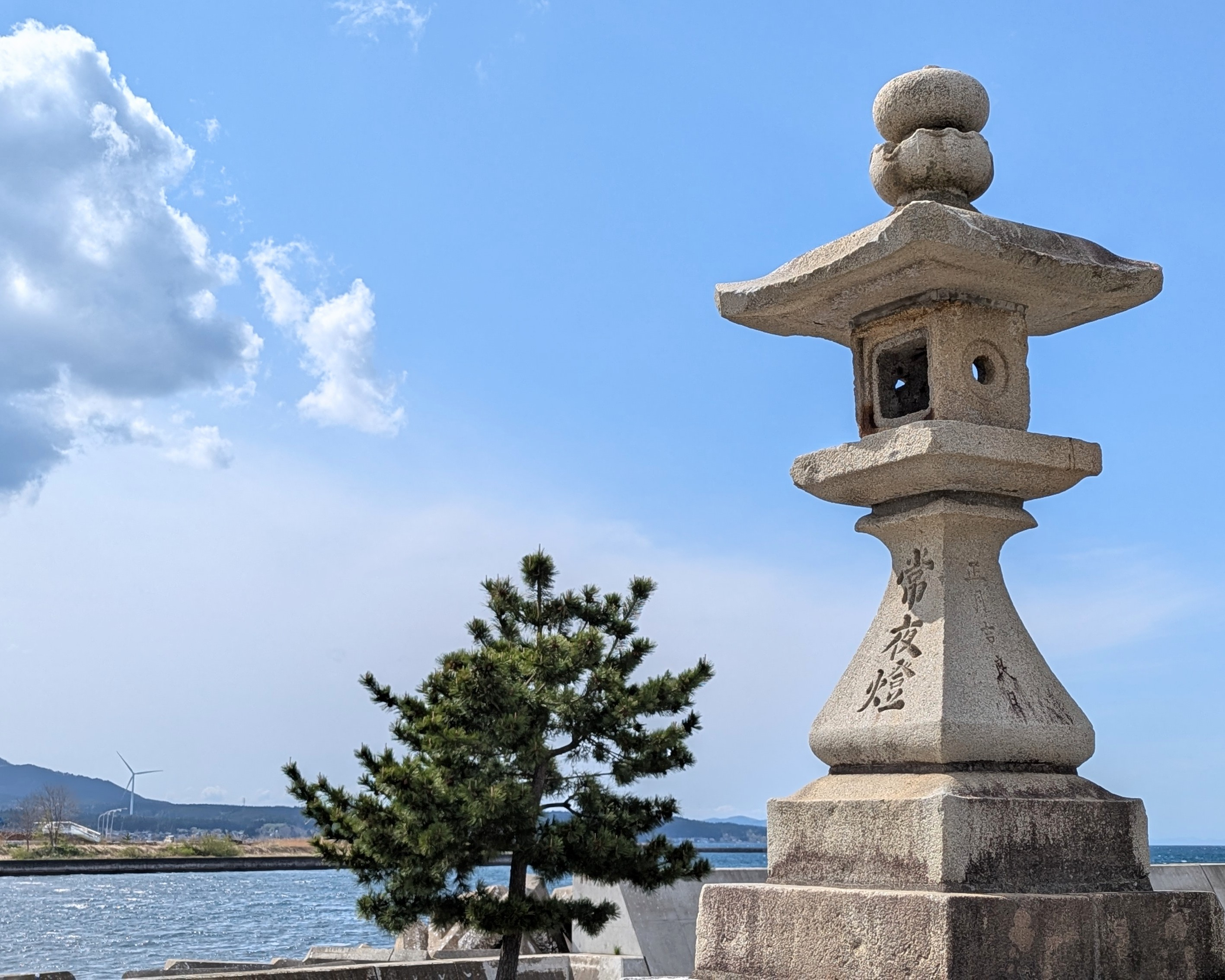
Joyato Park

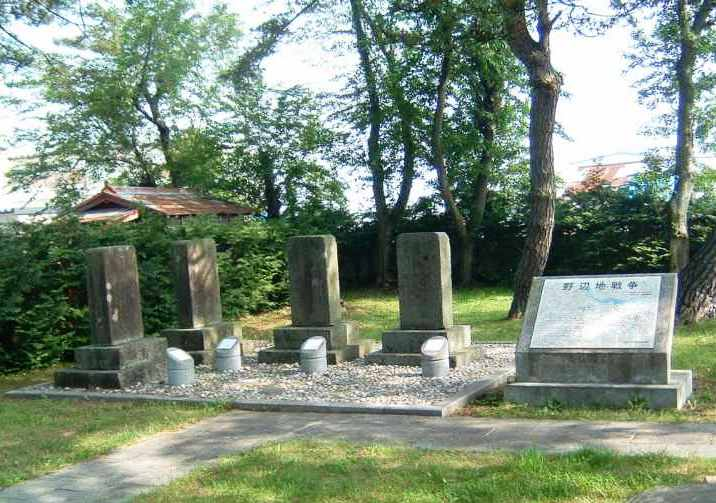
Noheiji Battle Memorial

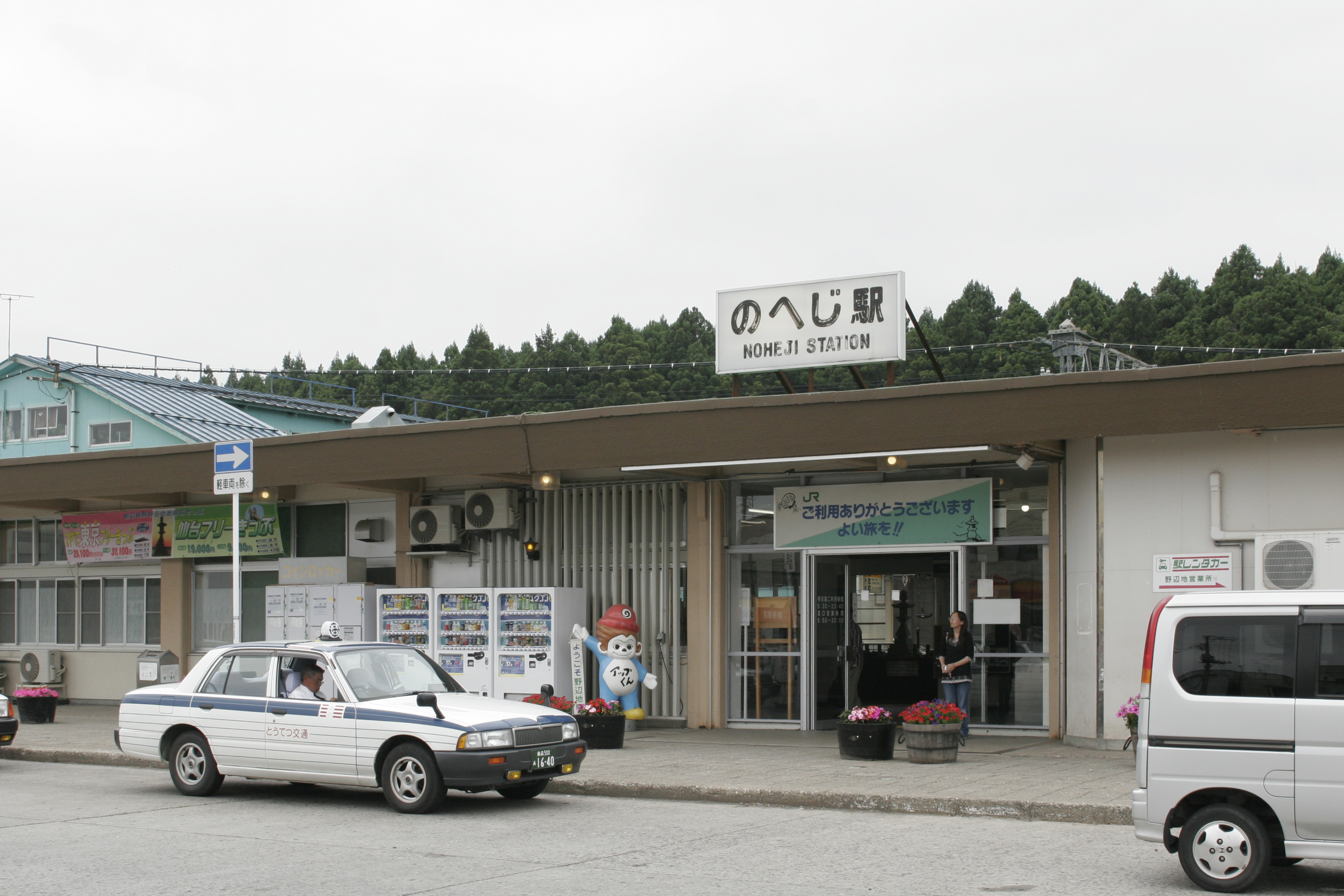
Noheji Station

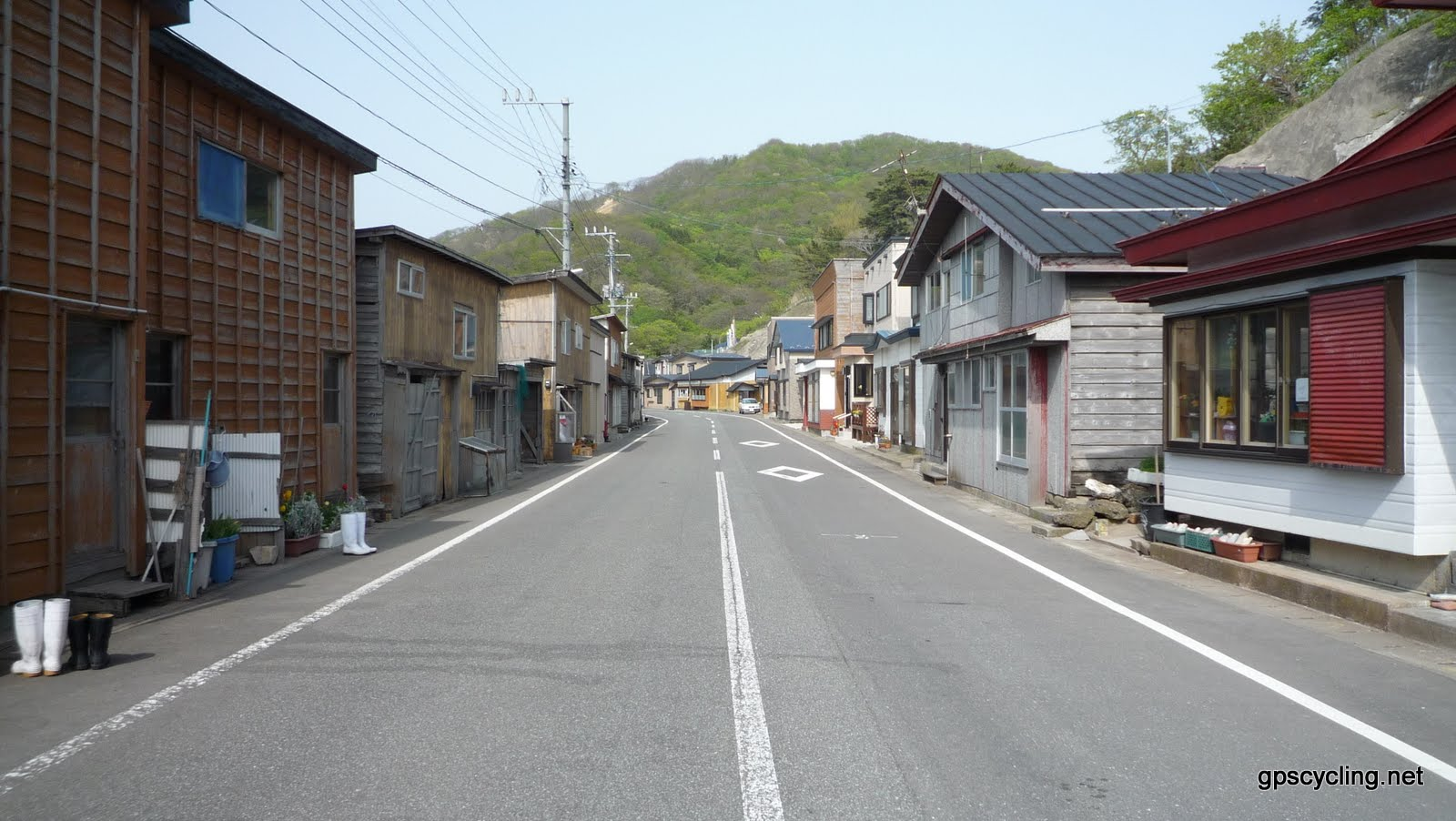
Isoya neighbourhood of Sai

== Noted people from Noheji ==
- Takaya Eguchi, modern dancer
- Tsuyoshi Ichinohe, skier
- Gaku Shibasaki, footballer
