= Noheji Station =

Railway station in Noheji, Aomori Prefecture, Japan

Noheji Station 野辺地駅
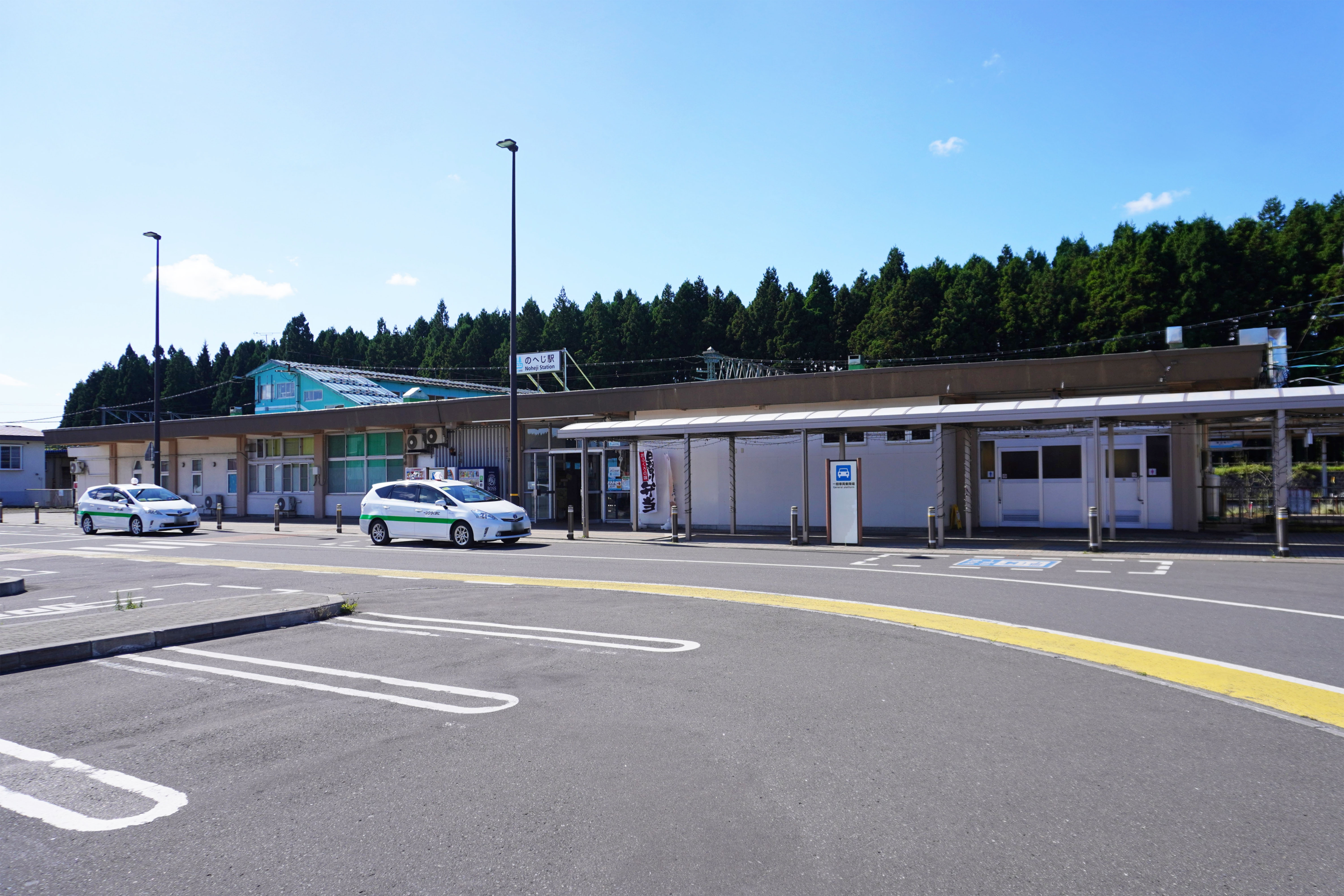
- Noheji Station in September 2023

General information
- Location: 49-2 Kamikonakano, Noheji-cho, Kamikita-gun, Aomori-ken 039-3154; Japan
- Coordinates: 40°51′18.54″N 141°07′10.60″E
- System: Regional rail station
- Operator: JR East; Aoimori Railway
- Lines: ■ Ōminato Line; ■ Aoimori Railway Line
- Distance: 44.6 km from Aomori
- Platforms: 1 side + 2 island platforms
- Connections: Bus stop

Construction
- Structure type: At grade

Other information
- Status: Staffed
- Website: Official website

History
- Opened: 1 September 1891

Passengers
- 202 daily (JR FY2022); 1486 (Aoimori FY2019)

Services
Preceding station	JR East	Following station
through to Aoimori Railway	Shimokita	Mutsu-Yokohama towards Ōminato
Terminus	Ōminato Line	Kita-Noheji towards Ōminato
Preceding station	Aoimori Railway	Following station
Ottomo (limited service) towards Hachinohe	Shimokita	through to JR East
Chibiki towards Metoki	Aoimori Railway Line	Karibasawa towards Aomori
Location
- Location within Aomori Prefecture Location within Japan

Noheji Station (野辺地駅, Noheji-eki) is a railway station located in the central district of the town of Noheji in Aomori Prefecture, Japan. The station has been operating since 1891. Since 2010, the station has been jointly operated by the East Japan Railway Company (JR East) and the Aoimori Railway Company, a third sector, regional rail operator. The station is the southern terminus of JR East's Ōminato Line and was formerly the northern terminus of the Nanbu Jūkan Railway.

== Lines ==
Noheji Station is one of six principal stations served by the Aoimori Railway Line, and is 44.6 kilometers (27.7 mi) from the northern terminus of the line at Aomori Station. It is also the southern terminus of the 58.4 kilometer Ōminato Line.

== Station layout ==
Noheji Station has a single ground-level side platform and two ground-level island platforms serving five tracks, connected by a footbridge. The station building has a staffed ticket office, as well as an automatic ticket machine.

=== Platforms ===
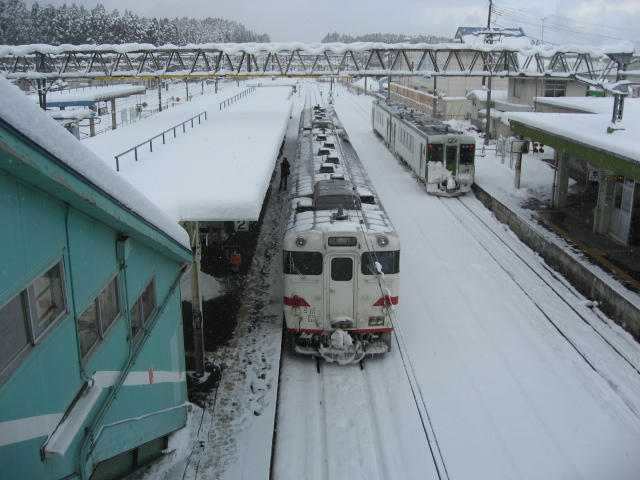
Noheji Station's platforms in January 2007

1	■ Ōminato Line	for Ōminato
2	■ Aoimori Railway Line	for Aomori for Hachinohe
2	■ Ōminato Line	for Ōminato
3	■ Aoimori Railway Line	for Misawa and Hachinohe for Aomori
4/5	■ Aoimori Railway Line	for Hachinohe for Aomori

== History ==
Noheiji Station was opened on 1 September 1891 as a station of the Nippon Railway. It was nationalized on 1 July 1906 and became a station of the Japanese Government Railways Tōhoku Main Line. On 20 March 1921, it became the southern terminus of the Ōminato Line. After the end of World War II, the JGR became the Japanese National Railways (JNR).

On 15 March 1954 an F-84 Thunderjet from nearby Misawa Air Base crashed on top of Noheji Station, destroying the station building and killing twelve people. The explosion left a crater three meters wide and two meters deep, and set fire to one of the carriages of the Tōhoku Main Line. Platforms 1 through 3 were also destroyed. The pilot ejected, but his parachute failed to open and he was also killed.

From 5 August 1968, the Nanbu Jūkan Railway began operations from Noheji (operations ended in 1997). With the privatization of JNR on 1 April 1987, it came under the operational control of JR East. The control of the Tōhoku Main Line (between Hachinohe and Aomori) was transferred to Aoimori Railway on 4 December 2010, the day the Tōhoku Shinkansen was extended to Shin-Aomori.

== Services ==
The station is primarily served by trains operating on Aomori–Hachinohe and Noheji–Ōminato local services. It is served by two rapid express trains, the Shimokita service operated jointly by JR East and the Aoimori Railway between Hachinohe and Ōminato stations, and the 560M train operated jointly by the Aoimori Railway and the Iwate Galaxy Railway between Aomori and Morioka. Passenger trains serve Noheji Station just under 17 hours a day from 6:24 am to 11:06 pm. At peak hours between the first train and 9:04 am trains depart from the station roughly every 30 minutes; otherwise trains depart at an approximate hourly basis.

=== Bus services ===
- Enburi; For Shinjuku Station and Tokyo Station

== Passenger statistics ==
In 2018, the station was used by a daily average of 294 passengers daily riding on the Ōminato Line. In the same year, the Aoimori Railway Line saw an average daily ridership of 2,068 passengers, making it the second busiest station along the line, excluding Aomori and Hachinohe stations. The total number of passengers utilizing the station between the two lines in 2018 was 2,362, an increase from the 2010 daily average of 673 passengers when the station was still fully operated by JR East.

In fiscal 2022, the JR portion of the station was used by an average of 202 passengers daily (boarding passengers only). The Aomori Railway portion of the station was used by 1486 passengers daily in 2019.

== Surrounding area ==
- Noheji Public Hospital
- Noheji Town Chamber of Commerce Women's Division Kitchen (former "Matsuura Shokudo"), a restaurant that opened almost at the same time as the opening of Noheji Station in 1891. In the 2000s, it offered a "cha-gayu set meal" by reservation, which was a reproduction of "cha-gayu," a dish considered to be part of Noheji Town's merchant culture.
- Aomori Prefectural Noheji High School
- National Route 279

== See also ==
- List of railway stations in Japan
