= Ōminato Station =

Railway station in Mutsu, Aomori Prefecture, Japan

Ōminato Station 大湊駅
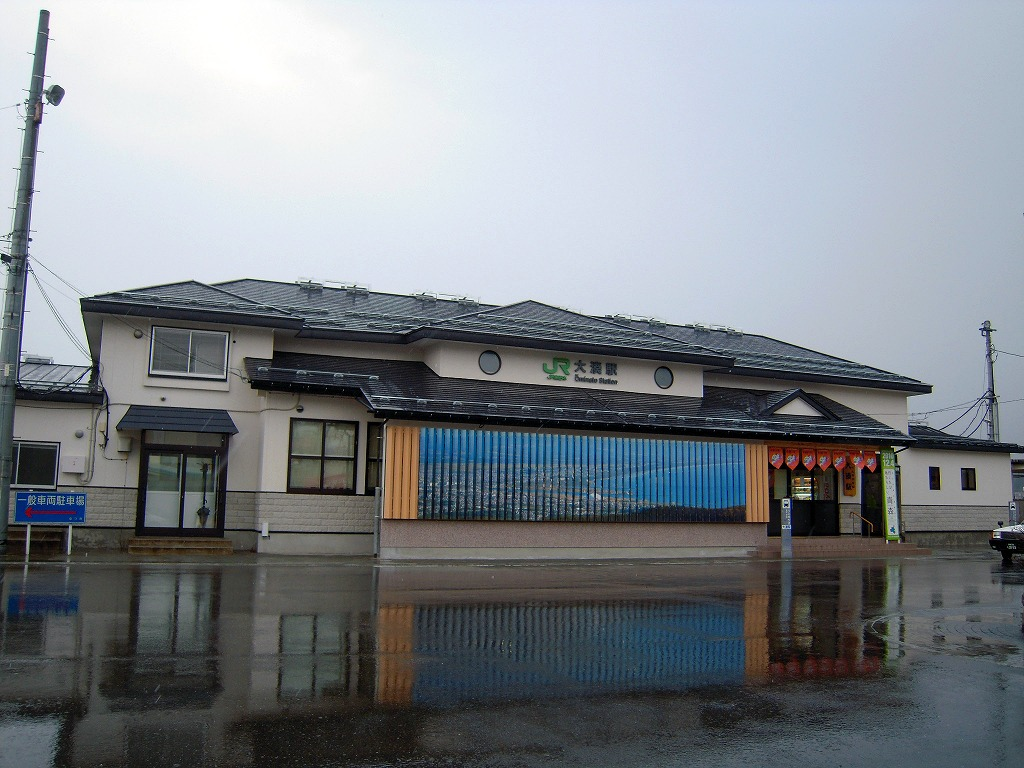
- Ōminato Station in December 2010

General information
- Location: 7-14 Ōminato-Shinmachi, Mutsu-shi, Aomori-ken 035-0084; Japan
- Coordinates: 41°16′49.85″N 141°09′41.23″E
- Operator: JR East
- Line: ■ Ōminato Line
- Distance: 58.4 km from Noheji
- Platforms: 2 side platforms
- Tracks: 2
- Connections: Bus stop

Construction
- Structure type: At grade

Other information
- Status: Staffed (Midori no Madoguchi)
- Website: Official website

History
- Opened: 25 September 1921

Passengers
- FY2018: 145

Services
Preceding station	JR East	Following station
Shimokita towards Noheji	Shimokita	Terminus
Shimokita towards Noheji	Ōminato Line	Terminus
Location
- Location within Aomori Prefecture Location within Japan

Ōminato Station (大湊駅, Ōminato-eki) is a railway station in the city of Mutsu, Aomori, Japan, operated by East Japan Railway Company (JR East).

== Lines ==
Ōminato Station is the northern terminus of the Ōminato Line, and lies 58.4 km from the southern terminus of the line at Noheji Station.

== Station layout ==
The station has two side platforms serving two terminating tracks. The station building has a Midori no Madoguchi staffed ticket office.

=== Platforms ===
1/2	■ Ōminato Line	for Noheji and Aomori

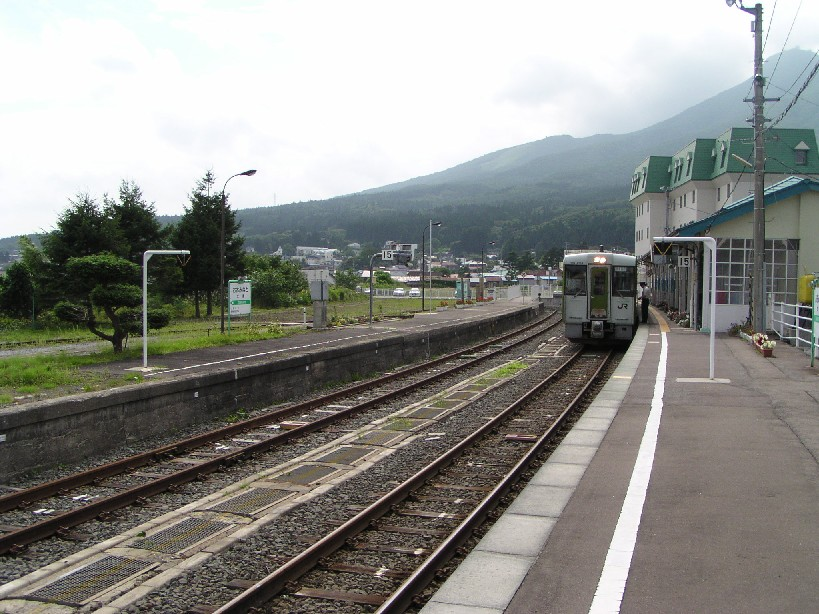
Platform, August 2003

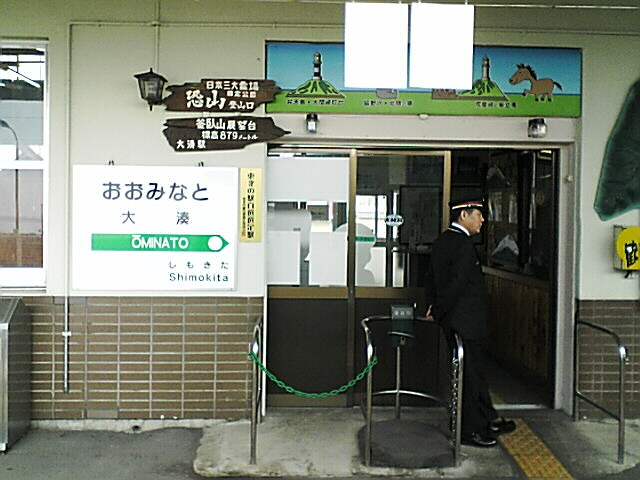
Exit gate

== History ==
Ōminato Station opened on September 25, 1921 as a station on the Japanese Government Railways (JGR). With the privatization of the Japanese National Railways (JNR, the successor to the JGR) on April 1, 1987, it came under the operational control of JR East.

== Bus services ==
- JR Bus Tohoku Company
  - For Wakinosawa via Kawaushi-Machi
  - For Tanabu

== Passenger statistics ==
In fiscal 2018, the station was used by an average of 145 passengers daily (boarding passengers only).

== Surrounding area ==
- National Route 338
- Ōminato Port

== See also ==
- List of railway stations in Japan
