= Japan National Route 279 =

National highway in Japan

National Route 279
- 国道279号
- Japan National Route 279 highlighted in red
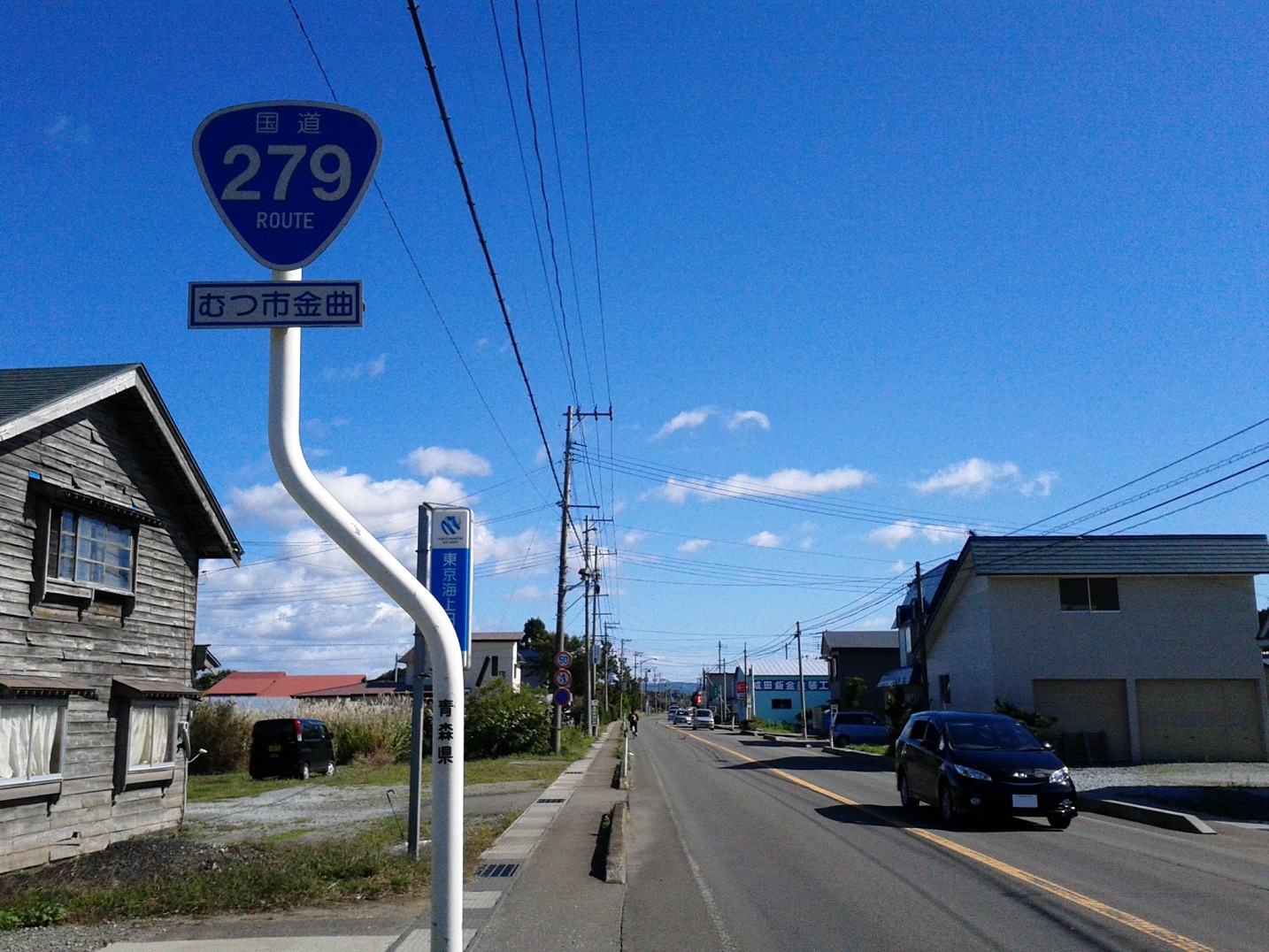

Route information
- Length: 134.0 km (83.3 mi)
- Existed: 1970–present

Major junctions
- North end: National Route 5 / National Route 278 in Hakodate, Hokkaido
- Ōma-Hakodate Ferry across Tsugaru Strait; National Route 338
- South end: National Route 4 in Noheji, Aomori

Location
- Country: Japan

Highway system
- National highways of Japan; Expressways of Japan
← National Route 278	→ National Route 280

National Route 279 (国道279号, Kokudō Nihyaku nana-jukyūgō) is a national highway of Japan that traverses the prefectures of Aomori and Hokkaido, as well as the Tsugaru Strait that separates them. The 134.0-kilometer (83.3 mi) highway begins at an intersection with National Route 5 in Hakodate, then crosses the Tsugaru Strait on a ferry from Hakodate to Ōma, Aomori, that it shares with National Route 279, where it then travels south through eastern Aomori Prefecture, passing through the city of Mutsu before ending at an intersection with National Route 4 in Noheji.

National Route 279's path across Aomori follows one of the oldest roads in northern Japan, a pilgrimage path called the Tanabu Kaidō (田名部街道) to Mount Osore, a caldera believed in Japanese mythology to be a gate to the underworld.

== Route description ==
=== Hakodate ===
National Route 279 begins at an intersection with National Route 5 in central Hakodate, east of Hakodate Station. The highway travels southwest through the city, then curves to the northwest, and turns northeast towards the former site of the city's ferry terminal, which was moved to the northwest of Hakodate Station. The highway's brief 1.8-kilometer (1.1 mi) route in Hokkaido ends at the former terminal, which has since been converted into a retail area. Aside from the last 100 meters (330 ft) of the highway near the ferry terminal, the highway also carries the Main Line of the Hakodate City Tram in its median.

=== Aomori Prefecture ===
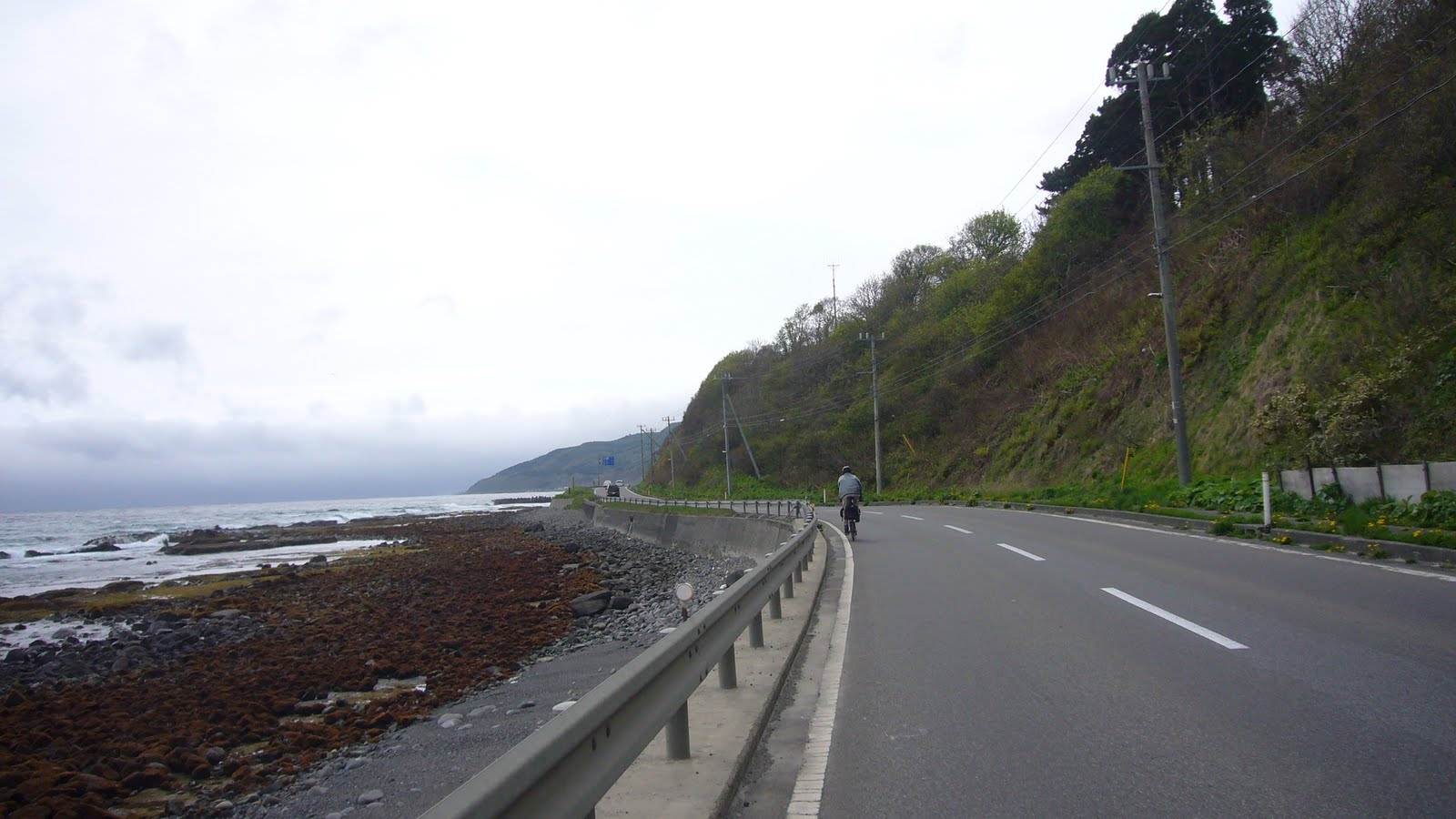
National Route 279 along the coast of the Tsugaru Strait

The highway is then carried south across the Tsugaru Strait via the Tsugaru Kaikyō Ferry to Ōma on the northern tip of Aomori Prefecture's Shimokita Peninsula. From the route's northern terminus in Hakodate to Ōma, National Route 338 runs concurrent with National Route 279; however, in Ōma, National Route 338 leaves the concurrency, traveling south while Route 279 heads southeast towards Mutsu. In Aomori, Route 279 is known as the Mutsu Hamanasu Line, named after the hamanasu, known in English as the Rosa rugosa, a shrub-like rose that grows on the beaches of Japan.

In Mutsu, it intersects with the northern end of the Mutsu Bypass, an auxiliary parallel route of the highway, and routes 279 and 338 briefly meet again, sharing a short concurrency. After traveling through the central district of the city together, National Route 338 leaves National Route 279 at the southern end of the Mutsu Bypass. It continues its path southeast across the peninsula while National Route 279 heads south towards Yokohama, and eventually Noheji at the southern base of the peninsula. The highway reaches a rest area on the north shore of the Miho River in Yokohama. Between Yokohama and Noheji, National Route 279 is closely paralleled by the Shimokita Expressway, a highway signed as an auxiliary route of National Route 279 that has supplanted the original route as the main thoroughfare between Yokohama and Noheji. The two highways meet at junction in southern Yokohama, where the original route continues south along Mutsu Bay while the expressway takes a more inland route through the village of Rokkasho. Upon entering Noheji, the route travels southwest through sparsely populated coastal woodlands before entering the central part of the town where it curves to the south. After passing by the town hall, the route terminates at an intersection with National Route 4.

=== Average daily traffic ===
National Route 279 is maintained by the Road Bureau of the Ministry of Land, Infrastructure, Transport and Tourism (MLIT), which conducts surveys on the Japan's national routes and expressways every five years to measure their average daily traffic. In 2015, the most utilized point along the route, was at the junction between it and Aomori Route 7 in Mutsu, where a daily average of 9,440 vehicles traveled on National Route 279. The least busy section of the highway was between the ferry terminal at Ōma and the intersection where the highway meets National Route 338, it carried an average of only 1,337 vehicles.

== History ==
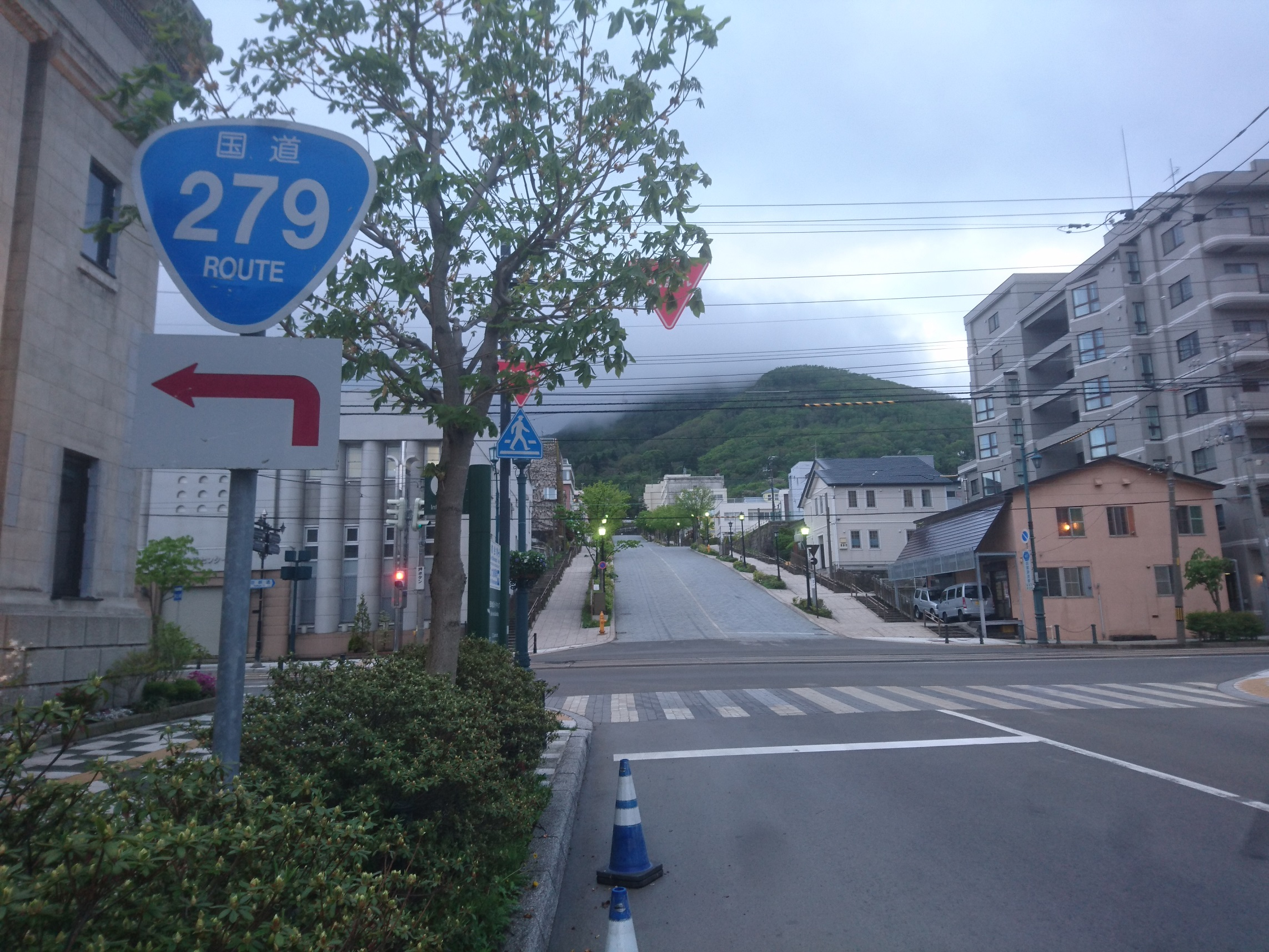
National Route 279 near the old ferry terminal in Hakodate

National Route 279 was preceded by the Tanabu-kaidō (田名部街道), a road established by the Nanbu clan during the Edo period as a branch of the longer Ōshū Kaidō (now known as National Route 4). It traveled between Noheji-shukuba and the Buddhist temple and folk religion pilgrimage destination of Mount Osore, believed to be a mystical gate to the underworld in both Ainu mythology and Japanese Buddhism, near the former town of Tanabu (now part of Mutsu). The road appears on maps as early as 1647, and by 1699 it was labeled as the Tanabu-kaidō on a map produced by the Nanbu. Pilgrimages along the Tanabu-kaidō to Mount Osore date back to 862, but it is uncertain if the establishment of a maintained road took place before the Nanbu built it.

National Route 279 was established by the Cabinet of Japan in 1970 along the Tanabu-kaidō between Noheji and Ōma, the ferry linking Ōma and Hakodate, and the short section in Hakodate. Since its designation, bypasses of the original route have been built, these include the incomplete, limited-access Shimokita Expressway between Noheji and Yokohama, as well as the Nimaibashi Bypass in Mutsu.

=== Incidents and closures ===
On 1 February 2012, a blizzard trapped 329 people on the highway in Aomori Prefecture. On 9 August 2021, most of a bridge over the Koaka River on the northern edge of Mutsu was washed away during Tropical Storm Lupit. No people were harmed as a result of the bridge collapse; however, it cut off direct highway access to Mutsu for the residents of Ōma and Kazamaura until a signalized one-lane bridge was built on 20 June 2022 to the south of the original to partially restore the connection.

== Major intersections ==
Prefecture	Location	km	mi	Destinations	Notes
Hokkaido	Hakodate	0.0	0.0	National Route 5 / National Route 278 north – to Sapporo, Oshamambe, Mount E	Northern terminus; northern end of Route 338 concurrency
Hokkaido	Hakodate	1.2	0.75	Hokkaido Route 675 (Tachimachi Misaki Hakodate Teishajō route)	
Hokkaido	Hakodate	1.7	1.1	Hokkaido Route 457 (Hakodate Gyokō route)	
Tsugaru Strait		1.8– 28.8	1.1– 17.9	Tsugaru Kaikyō Ferry	
Aomori	Ōma	30.0	18.6	National Route 338 south – to Hotokegaura, Sai	Southern end of Route 338 concurrency
Aomori	Mutsu	60.3	37.5	Aomori Prefecture Route 4 – to Osorezan	
Aomori	Mutsu	69.7	43.3	Aomori Prefecture Route 266 east – to Shiriyazaki	
Aomori	Mutsu	74.5	46.3	National Route 279 south (Mutsu Bypass)	
Aomori	Mutsu	75.3	46.8	National Route 338 (Ōminato Bypass)	
Aomori	Mutsu	76.0	47.2	Aomori Prefecture Route 6	
Aomori	Mutsu	76.5	47.5	National Route 338 north	Northern end of National Route 338 concurrency
Aomori	Mutsu	76.9	47.8	Aomori Prefecture Route 6 north – to Shiriyazaki	
Aomori	Mutsu	77.2	48.0	National Route 279 north (Mutsu Bypass) / National Route 338 south – to Hachinohe, Misawa	Southern end of National Route 338 concurrency
Aomori	Mutsu	78.6	48.8	Aomori Prefecture Route 4 north – to Osorezan, Central Mutsu	
Aomori	Mutsu	91.1	56.6	Aomori Prefecture Route 7 east – to Odanosawa	
Aomori	Yokohama	103.5	64.3	Aomori Prefecture Route 179 – to Yokohama Town office, Mutsu-Yokohama Station, Rokkasho	
Aomori	Yokohama	105.8	65.7	Aomori Prefecture Route 179 north – to Yokohama Town office, Mutsu-Yokohama Station	
Aomori	Yokohama	111.4	69.2	National Route 279 south (Shimokita Expressway) – to Aomori, Towada	Yokohama-Fukkoshi Interchange
Aomori	Noheji	121.9	75.7	Aomori Prefecture Route 180 east – to Rokkasho, Noheji-kita Interchange	
Aomori	Noheji	128.2	79.7	Aomori Prefecture Route 5 east – to Rokkasho, Noheji-kimyō Interchange	
Aomori	Noheji	131.7	81.8	Aomori Prefecture Route 243 west – to Aomori	
Aomori	Noheji	132.4	82.3	Aomori Prefecture Route 246 east – to Mizuhami	
Aomori	Noheji	133.0	82.6	Aomori Prefecture Route 178	
Aomori	Noheji	134.0	83.3	National Route 4 / National Route 45 – to Towada, Shichinohe, Aomori, Shichinohe-Towada Station	Southern terminus; National Route 45 is not signed
1.000 mi = 1.609 km; 1.000 km = 0.621 mi: Concurrency terminus

== Auxiliary routes ==
=== Shimokita Expressway ===
The Shimokita Expressway is an incomplete two-lane national expressway in Aomori Prefecture that is signed as an auxiliary route of National Route 279. The expressway travels south from Yokohama through the municipalities of Rokkasho and Noheji, where the main section of the expressway currently ends at an interchange with National Route 4. A short expressway stub opened in Mutsu in December 2019. When completed, the expressway will stretch 68 kilometers (42 mi) from Mutsu south to the town of Shichinohe.

=== Mutsu Bypass ===
The Mutsu Bypass is a 2.2-kilometer-long (1.4 mi) auxiliary route of National Route 279 in the central district of Mutsu. From its northern terminus with its parent route, it heads southeast and crosses over the Jotachi River. It has a junction with the Ōminato Bypass, an auxiliary route of National Route 338. After this junction the Mutsu Bypass travels south, paralleling the main line of National Route 279 until it reaches its southern terminus at the junction of National Routes 279 and 338.
