= Japan National Route 338 =

National highway in Japan

National Route 338
- 国道338号
- Japan National Route 338 highlighted in red
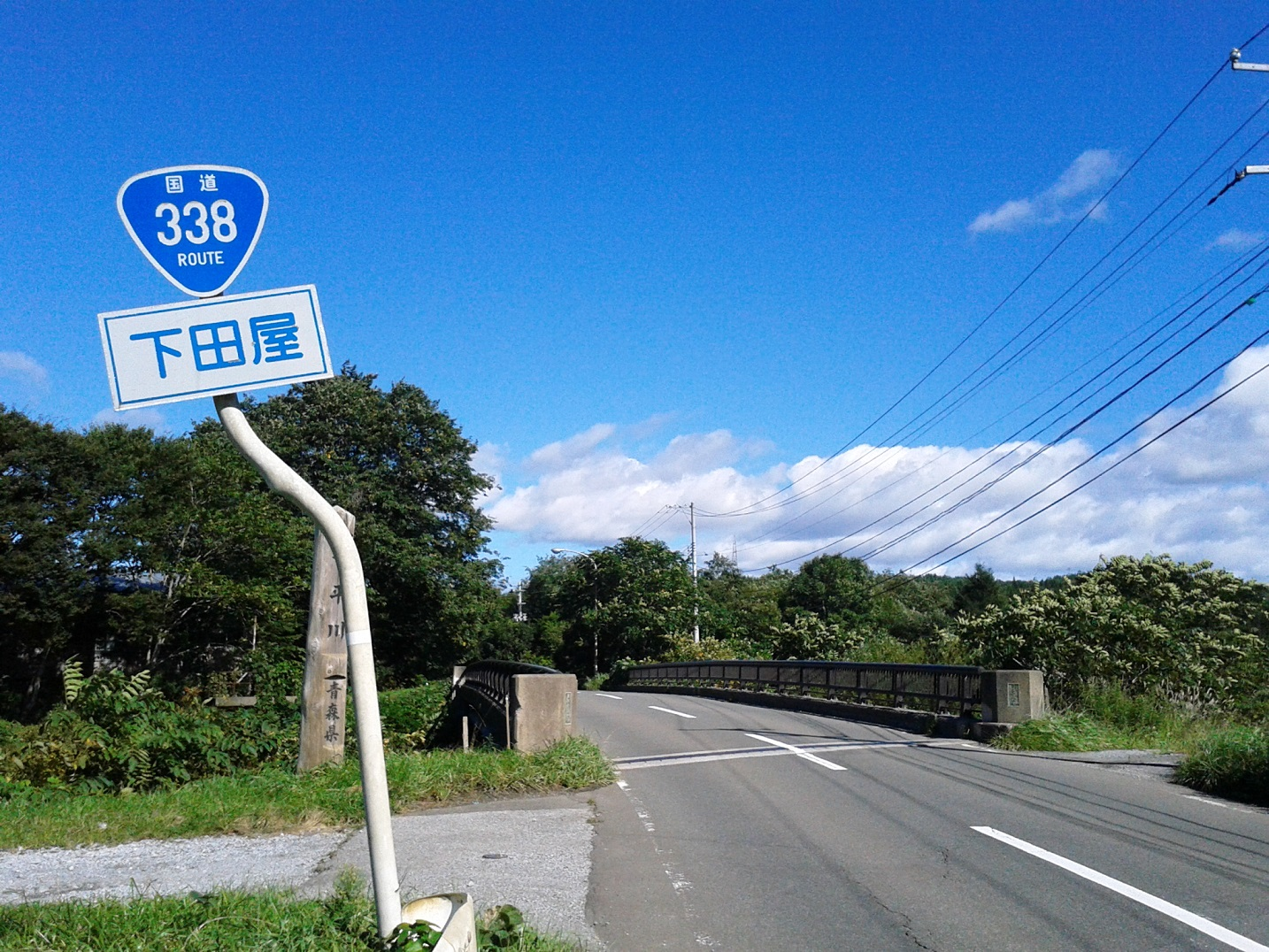

Route information
- Length: 241.3 km (149.9 mi)
- Existed: 1 April 1975–present

Major junctions
- North end: National Route 5 / National Route 278 in Hakodate, Hokkaido
- Tsugaru Kaikyo Ferry across Tsugaru Strait; National Route 279; Shimokita Expressway; National Route 394
- South end: National Route 45 in Oirase, Aomori

Location
- Country: Japan

Highway system
- National highways of Japan; Expressways of Japan
← National Route 337	→ National Route 339

National Route 338 (国道338号, Kokudō San hyaku san jūhachigō) is a national highway in the Japanese prefectures of Hokkaido and Aomori. Route 338 stretches 241.3 kilometers (149.9 mi) from National Route 5 in Hakodate, Hokkaido south across the Tsugaru Strait by ferry to Ōma, Aomori, around the western, southern, and eastern edges of the Shimokita Peninsula and finally to Oirase.

== Route description ==
=== Hakodate ===
National Route 338 begins at an intersection with National Route 5 in central Hakodate 150 meters (490 ft) east of Hakodate Station as part of an unsigned concurrency with National Route 279. The highway travels southwest along city streets through the city, then curves to the northwest, and turns northeast towards the former site of the city's ferry terminal, which was moved to the northwest of Hakodate Station. The highway's brief 1.8 kilometers (1.1 mi) route in Hokkaido ends at the former terminal, which has since been converted into a retail area. Aside from the last 100 meters (330 ft) of the highway near the ferry terminal, the highway also carries the Main Line of the Hakodate City Tram in its median.

=== Aomori Prefecture ===
The highway is next carried south across the Tsugaru Strait via the Tsugaru Kaikyō Ferry to Ōma on the northern tip of Aomori Prefecture's Shimokita Peninsula. From the route's northern terminus in Hakodate to Ōma, National Route 338 runs concurrent with National Route 279; however, in Ōma, National Route 279 leaves the concurrency, travelling southeast towards Mutsu while National Route 338 heads south towards the village of Sai. After passing through Sai, the highway enters the western edge of Mutsu and turns east towards the center of the city.

In Mutsu, national routes 279 and 338 briefly meet again, sharing a short concurrency. After leaving the concurrency, National Route 338 continues its path southeast across the peninsula while National Route 279 heads south towards Noheji at the southern base of the peninsula. National Route 338 parallels the Pacific coast for the rest of its route south through Higashidōri, Rokkasho, and Misawa before terminating in Oirase.

== History ==
National Route 338 was established by the Cabinet of Japan in 1975 between Hakodate and Oirase which was then the town of Shimoda, in Aomori.

== Major intersections ==
Prefecture	Location	km	mi	Destinations	Notes
Hokkaido	Hakodate	0.0	0.0	National Route 5 / National Route 278 north – to Sapporo, Oshamambe, Mount E	Northern terminus; northern end of Route 279 concurrency
Hokkaido	Hakodate	1.2	0.75	Hokkaido Route 675 (Tachimachi Misaki Hakodate Teishajō route)	
Hokkaido	Hakodate	1.7	1.1	Hokkaido Route 457 (Hakodate Gyokō route)	
Tsugaru Strait		1.8– 28.8	1.1– 17.9	Tsugaru Kaikyō Ferry	
Aomori	Ōma	30.0	18.6	National Route 279 – to Ōhata, Mutsu	Southern end of Route 279 concurrency
Aomori	Sai	42.3	26.3	Aomori Route 284	
Aomori	Sai	42.9	26.7	Aomori Route 46 (Kamoshika Line)	
Aomori	Sai	44.0	27.3	Aomori Route 46 south	
Aomori	Sai	77.5	48.2	Aomori Route 253 east	
Aomori	Mutsu	102.1	63.4	Aomori Route 175 west	
Aomori	Mutsu	120.4	74.8	Aomori Route 46 north (Kamoshika Line)	
Aomori	Mutsu	140.1	87.1	National Route 338 east (Ōminato Bypass)	
Aomori	Mutsu	142.8	88.7	Aomori Route 272	
Aomori	Mutsu	145.1	90.2	Aomori Route 4	
Aomori	Mutsu	145.3	90.3	National Route 279 north – to Ōhata, Ōma	Northern end of Route 279 concurrency
Aomori	Mutsu	146.0	90.7	National Route 279 south (Mutsu Hamana Line) / National Route 394 south – to Noheji	Southern end of Route 279 concurrency, northern end of unsigned Route 394 concurrency
Aomori	Mutsu	147.6	91.7	Shimokita Expressway	Mutsu-Higashidōri Interchange
Aomori	Higashidōri	163.4	101.5	Aomori Route 248 north	
Aomori	Higashidōri	169.4	105.3	Aomori Route 7 west	
Aomori	Rokkasho	183.7	114.1	Aomori Route 179 west	
Aomori	Rokkasho	193.9	120.5	National Route 338 south (Obuchi Bypass)	
Aomori	Rokkasho	197.5	122.7	Aomori Route 24 west	
Aomori	Rokkasho	199.4	123.9	Aomori Route 180 west	
Aomori	Rokkasho	203.2	126.3	National Route 338 north (Obuchi Bypass)	
Aomori	Rokkasho	208.7	129.7	National Route 394 south – to Shichinohe, Tōhoku, Noheji	Southern end of unsigned Route 394 concurrency
Aomori	Misawa	213.1	132.4	Aomori Route 170 south	
Aomori	Misawa	230.1	143.0	Aomori Route 10 west	
Aomori	Misawa	232.6	144.5	Aomori Route 254 west	
Aomori	Oirase	236.9	147.2	Aomori Route 19 south	
Aomori	Oirase	241.3	149.9	National Route 45 / Aomori Route 283 east – to National Route 4, Towada, Kuji, Hachinohe	Southern terminus
1.000 mi = 1.609 km; 1.000 km = 0.621 mi: Concurrency terminus
