= Shimokita Expressway =

Road in Aomori prefecture, Japan

Shimokita Expressway
- 下北半島縦貫道路 (Shimokita Hantō Jūkandōro)

Route information
- Length: 25.3 km (15.7 mi)
- Existed: 2004–present
- Component highways: National Route 279

Major junctions
- South end: Noheji Interchange; National Route 4 in Tōhoku, Aomori

Section 1
- North end: Fukkoshi Interchange; National Route 279 in Yokohama, Aomori

Incomplete Yokohama-Mutsu Section
- Length: 36.1 km (22.4 mi)
- South end: Fukkoshi Interchange; National Route 279 in Yokohama, Aomori
- North end: Mutsu Interchange; National Route 338 in Mutsu, Aomori

Location
- Country: Japan

Highway system
- National highways of Japan; Expressways of Japan

The Shimokita Expressway (下北半島縦貫道路, Shimokita Hantō Jūkandōro) is a two-lane national expressway in Aomori Prefecture, Japan. The expressway connects Noheji to the municipalities of Rokkasho, and Yokohama. It is owned and operated by Ministry of Land, Infrastructure, Transport and Tourism (MLIT), and is signed as an auxiliary route of National Route 279, but has no expressway number under their "2016 Proposal for Realization of Expressway Numbering."

== Route description ==
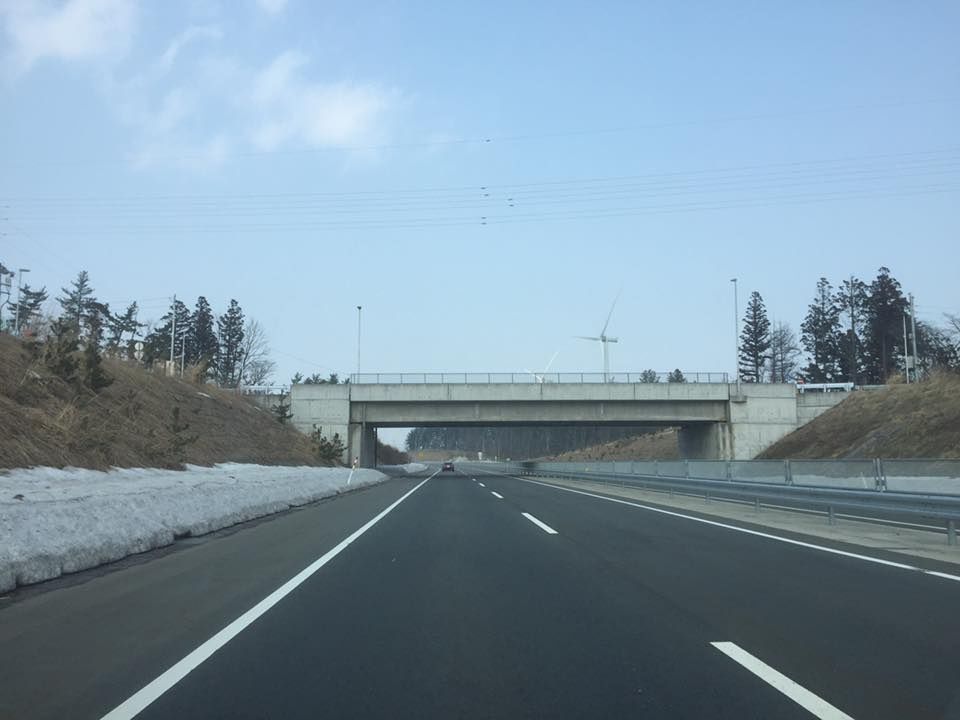
The Shimokita Expressway in Rokkasho.

The southern terminus of the Shimokita Expressway is at a signaled intersection with National Route 4 in Tōhoku. From here, the expressway immediately loops from a western heading to the northeastern one. Along the short loop it crosses into Noheji, back into Tōhoku, then into Noheji once more after crossing over National Route 4. The expressway then crosses over the Aoimori Railway Line and proceeds north.
From Noheji heading north through the Shimokita Peninsula, the expressway parallels the mainline of National Route 279. After a couple of interchanges, the expressway enters the village, Rokkasho. The expressway's importance in the village is critical due to the presence of multiple nuclear facilities.
The expressway heads northeast while in Rokkasho. It crosses into the town of Yokohama where it meets its temporary northern terminus at the main line of National Route 279. While the expressway primarily has only one lane traveling in each direction, short passing lanes are available near Noheji-kimyo, Noheji-kita, and Rokkasho interchanges.

== History ==
Planning began of the route commenced on 16 December 16, 1994. On 26 November 2004, the first section of the expressway opened to traffic between Noheji-half and Noheji-kita Interchanges. On 2 December 2005 the expressway was extended south to the current southern terminus at Noheji Interchange. On 13 November 2012 the expressway was extended north from Noheji-kita to Rokkasho Interchange. On 15 November 2017, the expressway opened to traffic between Rokkasho Interchange and Fukkoshi Interchange. On 23 December 2019, the first section of the expressway in Mutsu opened.

== Future ==
The government of Aomori Prefecture plans for the Shimokita Expressway to be extended from both its northern terminus at Fukkoshi Interchange and its southern terminus at Noheji Interchange. From Fukkoshi, the expressway is to be extended 36.1 kilometers (22.4 mi) to Mutsu Interchange in the city of Mutsu in the northern part of Aomori. As of January 2018, some of this section is under construction. From Noheji Interchange, the expressway will be extended to a junction with the Kamikita Expressway and Michinoku Toll Road. On 11 January 2019, the governor of Aomori Prefecture, Shingo Mimura requested the Liberal Democratic Party's help in providing funding for the section between Noheji and Shichinohe. MLIT announced later in 2019 that the section between Noheji and Shichinohe will be evaluated to determine if the expressway should be extended.

== Junction list ==
The entire expressway is in Aomori Prefecture.

Location	km	mi	Exit	Name	Destinations	Notes
Shichinohe	0.0	0.0	—	Tenmabashi	Kamikita Expressway / Michinoku Toll Road – Hachinohe, Aomori	The connection between Michinoku Toll Road and Kamikita Expressway is under construction, however this work does not yet include a connection to the Shimokita Expressway.
Tōhoku	7.0	4.3	—	Noheji	National Route 4 – Noheji, Hiranai	Current southern terminus of the expressway.
Noheji	13.9	8.6	—	Noheji-half	Unnamed road	
Noheji	20.2	12.6	—	Noheji-kita	Aomori Prefecture Route 156 – Rokkasho	
Rokkasho	26.5	16.5	—	Rokkasho	Unnamed road – Rokkasho, Mutsu	Provides access to/from nuclear facilities
Yokohama	32.3	20.1	—	Fukkoshi	National Route 279 – Mutsu	
Gap in the expressway, connection is made by National Route 279
Mutsu	3.4	2.1	—	Mutsu-Higashidōri	National Route 338 / National Route 394	The kilometer posts for the Mutsu section of the expressway denote the distance traveled from Mutsu Interchange unlike the posts for the southern section of the expressway that denote the distance traveled from Noheji Interchange
Mutsu	2.1	1.3	—	Mutsu-Shiriyazaki	Aomori Prefecture Route 6 – Mutsu, Cape Shiriya	Current northern terminus
Mutsu	0.0	0.0	—	Mutsu	National Route 279 (Mutsu Bypass); National Route 338 (Ōminato Bypass)	
1.000 mi = 1.609 km; 1.000 km = 0.621 mi: Incomplete access; Unopened

== See also ==
- Japan National Route 279
