= Japan Nuclear Fuel Limited =

Japanese nuclear energy company

- Company type: Public
- Industry: Uranium enrichment Nuclear fuel reprocessing Nuclear fuel waste management
- Founded: July 1992
- Headquarters: 大字尾駮字沖付4-108, Rokkasho, Aomori, Japan
- Key people: 兒島伊左美, President 勝俣恒久, Head of Board of Directors
- Revenue: ¥106 billion yen (2006/3)
- Number of employees: 2040 (2006/3)
- Website: www.jnfl.co.jp

Japan Nuclear Fuel Ltd. (JNFL) (日本原燃 Nihon Gennen) is a nuclear energy company based in Rokkasho, Aomori Prefecture, Japan involved in the production of nuclear fuel, as well as the reprocessing, storage and disposal of nuclear waste. The mission of Japan Nuclear Fuel Limited is to establish a nuclear fuel cycle infrastructure in Japan.

In uranium enrichment JNFL plans to provide for an ultimate capacity of 1,500 ton-SWU/year, enough to meet one third of the nuclear fuel needs of all nuclear power plants in Japan. The first generation Uranium Enrichment Plant in Rokkasho, Aomori operated 1992 to 2010 with a capacity of up to 1,050 ton-SWU/year, which is equivalent to the nuclear fuel used by 8 or 9 reactors at 1,000 MW-class nuclear plants. A second generation plant using centrifuges with composite carbon-fibre rotors started operating in 2011.

Rokkasho Reprocessing Plant, Japan's first commercial reprocessing plant, began reprocessing in 2007, however complications have delayed full commercial operation until 2012. The plant has a design reprocessing capacity of 800 tonnes-U/year, enough to reprocess the spent fuel produced by 30 reactors at 1,000 MW-class nuclear power stations, though full capacity has yet to be realized. Responding to a December 1998 request from The Federation of Electric Power Companies, JNFL has been conducting technological studies regarding MOX fuel fabrication technology. According to the current plan, Japanese electric power companies will be implementing Plutonium-Thermal utilization (MOX) with 16 to 18 of the nuclear reactors operating in Japan. In late October 2010, work formally got under way on a 130 tonne/year J-MOX fuel fabrication plant, which is located on the same site as the Rokkasho Reprocessing Plant.

JNFL also operates low and high level nuclear waste long-term storage facilities which will accommodate 2,880 canisters of vitrified high level waste and the ultimate capacity of the Low-Level Radioactive Waste Disposal Center now under construction will be 600,000 m^{3}.

== See also ==
- Nuclear power in Japan
