= Hamashiriya Shell Mound =

Muromachi period shell midden in Higashidōri, Tõhoku, Japan

Hamashiriya Shell Midden
- 浜尻屋貝塚 (Japanese)
- Hamashiriya Shell Midden Hamashiriya Shell Mound (Japan)
- 41°24′38″N 141°27′31″E
- Type: shell midden, settlement
- Periods: Muromachi period
- Location: Higashidōri, Aomori, Japan
- Region: Tōhoku region

History
- Built: circa 1400 AD
- Abandoned: circa 1530 AD

Site notes
- Elevation: 30 m (98 ft)
- Public access: Yes (no public facilities)
- National Historic Site of Japan

The Hamashiriya Shell Midden (浜尻屋貝塚, Hamashiriya Kaizuka) is an archaeological site consisting of a series of Shell middens and the remains of an adjacent settlement located in the village of Higashidōri on the Shimokita Peninsula of Aomori Prefecture in the Tōhoku region of far northern Japan. It has been protected by the central government as a National Historic Site since 2006.

== Overview ==
Shell middens have been found in many locations in Japan, and are usually associated with Jōmon period settlements. The shell middens located on Cape Shiriyazaki are highly unusual in that they date from the Muromachi period, and consist almost exclusively of abalone shells, with an average diameter of around six centimeters. During the Muromachi period, trade between Japan and China flourished, and dried abalone was an important export product, mentioned frequently in contemporary documents.

The site consists of a series of 14 shell middens dating from the early 14th to the mid-15th centuries AD. Also on the site were the remains of ovens and the foundation holes for several buildings and wells. Both Japanese and Chinese coins and fragments of both Japanese and Chinese ceramics have been found at the site. These finds led archaeologists to the conclusion that the site was an early factory for the production of dried abalone. It is uncertain of any trade took place directly from this site with China, although the presence of Chinese coins and ceramics raises the possibility. In an excavation conducted in 2002, a fragment of a human skull was found at the site, and upon analysis was determined to date from about 500 to 700 years ago and share traits belonging to both Ainu and contemporary Japanese.

There are no public facilities at the site, which is located approximately 10 minutes by car from the JR East Shimokita Station.

== See also ==
- List of Historic Sites of Japan (Aomori)
