= Tsugaru Kaikyō Ferry =

Passenger ferry crossing the Tsugaru Strait

Tsugaru Kaikyō Ferry 津軽海峡フェリー
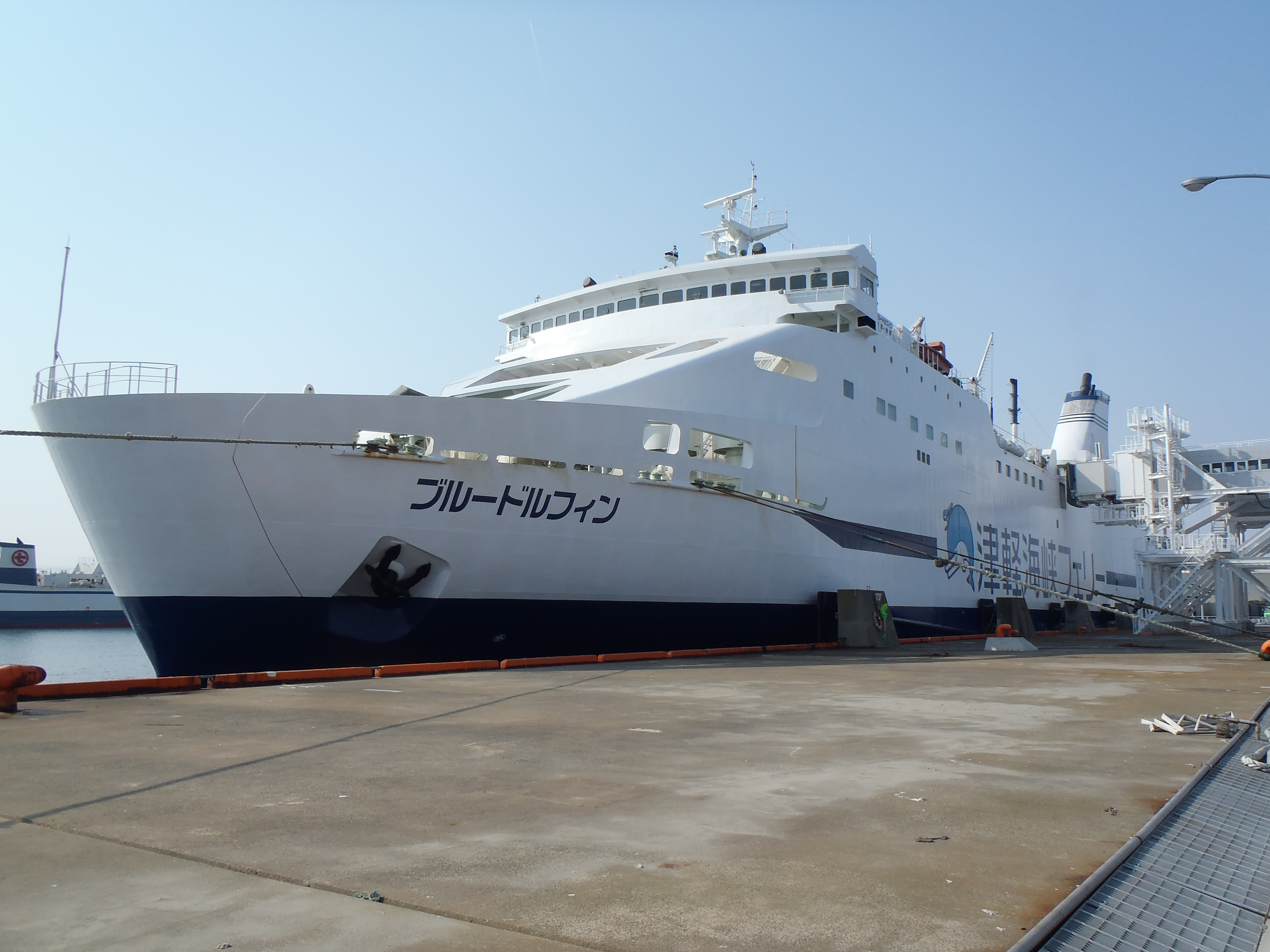
- The Blue Dolphin at Aomori
- Locale: Japan
- Waterway: Tsugaru Strait
- Transit type: Ferry
- Began operation: February 23, 1972
- No. of lines: 3
- No. of vessels: 5
- No. of terminals: 4
- Website: www.tsugarukaikyo.co.jp

The Tsugaru Kaikyō Ferry (津軽海峡フェリー, Tsugaru Strait Ferry) is a privately owned ferry service crossing the Tsugaru Strait, which separates Hokkaido from Honshu. The ferries run three routes: Hakodate to Aomori and Hakodate to Ōma, Muroran to Aomori.

== Routes ==
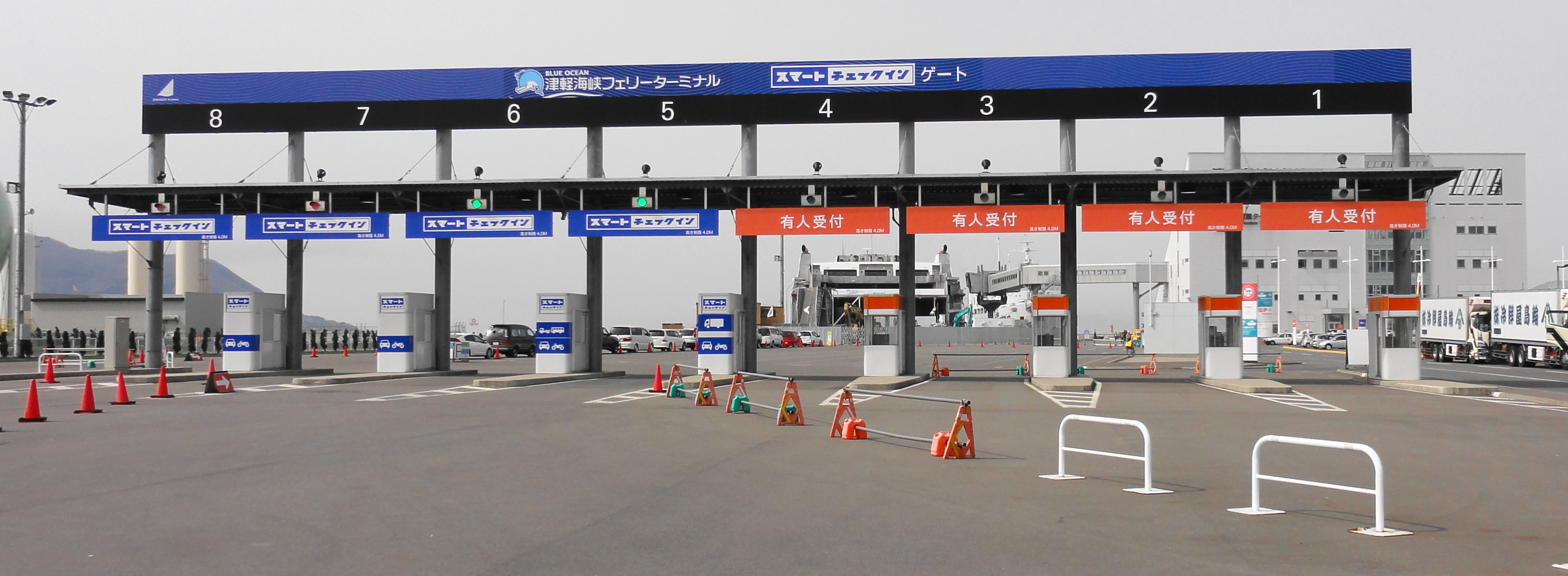
Automated car entrance at Port of Hakodate

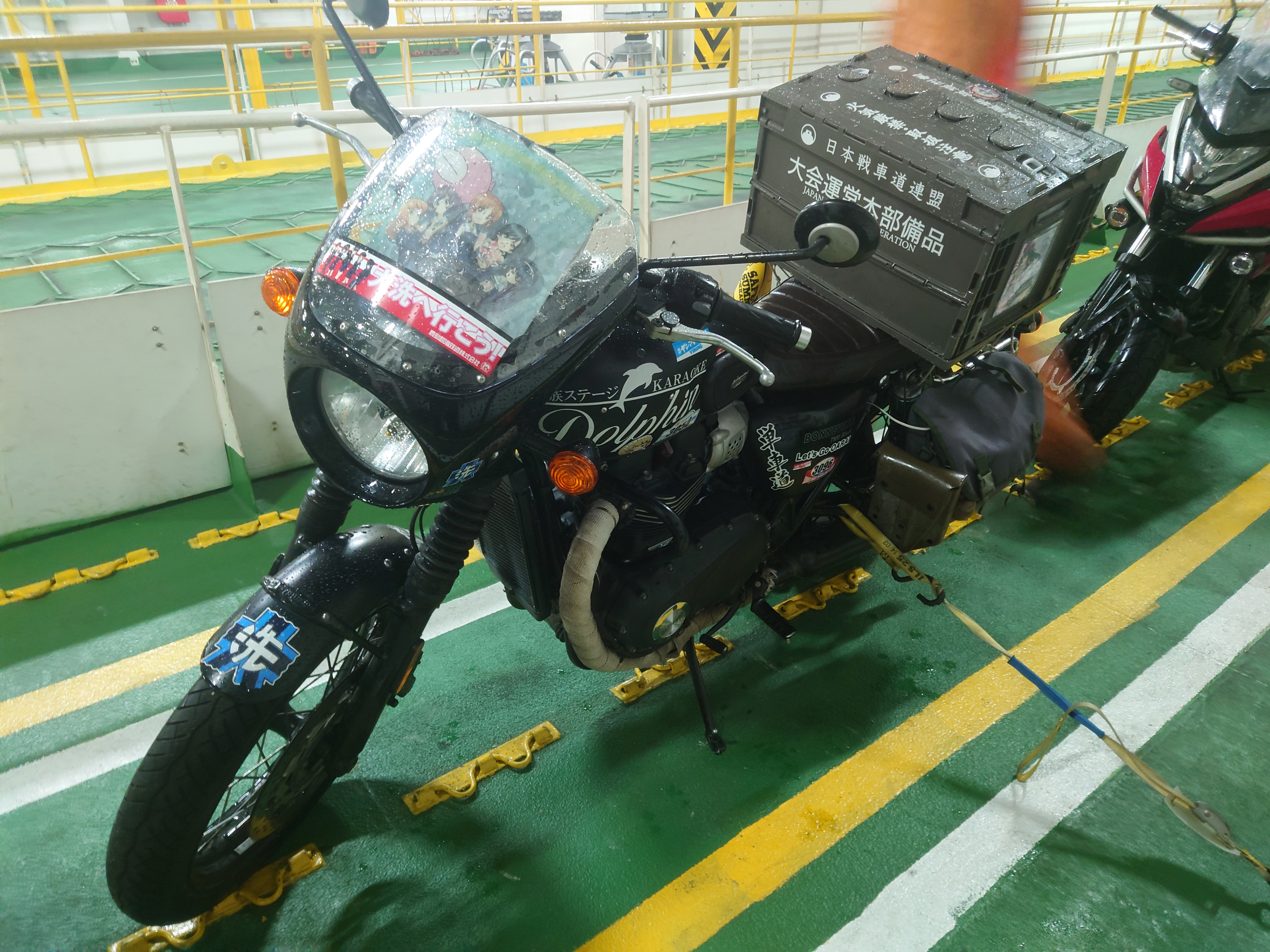
During summer, the biggest touring season, a large number of motorcycles are tied up on board.

=== Hakodate—Aomori ===
This route links the Port of Hakodate in Hakodate, Hokkaido with the Port of Aomori in Aomori. 6 round trips are made per day, with each trip taking three hours and forty minutes one way. The route is operated by four ships: the Blue Dolphin, Blue Happiness, and Blue Luminous. Each ship makes two round trips a day. With the conversion of the Seikan Tunnel from conventional trains into the Hokkaido Shinkansen, this route has seen a resurgence in ridership as the cheaper alternative. It connects Japan National Route 4 in Aomori with Japan National Route 5 in Hakodate.

=== Hakodate—Ōma ===
This route links Hakodate with the Port of Ōma in Ōma, Aomori. National Routes 279 and 338 run along this route as well. A trip takes ninety minutes one way, and is operated by the Daikanmaru (大函丸) with two round trips a day.

=== Muroran—Aomori ===
This route links the Port of Muroran in Muroran with the Aomori. 6 round trips are made per week, with each trip taking seven hours one way. The route is operated by Blue Mermaid.

== History ==
Since 1965, the Higashi Nihon Ferry (東日本フェリー, East Japan Ferry) was the primary operator of passenger ferries across the Tsugaru Strait. Aside from the current routes, the Higashi Nihon Ferry also operated a wide network connecting Muroran, Tomakomai, and Iwanai to the north; Sendai, Hachinohe, Ōarai, and Jōetsu to the south; and Busan, South Korea. However, these lines proved to be less and less profitable and closed one after another.

Meanwhile, the Dōnan Jidōsha Ferry (道南自動車フェリー, South Hokkaido Car Ferry) was founded in 1972 as a part of Higashi Nihon Ferry, ro-ro cargo service between Hakodate and Aomori. In October 2000, Dōnan Jidōsha Ferry began operating passenger services with a newly built ship, the Esan 2000. In November 2008, Higashi Nihon Ferry suspended its Hakodate—Aomori, Hakodate—Ōma, and Muroran—Aomori services and sold three ships (Venus, Virgo, and Vayu) to Dōnan Jidōsha Ferry. Dōnan Jidōsha Ferry, however, chose not to operate the Muroran—Aomori route. On November 1, 2009, Higashi Nihon Ferry was merged into Dōnan Jidōsha Ferry, and the resulting company was renamed as Tsugaru Kaikyō Ferry.

== Fleet ==
Ship	Built	Route	Gross tonnage	Length	Width	Passengers	Cars	Speed
Daikan Maru	2013	Hakodate-Ōma	1,912	90.7 m	15.7 m	478	21 Trucks or 60 Cars	18
Blue Mermaid	2014	Hakodate-Aomori	8,860	144 m	23.0 m	510	71 Trucks or 230 Cars	20
Blue Dolphin (2nd generation)	2016	Hakodate-Aomori	8,850	144 m	23.0 m	583	71 Trucks or 230 Cars	20
Blue Happiness	2017	Hakodate-Aomori	8,851	144 m	23.0 m	583	71 Trucks or 230 Cars	20
Blue Grace	2025	Muroran-Aomori	8,897	144 m	23.0 m	422	65 Trucks or 230 Cars	20
