= Japan National Route 276 =

National highway in Japan

National Route 276
- 国道276号
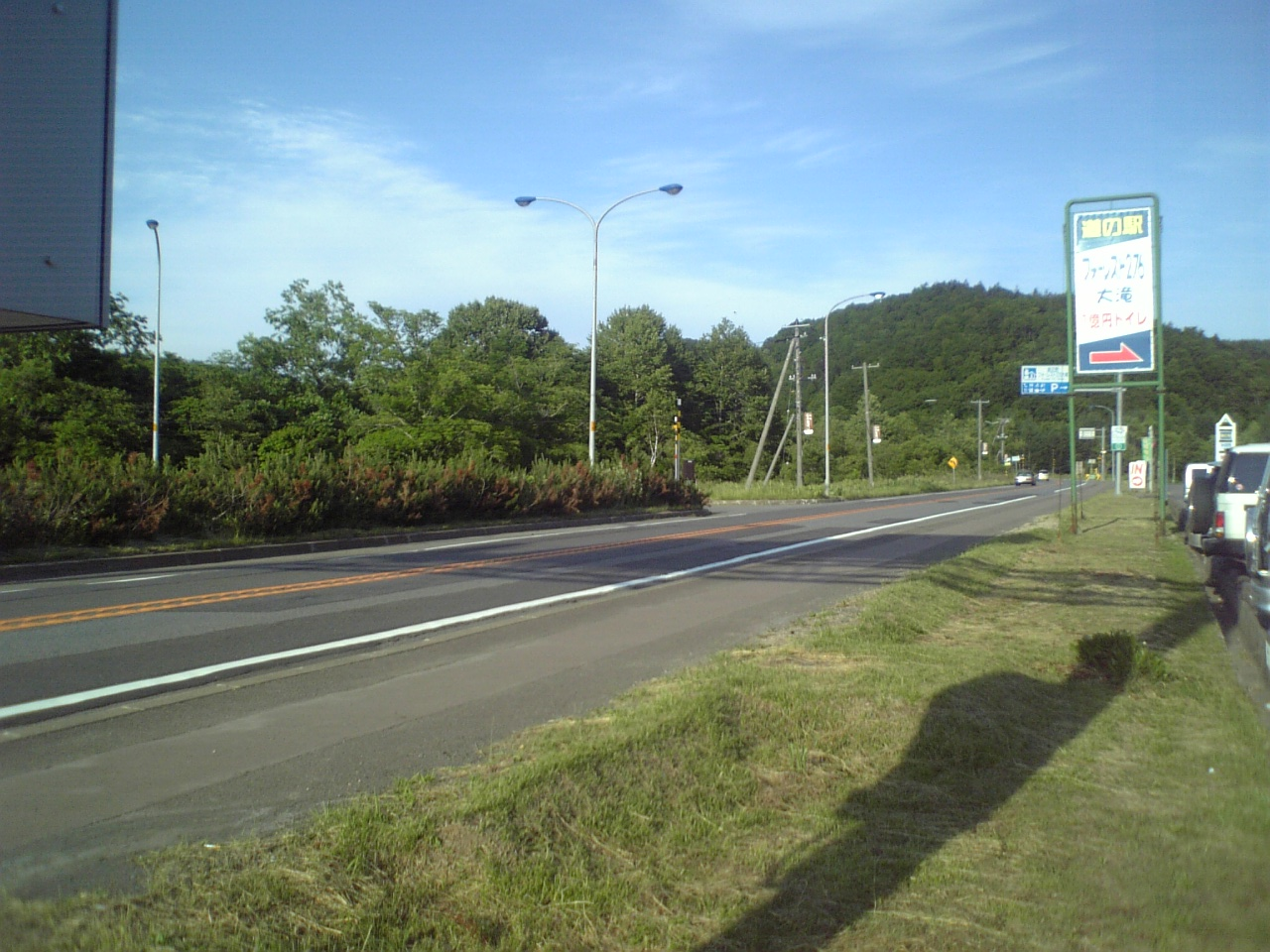

Route information
- Length: 315.4 km (196.0 mi)

Location
- Country: Japan

Highway system
- National highways of Japan; Expressways of Japan
← National Route 275	→ National Route 277

National Route 276 is a national highway of Japan connecting Esashi, Hokkaidō and Tomakomai, Hokkaidō in Japan, with a total length of 315.4 km (195.98 mi).
