= Japan National Route 277 =

Road in Hokkaido, Japan

National Route 277
- 国道277号
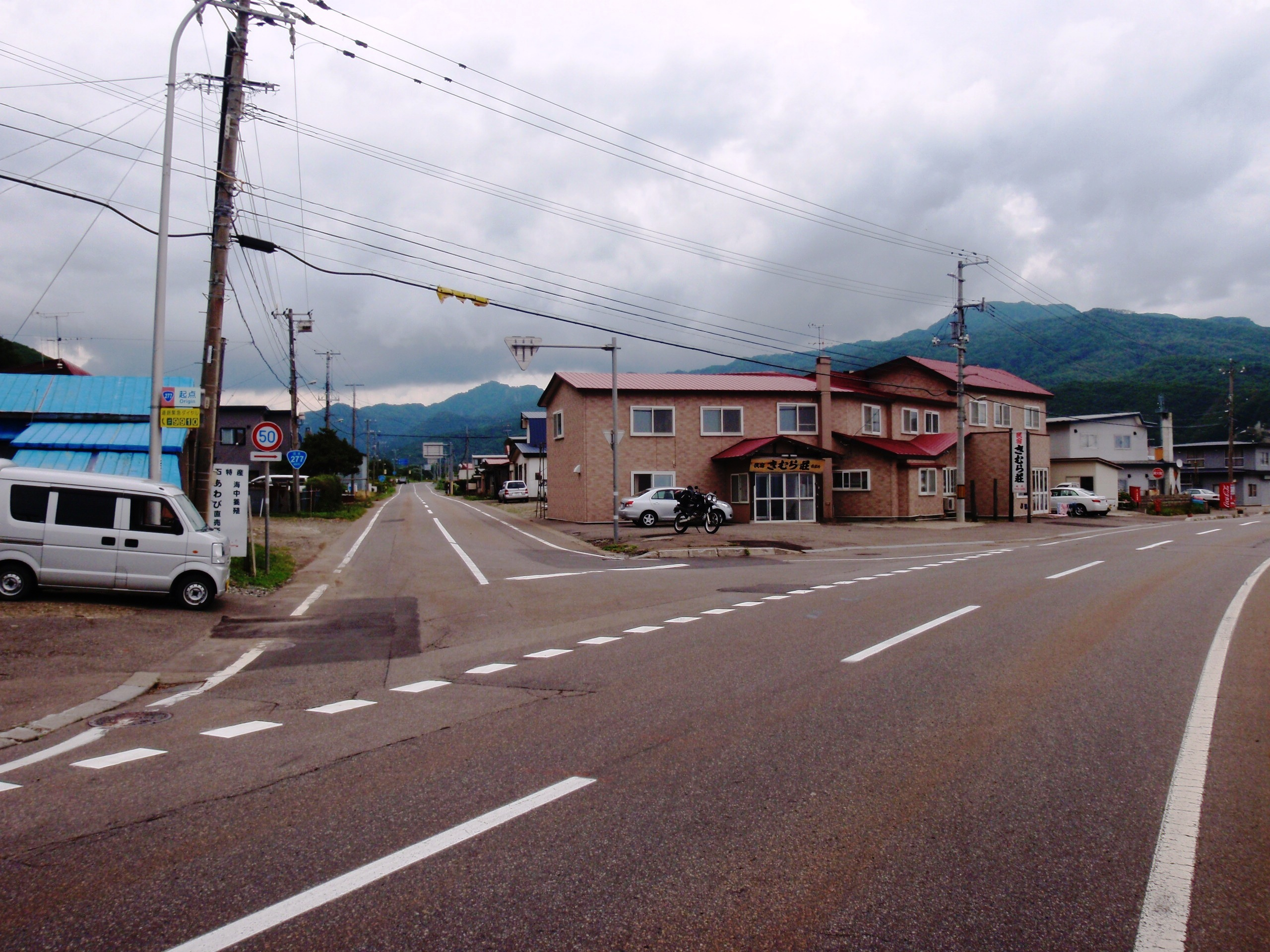

Route information
- Length: 61.0 km (37.9 mi)

Location
- Country: Japan

Highway system
- National highways of Japan; Expressways of Japan
← National Route 276	→ National Route 278

National Route 277 is a national highway of Japan connecting Esashi, Hokkaidō and Yakumo, Hokkaidō in Japan, with a total length of 61 km (37.9 mi).
