= Higashidōri =

Higashidōri 東通村
- Village
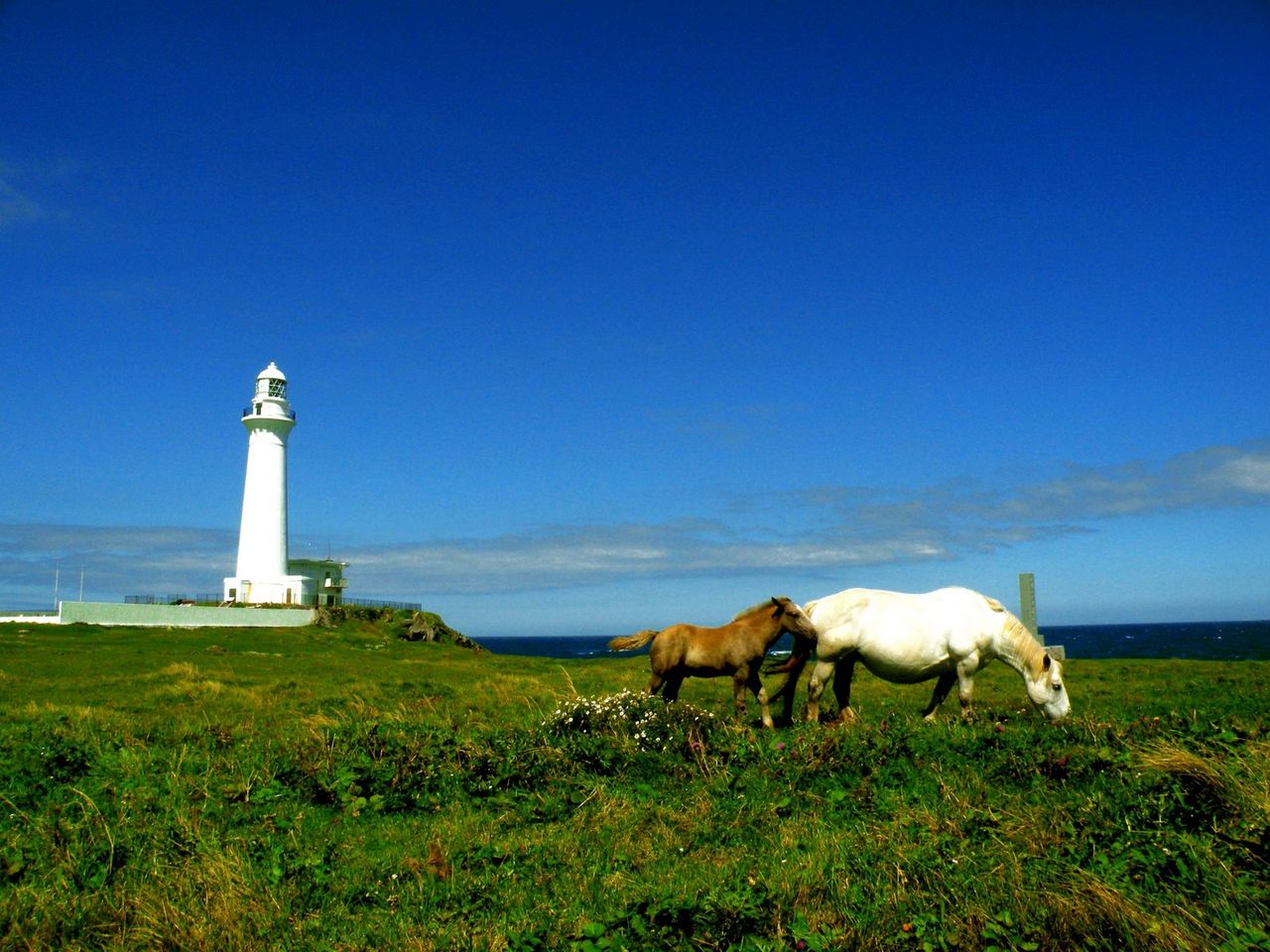
- Shiriyazaki Lighthouse & Kandachime horses

- Flag Seal

- Interactive map of Higashidōri
- Coordinates: 41°16′41″N 141°19′46″E
- Country: Japan
- Region: Tōhoku
- Prefecture: Aomori
- District: Shimokita

Area
  - Total: 295.32 km^{2} (114.02 sq mi)

Population (December 31, 2025)
  - Total: 5,415
  - Density: 18.34/km^{2} (47.49/sq mi)
- Time zone: UTC+9 (Japan Standard Time)
- Phone number: 0175-27-2111
- Address: 5-34 Isogomata Sawanai, Higashidōri-mura, Shimokita-gun, Aomori-ken 039-4292
- Climate: Cfb/Dfb
- Website: Official website
- Symbols
- Bird: Slaty-backed gull
- Flower: Iris
- Tree: Japanese yew

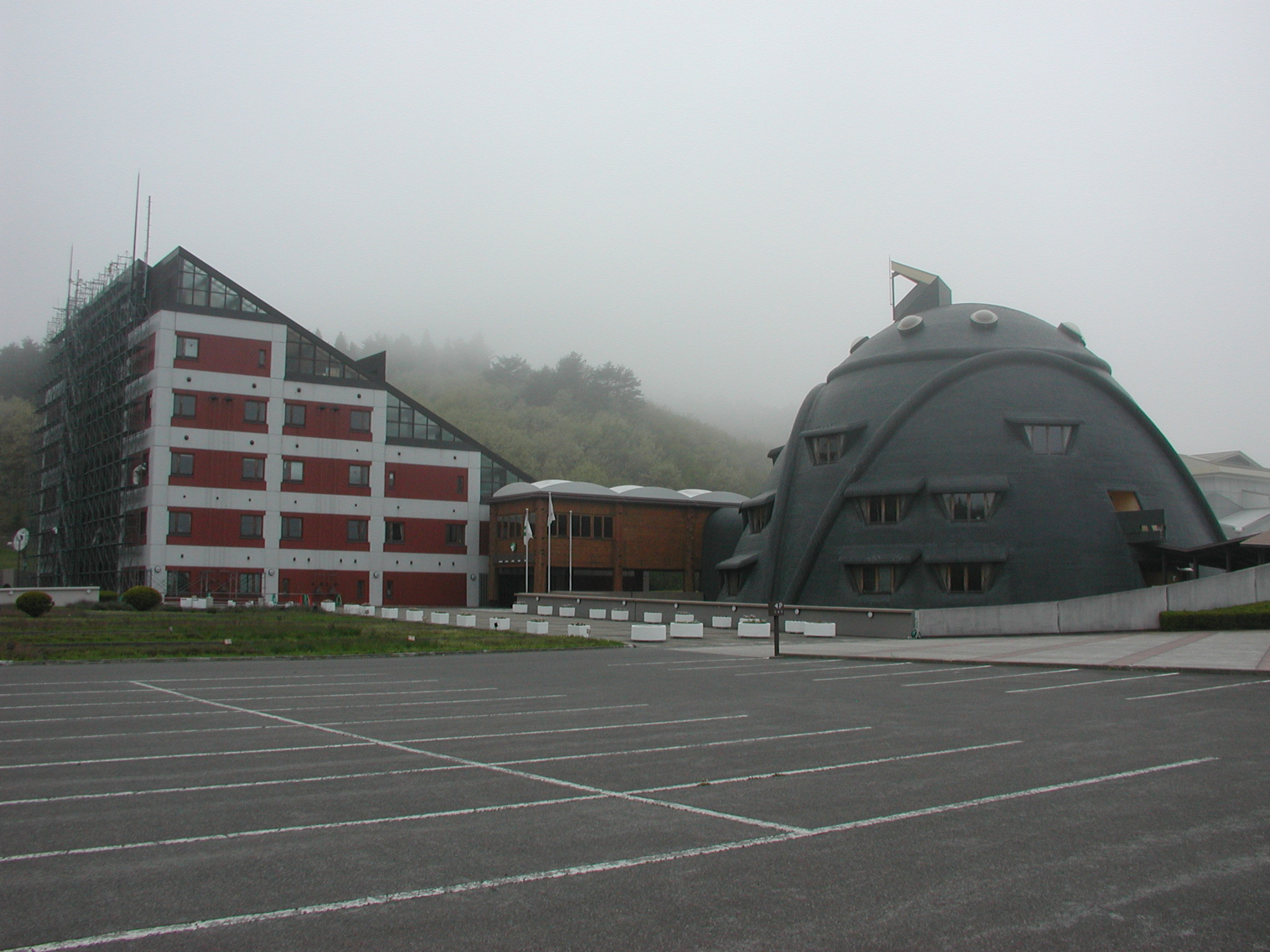
Higashidōri Village Office

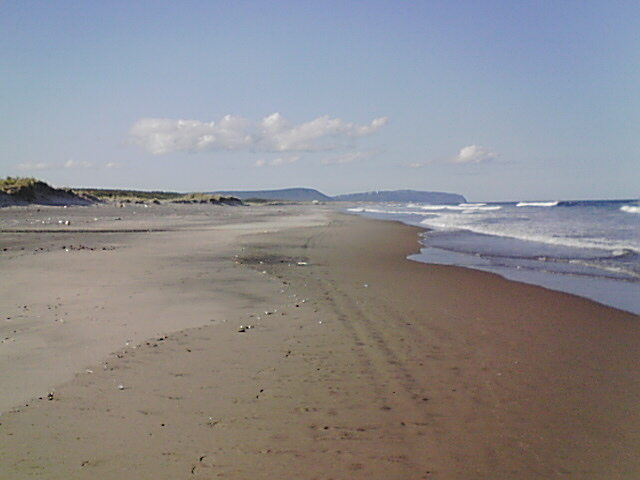
Sarugamori sand dunes

Higashidōri (東通村, Higashidōri-mura) is a village located in Aomori, Japan. As of 31 December 2025, the village had an estimated population of 5,415 in 2726 households, and a population density of 18 persons per km^{2}. Its total area is 295.32 square kilometres (114.02 sq mi).

== Geography ==
Higashidōri occupies the northeastern coastline of Shimokita Peninsula, facing the Pacific Ocean to the east and Tsugaru Strait to the north, with Cape Shiriya forming a boundary between the two waters. The low Shimokita Hills run north–south through the center of the village. Mount Kuwabata, the highest point in the village at an elevation of 402 meters. To the west of the Shimokita Hills is the Tanabe Plain, which borders Mutsu City. There are large sand dunes and several swamps near the eastern coast, and many rivers flow to the sea. Hamlets are scattered throughout the coastline of the village, which does not have a well-defined center. Parts of the village are within the limits of the Shimokita Hantō Quasi-National Park. In the year 2002, the Ministry of the Environment classified some tidal flats of the Higashidōri shoreline to be one of the 500 Important Wetlands in Japan and an important wintering place for Brent geese.

=== Neighbouring municipalities ===
Aomori Prefecture

- Mutsu
- Rokkasho
- Yokohama

=== Climate ===
The village has a cold humid continental climate (Köppen climate classification Dfb) characterized by short, cool summers and long, cold winters with heavy snowfall. The average annual temperature in Higashidōri is 8.6 °C. The average annual rainfall is 1268 mm with September as the wettest month. The temperatures are highest on average in August, at around 21.4 °C, and lowest in January, at around -3.0 °C.

Climate data for Odanosawa, Higashidōri (1991−2020 normals, extremes 1976−present)
Month	Jan	Feb	Mar	Apr	May	Jun	Jul	Aug	Sep	Oct	Nov	Dec	Year
Record high °C (°F)	10.8 (51.4)	14.9 (58.8)	20.4 (68.7)	26.4 (79.5)	31.1 (88.0)	29.9 (85.8)	33.5 (92.3)	34.9 (94.8)	33.6 (92.5)	26.7 (80.1)	21.5 (70.7)	19.2 (66.6)	34.9 (94.8)
Mean daily maximum °C (°F)	2.0 (35.6)	2.6 (36.7)	6.2 (43.2)	11.6 (52.9)	15.7 (60.3)	18.3 (64.9)	22.2 (72.0)	24.5 (76.1)	22.7 (72.9)	17.5 (63.5)	11.1 (52.0)	4.6 (40.3)	13.3 (55.9)
Daily mean °C (°F)	−1.0 (30.2)	−0.7 (30.7)	2.3 (36.1)	7.2 (45.0)	11.5 (52.7)	14.7 (58.5)	18.9 (66.0)	21.2 (70.2)	18.7 (65.7)	12.9 (55.2)	6.8 (44.2)	1.2 (34.2)	9.5 (49.1)
Mean daily minimum °C (°F)	−4.6 (23.7)	−4.8 (23.4)	−2.0 (28.4)	2.5 (36.5)	7.3 (45.1)	11.4 (52.5)	16.2 (61.2)	18.1 (64.6)	14.4 (57.9)	7.5 (45.5)	2.1 (35.8)	−2.5 (27.5)	5.5 (41.8)
Record low °C (°F)	−15.8 (3.6)	−16.0 (3.2)	−12.2 (10.0)	−8.3 (17.1)	−0.6 (30.9)	3.1 (37.6)	6.0 (42.8)	8.1 (46.6)	3.4 (38.1)	−1.1 (30.0)	−7.0 (19.4)	−11.4 (11.5)	−16.0 (3.2)
Average precipitation mm (inches)	75.2 (2.96)	61.7 (2.43)	71.8 (2.83)	76.5 (3.01)	100.1 (3.94)	112.8 (4.44)	147.0 (5.79)	179.4 (7.06)	172.7 (6.80)	127.0 (5.00)	98.6 (3.88)	90.0 (3.54)	1,317.7 (51.88)
Average precipitation days (≥ 1.0 mm)	14.7	12.9	13.3	10.9	10.9	10.1	11.5	11.5	11.3	12.2	14.4	14.7	148.4
Mean monthly sunshine hours	95.5	117.6	169.9	195.9	200.5	157.3	130.0	145.2	153.4	159.4	113.0	96.3	1,733.9
Source: JMA

== Demographics ==
Per Japanese census data, the population of Higashidōri peaked around the year 1960 and has declined over the past 60 years.

Historical population
Year	Pop.	±%
1920	7,387	—
1930	8,377	+13.4%
1940	9,514	+13.6%
1950	10,761	+13.1%
1960	12,449	+15.7%
1970	10,735	−13.8%
1980	9,975	−7.1%
1990	8,794	−11.8%
2000	7,975	−9.3%
2010	7,252	−9.1%
2020	5,955	−17.9%

== History ==
The area around Higashidōri was inhabited by the Emishi people, with archaeological remains dating to the Jōmon period. During the Edo period, it was controlled by the Nambu clan of Morioka Domain, but was a sparsely populated area with scattered fishing hamlets. With the establishment of the modern municipalities system on 1 April 1889, Higashidōri Village was proclaimed from the merger of twelve small hamlets, although the village administrative center was kept within the town hall of neighboring Tanabu Town (now part of the city of Mutsu). In 1988, to celebrate its 100th anniversary as a village, a village hall was finally built within the borders of Higashidōri.

== Government ==
Higashidōri has a mayor-council form of government with a directly elected mayor and a unicameral village council of 14 members. Higashidōri is part of Shimokita District which, together with the city of Mutsu, contributes three members to the Aomori Prefectural Assembly. In terms of national politics, the village is part of Aomori 1st district of the lower house of the Diet of Japan.

== Economy ==
The economy of Higashidōri was traditionally almost completely dependent on commercial fishing. However, since the 1980s, there has been massive investment from Tōhoku Electric Power Company and Tokyo Electric Power Company towards the construction of the Higashidōri Nuclear Power Plant and related support facilities. In addition, the Iwaya Wind Farm, with a total generation capacity of 32.5 MW, is the largest in Japan.

== Education ==
Higashidōri has one public elementary school and one public middle school operated by the town government. The village does not have a high school.

== Transportation ==
=== Railway ===
Higashidōri has no passenger railway service. The nearest train station is Shimokita Station on the JR East Ōminato Line.

=== Highway ===
- National Route 338

== Local attractions ==
- Cape Shiriya
- Hamashiriya Shell Mound, a National Historic Site
- Sarugamori Sand Dunes
- Shiriyazaki Lighthouse
