= Shiriyazaki Lighthouse =

Shiriyazaki Lighthouse Shiriyazaki tōdai 尻屋埼灯台
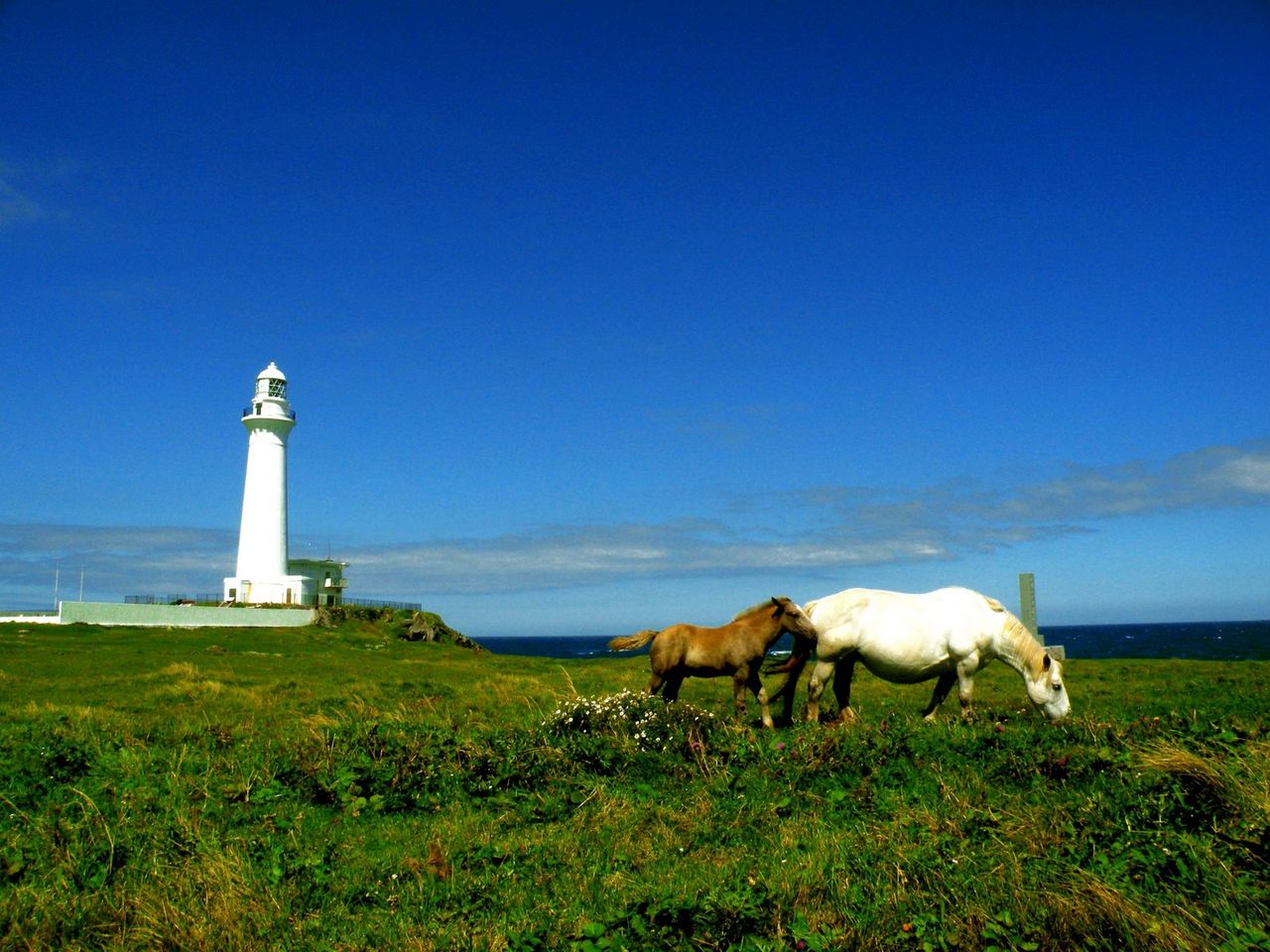
- Shiriyazaki Lighthouse
- Location: Higashidōri; Aomori Prefecture; Japan
- Coordinates: 41°25′49.4″N 141°27′43.6″E

Tower
- Constructed: 1876 (first)
- Foundation: brick and concrete
- Construction: brick and concrete tower
- Height: 32.82 metres (107.7 ft)
- Shape: tapered cylindrical tower with balcony and lantern
- Markings: white tower and lantern

Light
- First lit: 1951 (current)
- Focal height: 45.70 metres (149.9 ft)
- Lens: Second Order Fresnel
- Intensity: 2,000,000 candela
- Range: 34 kilometres (18 nmi)
- Characteristic: Fl W 10s.
- Japan no.: JCG-1604

Shiriyazaki Lighthouse (尻屋埼灯台, Shiriyazaki tōdai) is a lighthouse located on the outermost extremity of Cape Shiriyazaki, the northeasternmost point of Honshu, in Higashidōri, Aomori Prefecture, Japan. It received protection as a Registered Tangible Cultural Property in 2017.

== History ==
Shiriyazaki Lighthouse was one of the 26 lighthouses built in Meiji period Japan by British engineer Richard Henry Brunton. Work began in June 1873. The lighthouse was completed on October 20, 1876 (after Brunton had departed from Japan), and was the first western-style lighthouse in the Tōhoku region. On November 20, 1877, a fog bell was installed due to the high incidence of fog and days of poor visibility in the area. This was the first fog bell in Japan, but the sound proved to be too weak, so on December 20, 1879, it was replaced by the first fog horn in Japan. Other noteworthy events include the installation of the first electric power generator for a lighthouse in Japan in 1901.

In 1945, during World War II, Shiriyazaki Lighthouse was bombarded by United States Navy warships, cracking its Fresnel lens and causing severe damage to its structure, killing its attendant. However, the following year, on several occasions, fishermen reported being able to see a light in the ruined lighthouse, which enabled them to land safely despite a deep fog. However, when authorities investigated, they found that the stairs were blocked with rubble and the light room was completely destroyed. A temporary light was installed in the ruined structure from August 1946, and the rumors ceased. The lighthouse was repaired and went back into operation in 1951. The lighthouse is maintained by the Japan Coast Guard.

The Shiriyazaki Lighthouse is registered with the Japanese government as an "A-grade Lighthouse" for historic preservation and is listed as one of the "50 Lighthouses of Japan" by the Japan Lighthouse Association.

== See also ==
- List of lighthouses in Japan
