= Japan National Route 278 =

National highway in Japan

National Route 278
- 国道278号
- Japan National Route 278 highlighted in red
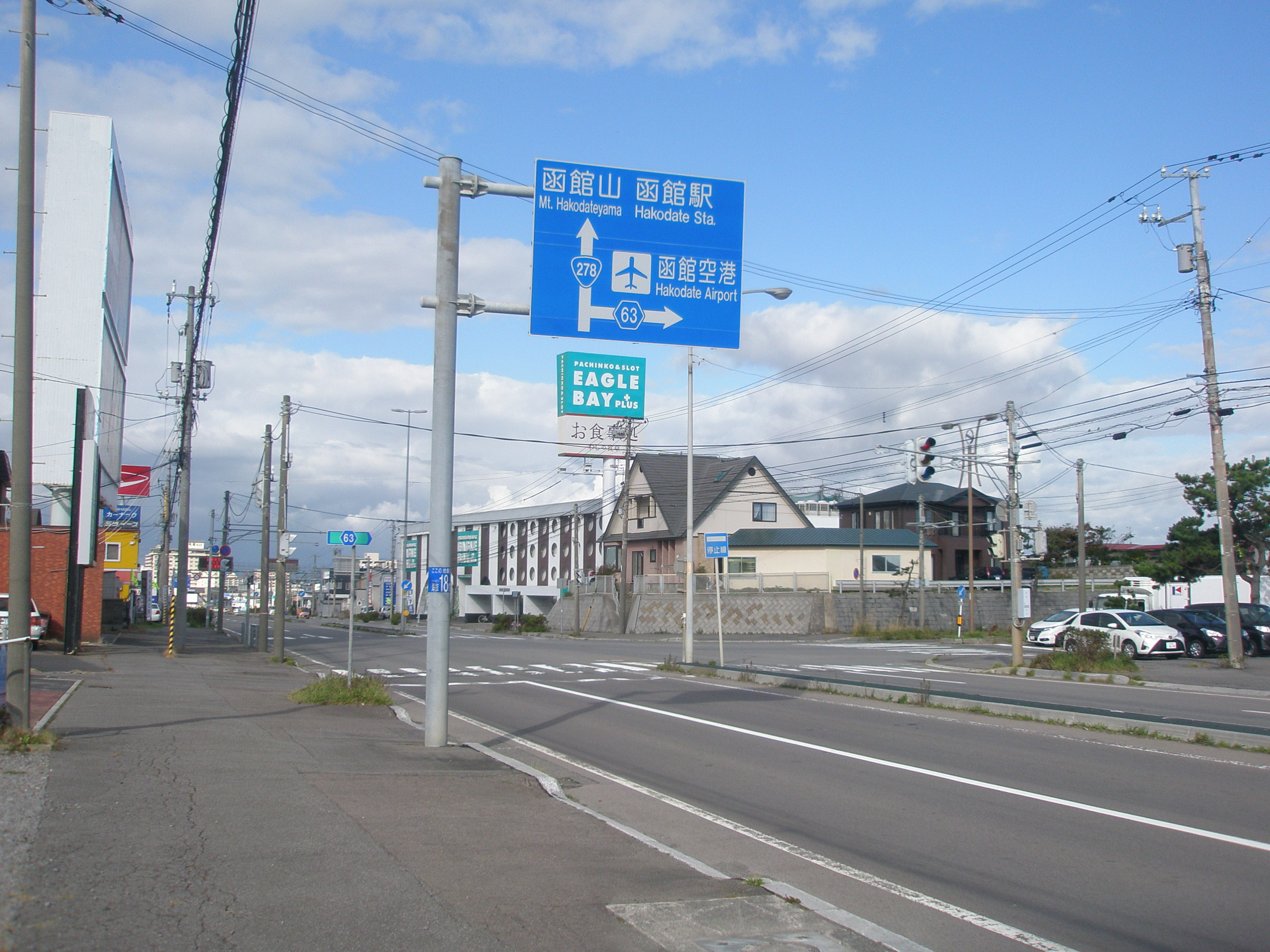

Route information
- Length: 114.3 km (71.0 mi)

Location
- Country: Japan

Highway system
- National highways of Japan; Expressways of Japan
← National Route 277	→ National Route 279

National Route 278 (国道278号, Kokudō Nihyaku nana-juhachigō) is a national highway on the island and prefecture of Hokkaido in northern Japan. The 114.3-kilometer (71.0 mi) highway connects Hakodate and Mori.
