= Rokkasho =

Rokkasho 六ヶ所村
- Village
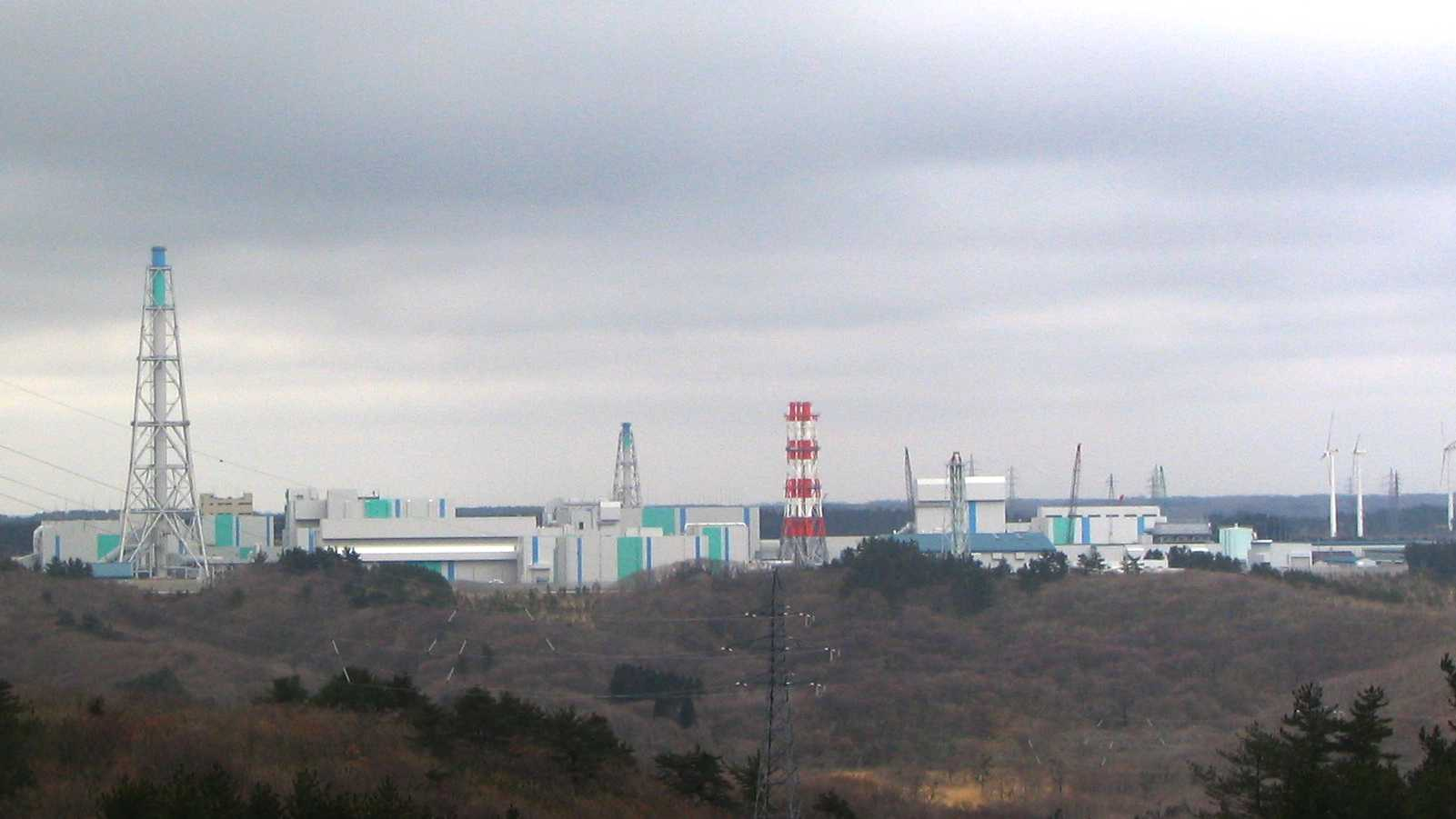
- Rokkasho Nuclear Reprocessing Plant

- Flag Seal
- Location of Rokkasho in Aomori Prefecture

- Coordinates: 40°58′02″N 141°22′28″E
- Country: Japan
- Region: Tōhoku
- Prefecture: Aomori
- District: Kamikita

Area
  - Total: 252.68 km^{2} (97.56 sq mi)

Population (January 1, 2026)
  - Total: 9,559
  - Density: 37.83/km^{2} (97.98/sq mi)
- Time zone: UTC+9 (Japan Standard Time)
- Phone number: 0175-72-2111
- Address: 475 Noduki Obuchi, Rokkasho-mura, Kamikita-gun, Aomori 039-3212
- Climate: Cfb/Dfb
- Website: Official website
- Symbols
- Bird: White-tailed eagle
- Flower: Daylily
- Tree: Japanese black pine

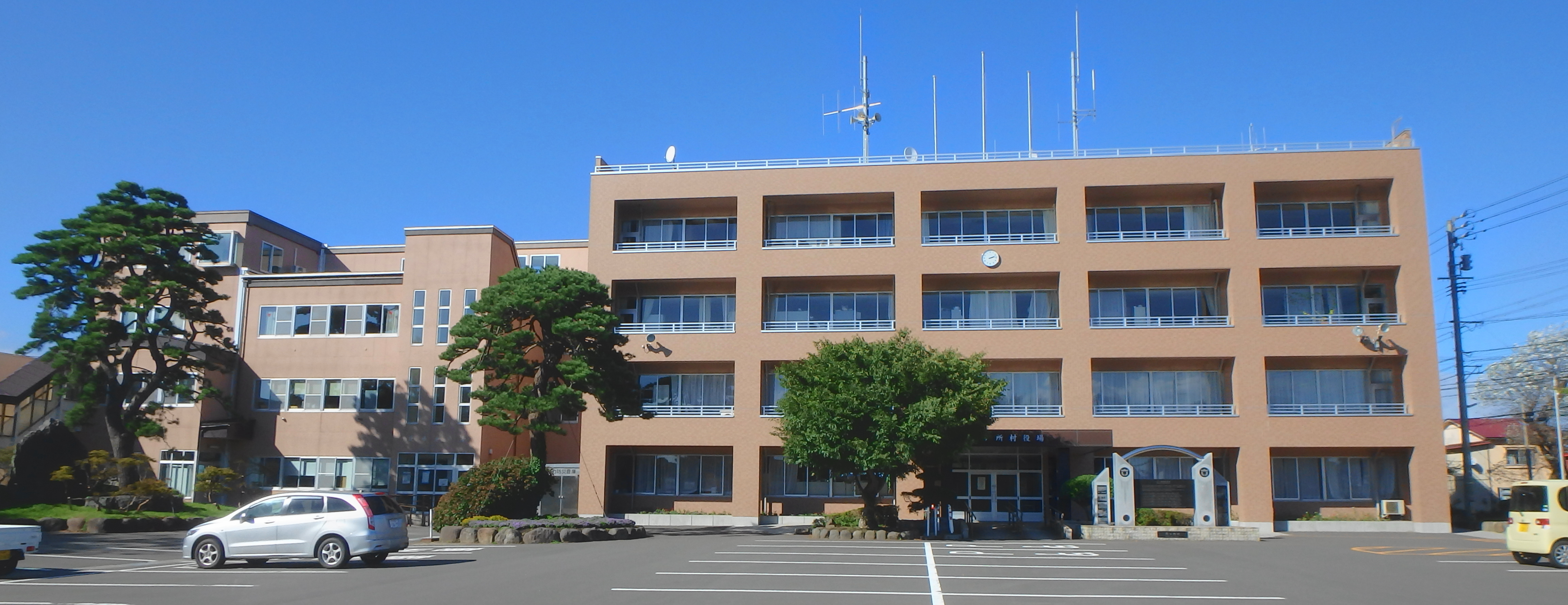
Rokkasho village hall

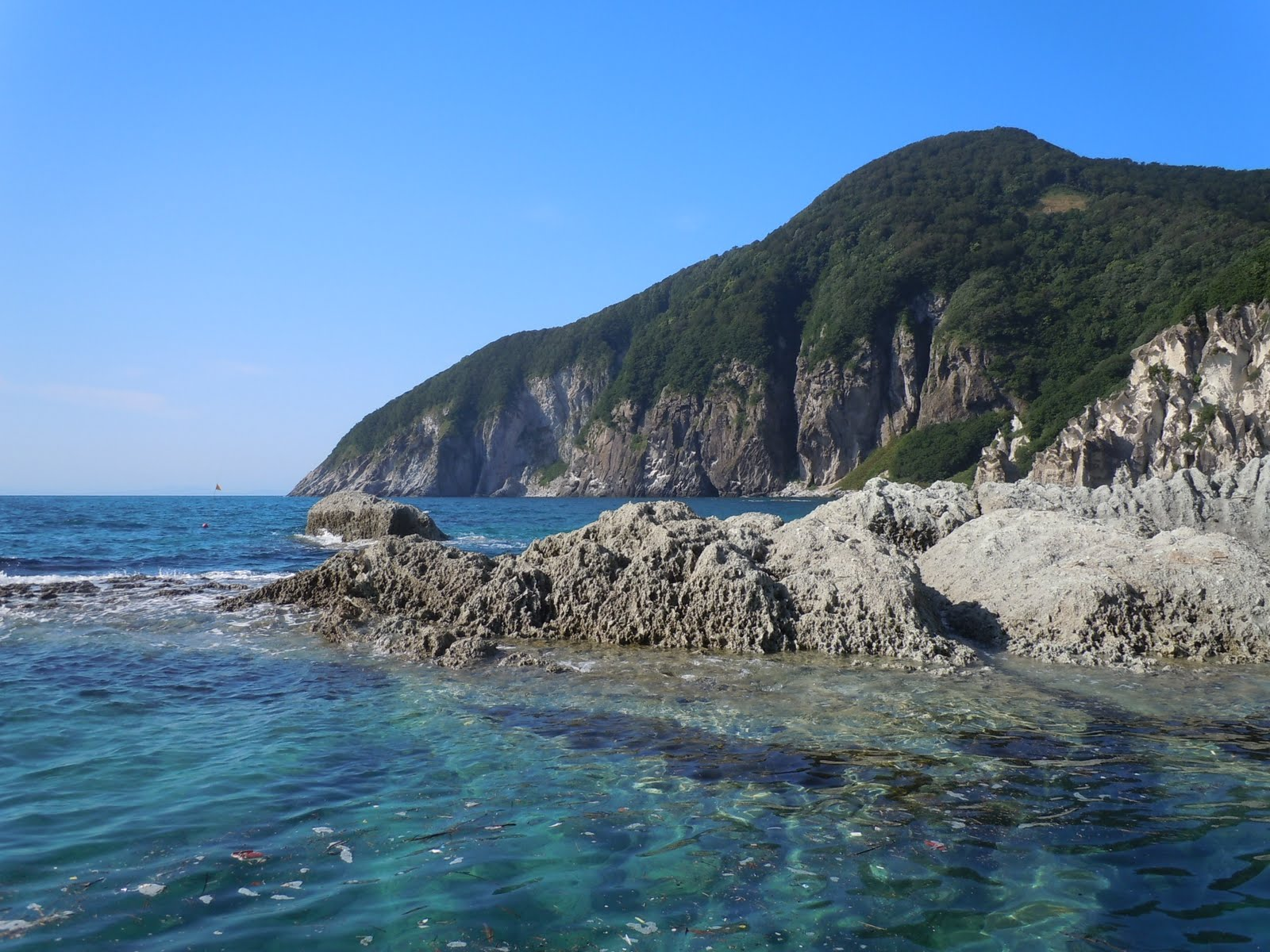
Rokkasho coastline

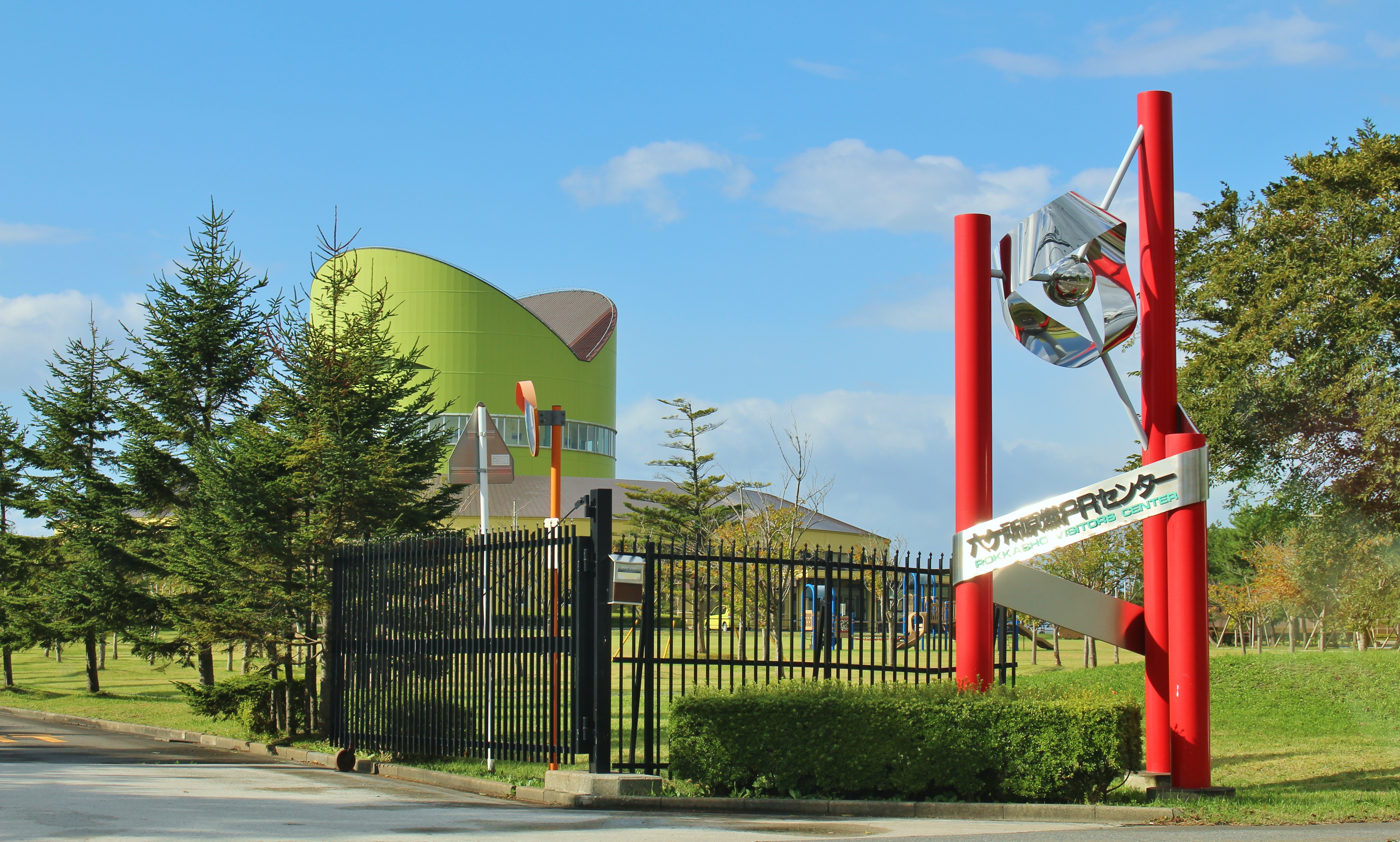
Rokkasho Atomic Energy Visitors Center

Rokkasho (六ヶ所村, Rokkasho-mura) is a village in Aomori Prefecture, Japan. As of 1 January 2026, the village had an estimated population of 9,559 in 5109 households, and a population density of 38 persons per km^{2}. The total area of the village is 252.68 square kilometres (97.56 sq mi).

== Geography ==
Rokkasho occupies the eastern coastline of the base of Shimokita Peninsula, facing the Pacific Ocean to the east. The village forms the northern shoreline of Lake Ogawara.

=== Neighbouring municipalities ===
Aomori Prefecture

- Misawa
- Shimokita District
  - Higashidōri
- Kamikita District
  - Noheji
  - Tōhoku
  - Yokohama

=== Climate ===
The village has a warm summer Humid Continental Climate characterized by cool short summers and long cold winters with heavy snowfall (Köppen climate classification Dfb) bordering on the rare Oceanic Climate (Cfb). The average annual temperature in Rokkasho is 9.4 °C. The average annual rainfall is 1410 mm with August as the wettest month. The temperatures are highest on average in August, at around 21.3 °C, and lowest in January, at around -1.5 °C as per the Japan Meteorological Agency.

Climate data for Rokkasho (1991−2020 normals, extremes 1982−present)
Month	Jan	Feb	Mar	Apr	May	Jun	Jul	Aug	Sep	Oct	Nov	Dec	Year
Record high °C (°F)	10.9 (51.6)	16.6 (61.9)	20.6 (69.1)	29.1 (84.4)	30.3 (86.5)	34.1 (93.4)	34.2 (93.6)	34.4 (93.9)	33.7 (92.7)	28.6 (83.5)	23.7 (74.7)	18.2 (64.8)	34.4 (93.9)
Mean daily maximum °C (°F)	1.2 (34.2)	1.9 (35.4)	5.7 (42.3)	12.3 (54.1)	17.2 (63.0)	19.9 (67.8)	23.4 (74.1)	25.3 (77.5)	22.7 (72.9)	17.2 (63.0)	10.5 (50.9)	3.8 (38.8)	13.4 (56.2)
Daily mean °C (°F)	−1.5 (29.3)	−1.2 (29.8)	1.9 (35.4)	7.3 (45.1)	12.1 (53.8)	15.4 (59.7)	19.4 (66.9)	21.3 (70.3)	18.4 (65.1)	12.6 (54.7)	6.5 (43.7)	0.8 (33.4)	9.4 (48.9)
Mean daily minimum °C (°F)	−4.4 (24.1)	−4.4 (24.1)	−1.9 (28.6)	2.8 (37.0)	7.9 (46.2)	12.0 (53.6)	16.5 (61.7)	18.3 (64.9)	14.8 (58.6)	8.2 (46.8)	2.6 (36.7)	−2.2 (28.0)	5.8 (42.5)
Record low °C (°F)	−12.1 (10.2)	−12.6 (9.3)	−10.9 (12.4)	−5.3 (22.5)	0.5 (32.9)	3.7 (38.7)	8.9 (48.0)	9.8 (49.6)	4.8 (40.6)	−0.8 (30.6)	−7.8 (18.0)	−11.8 (10.8)	−12.6 (9.3)
Average precipitation mm (inches)	106.4 (4.19)	81.0 (3.19)	74.2 (2.92)	68.4 (2.69)	93.8 (3.69)	108.4 (4.27)	151.4 (5.96)	176.8 (6.96)	169.8 (6.69)	130.6 (5.14)	105.0 (4.13)	125.4 (4.94)	1,410.6 (55.54)
Average precipitation days (≥ 1.0 mm)	19.6	15.9	13.5	10.6	10.8	10.1	12.2	12.4	11.7	12.4	15.2	19.3	163.7
Mean monthly sunshine hours	70.7	90.8	159.4	194.6	201.4	161.3	131.9	149.7	158.1	158.6	106.3	70.2	1,645.6
Source: Japan Meteorological Agency

== Demographics ==
Per Japanese census data, the population of Rokkasho has remained relatively stable over the past 70 years.

Historical population

Year	Pop.	±%
1920	5,802	—
1930	6,554	+13.0%
1940	7,977	+21.7%
1950	10,702	+34.2%
1960	13,523	+26.4%
1970	11,749	−13.1%

Year	Pop.	±%
1980	11,104	−5.5%
1990	10,071	−9.3%
2000	11,849	+17.7%
2010	11,095	−6.4%
2020	10,367	−6.6%

== History ==
The area around Rokkasho was known for raising horses during the Kamakura period. During the Edo period, it was controlled by the Nanbu clan of Morioka Domain, becoming part of the territories of Shichinohe Domain in the latter half of the Edo period. With the establishment of the modern municipalities system after the start of the Meiji period, on April 1, 1889, the village of Rokkasho was created following the merger of six small hamlets.

== Government ==
Rokkasho has a mayor-council form of government with a directly elected mayor and a unicameral village council of 18 members. Rokkasho is part of Kamikita District which contributes four members to the Aomori Prefectural Assembly. In terms of national politics, the village is part of Aomori 2nd district of the lower house of the Diet of Japan.

== Economy ==
The economy of Rokkasho has traditionally been dependent on agriculture and commercial fishing. From the 1980s onwards, the village has become a center for various energy developments, which now dominate the local economy. Rokkasho's per capita income was $129,676 (1557,8000 Yen $1= 120.13 Yen )

=== Nuclear industry and research ===
Nuclear fuel cycle related facilities:

- Japan Nuclear Fuel Limited headquarters
- The Rokkasho Reprocessing Plant (currently under test operation)
- A uranium enrichment plant and plutonium reprocessing plant.
- A MOX fuel fabrication facility with an 800-ton per year capacity when completed
- A low level nuclear waste storage facility
- A high level nuclear waste temporary storage and monitoring facility

The Japan Atomic Energy Agency also has multiple facilities at the site like the Linear IFMIF Prototype Accelerator (LIPAc) devoted to the Fusion Energy Development Programme under the European Union-Japan Broader Approach agreement.

Since the 1970s, local opposition to plans to operate Japan's first large commercial plutonium plant at Rokkasho have focused on the threat of a large-scale release of radioactivity. During the 1990s anti-nuclear groups in Japan released studies showing the risks of routine operation of the Rokkasho Reprocessing Plant. The facility in full operation is designed to separate as much as 8 tons of plutonium each year from spent reactor fuel from Japan's domestic nuclear reactors. As of 2006 Japan owned approximately 45 tons of separated plutonium.

In May, 2006, an international awareness campaign about the dangers of the Rokkasho reprocessing plant, Stop Rokkasho, was launched by musician Ryuichi Sakamoto. Greenpeace has opposed operation of the Rokkasho Reprocessing Plant under a campaign called "Wings of Peace: No more Hiroshima, Nagasaki. Stop Rokkasho" since 2002 and has launched a cyberaction to stop the project.

Rokkasho was a candidate to host the plasma fusion reactor ITER, but lost out to Cadarache, France. Rokkasho has been hosting the Helios high-performance supercomputer centre capable of performing complex plasma physics calculations for fusion research, since January 2012.

=== Gas and wind power ===
- Mutsu-Ogawara Oil Storage Facility
  - Completed: September 1985
  - Max capacity: around 5,700 megaliters in 51 tanks
  - Current usage: 4,920 megaliters at end of March 2003
  - Managing company：Mutsu-Ogawara Oil Storage Co Ltd
- Mutsu-Ogawara Wind Farm
  - Established: January 2003
  - Power: 31,500 kW (1,500 kW × 21 units)
  - Managing company: Eco power
- Rokkashomura Futamata Wind Power Plant
  - Established: December 2003
  - Power: 31,850 kW (1,500 kW × 20 units; 1,425 KW x 2 units)
  - Managing company: Japan Wind Development Company Ltd
- Rokkashomura Wind Power Plant
  - Established: May 2007
  - Power: 51,000 kW (1,500 kW × 34 units)
  - Managing company: Japan Wind Development Company Ltd
- Battery energy storage facility
  - 34 MW (204 MWh) grid energy storage facility using sodium–sulfur batteries, manufactured by NGK, installed since 2008

=== Agriculture ===
Stock raising is prevalent.

=== Fishing ===
Three small fishing ports.

== Education ==
Rokkasho has four public elementary schools and three public middle schools operated by the village government and one public high school operated by the Aomori Prefectural Board of Education.

== Transportation ==
=== Railway ===
- Rokkasho is not served by any passenger train service. The closest train station is either Noheji Station or Otomo Station on the Aomori Railway or Fukikoshi Station on the Ōminato Line

=== Highway ===
- Shimokita Expressway
- National Route 338
- National Route 394

=== Seaports ===
- Port of Mutsu-Ogawa

== International relations ==
Waren, Mecklenburg-Vorpommern, Germany, sister city since 1994.

== Local attractions ==
- Rokkasho Prefectural History Museum
- Rokkasho Atomic Energy Visitors Center

== In popular media ==
A documentary, Rokkasho Rhapsody, came out in 2006, which portrays the Rokkasho community's views on the nuclear reprocessing plant.
