= Cape Shiriya =

Headland on the island of Honshu in Japan

Cape Shiriya 尻屋崎
- Cape
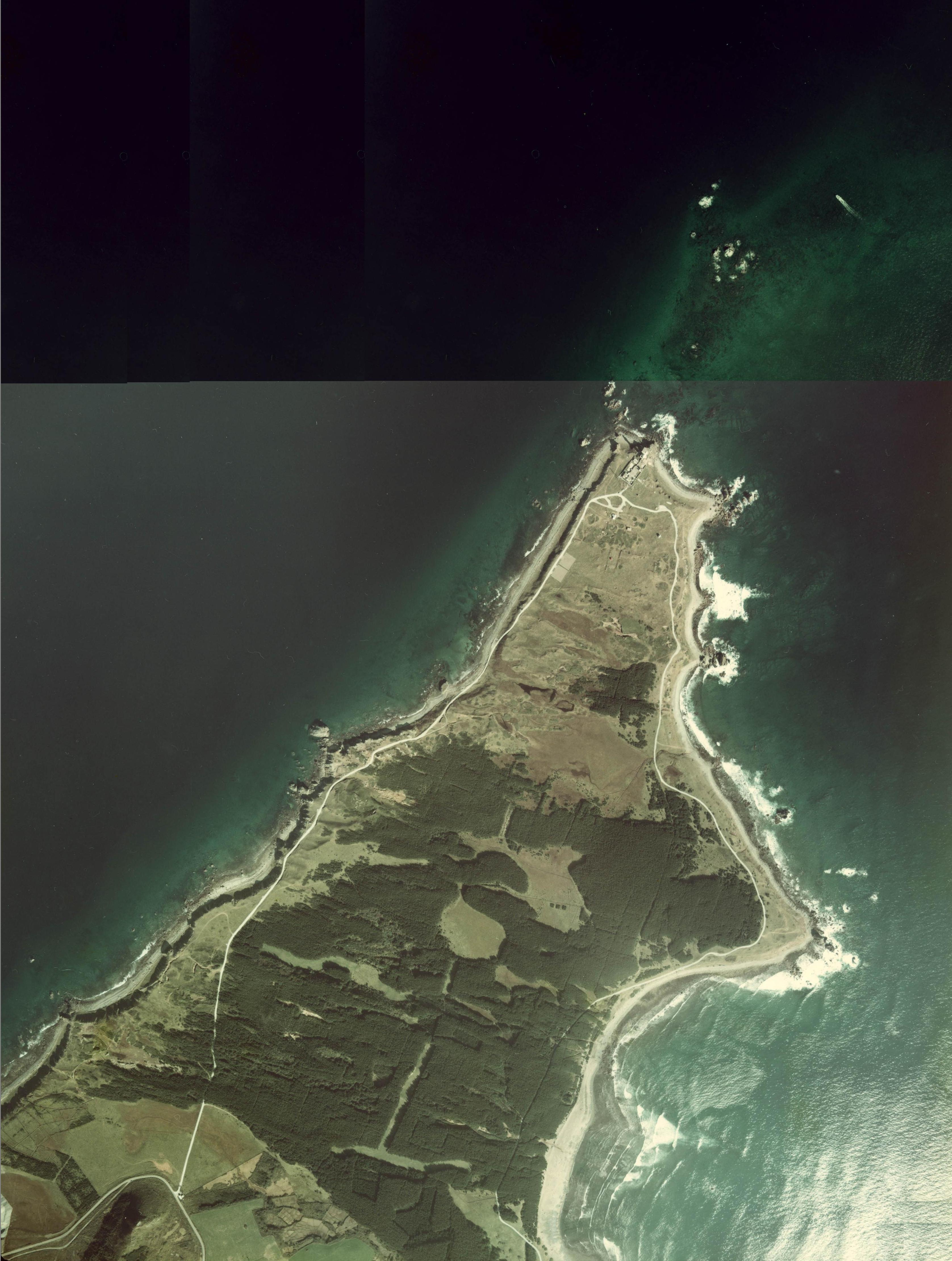
- Aerial Photo of Shiriyazaki in 2010

- Location of Shiriyazaki in Aomori Prefecture Cape Shiriya (Japan)
- Coordinates: 41°25′50″N 141°27′44″E
- Location: Higashidōri, Aomori, Japan

Cape Shiriya (尻屋崎, Shiriyazaki) is a headland on the northeastern point of the island of Honshu in Japan. It is located within the borders of the town of Higashidōri, Aomori in northern Shimokita Peninsula, and is part of the Shimokita Hantō Quasi-National Park. The cape is on the border of Tsugaru Strait separating Honshu from Hokkaido, and the Pacific Ocean.

Shiriyazaki Lighthouse is located on Cape Shiriya. The area is also noted for Kandachime (寒立馬), a breed of semi-feral horse noted for sturdiness in cold weather.

== See also ==
- Hamashiriya Shell Mound
