= Kazamaura =

Kazamaura 風間浦村
- Village
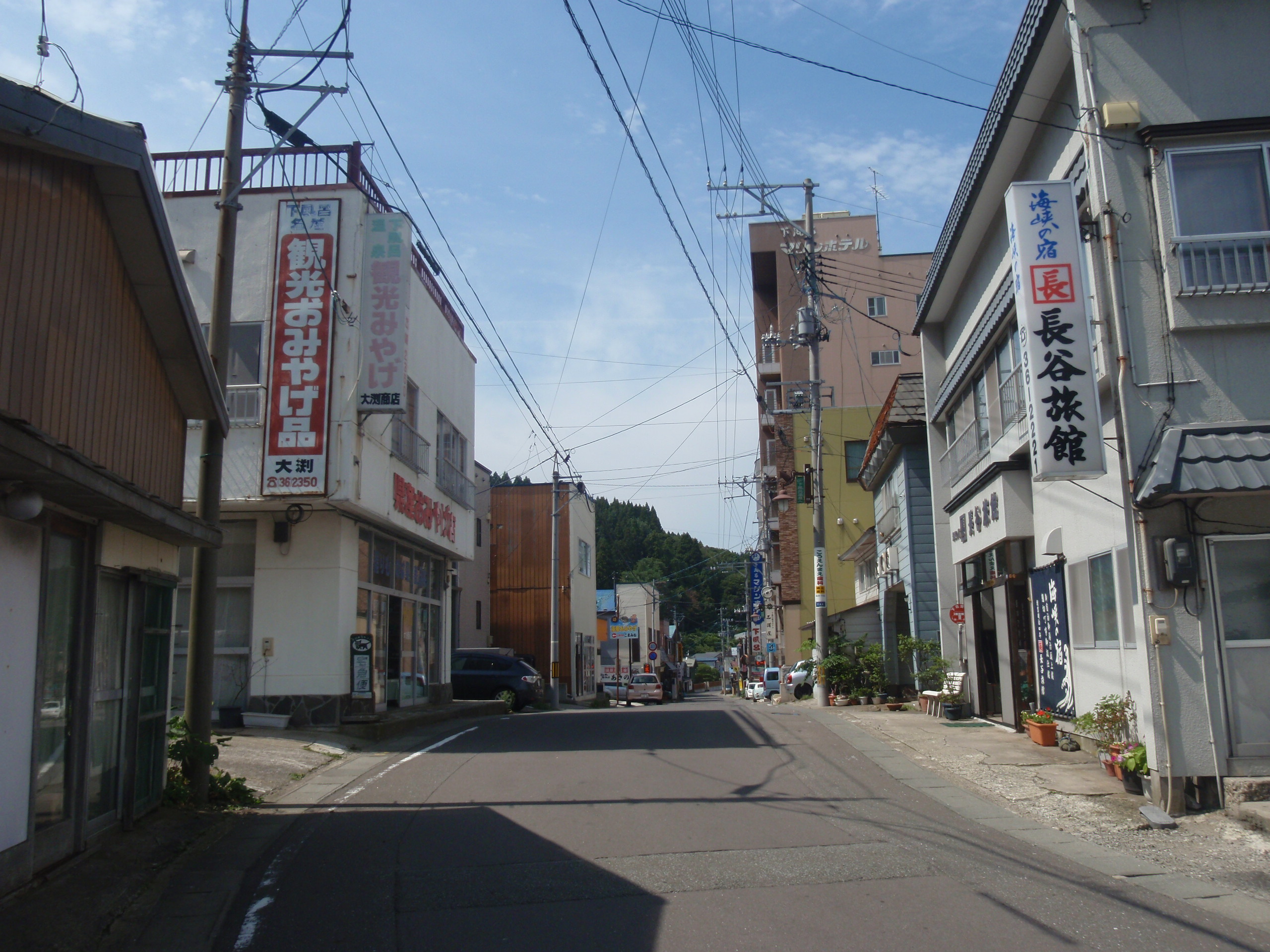
- Shimoburo onsen in Kazamaura

- Flag Seal
- Interactive map of Kazamaura
- Coordinates: 41°29′15″N 140°59′55″E
- Country: Japan
- Region: Tōhoku
- Prefecture: Aomori
- District: Shimokita

Area
  - Total: 69.466 km^{2} (26.821 sq mi)

Population (December 31, 2025)
  - Total: 1,491
  - Density: 21.46/km^{2} (55.59/sq mi)
- Time zone: UTC+9 (Japan Standard Time)
- Phone number: 0175-35-2111
- Address: 28-5 Aza-Ōkawame, Ōaza Ikokuma, Kazamaura-mura, Aomori-ken 039-4502
- Website: Official website
- Symbols
- Bird: Common gull
- Flower: Rosa rugosa
- Tree: Hiba

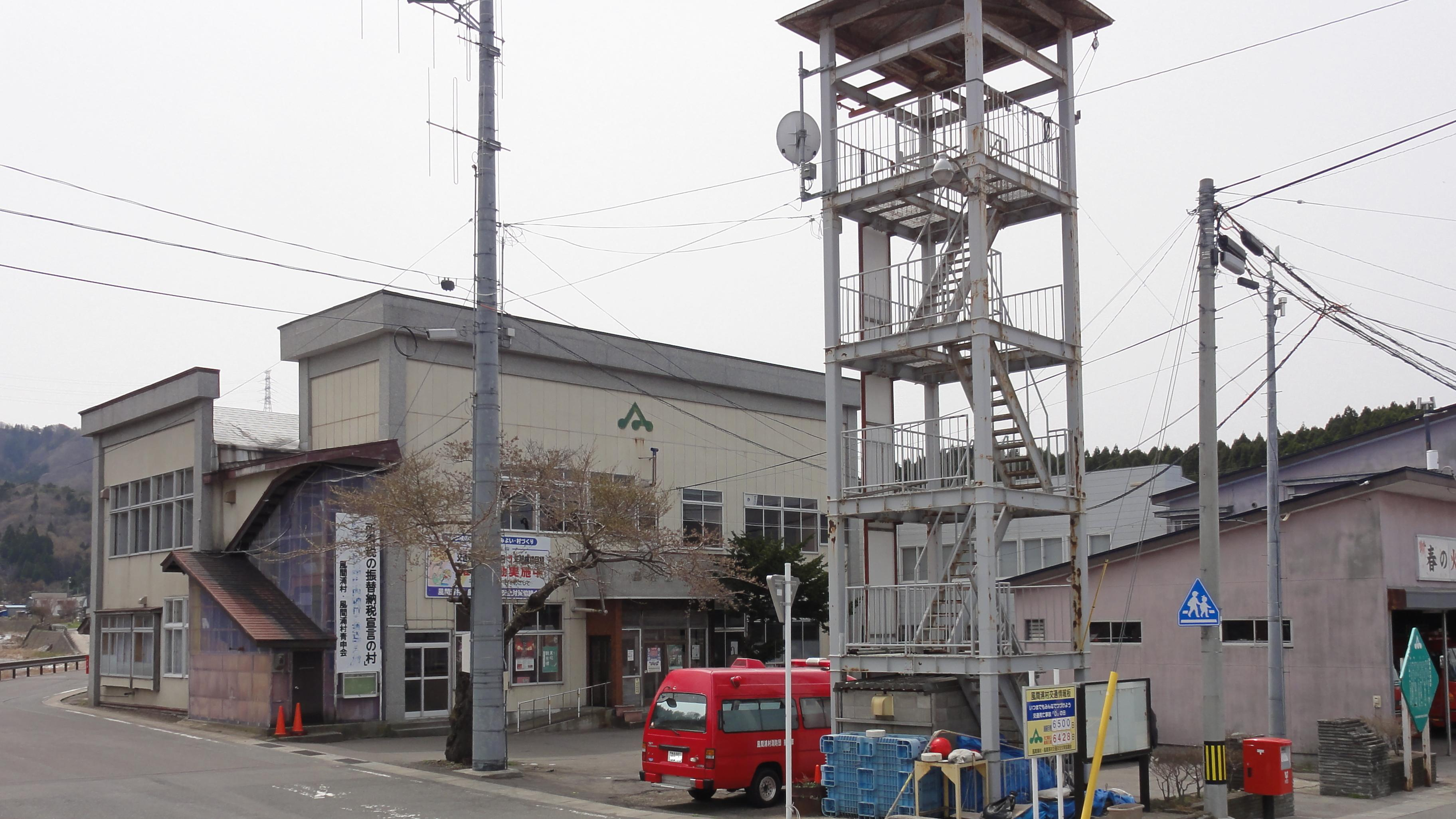
Kazamaura Village Hall

Kazamaura (風間浦村, Kazamaura-mura) is a village located in Aomori Prefecture, Japan. As of 31 December 2025, the village had an estimated population of 1,491 in 825 households, and a population density of 22 persons per km^{2}. The total area of the village is 69.46 square kilometres (26.82 sq mi).

== Geography ==
The northernmost municipality on Honshū island, Kazamaura is on the northwestern shore of Shimokita Peninsula. It is separated from the island of Hokkaidō by the Tsugaru Strait. Most of the village is part of the Osoreyama Mountain Range, resulting in little flat land. The Ikokuma River flows through the village. Approximately 96% of the total area of the village is covered by forests. Much of the village is within the borders of the Shimokita Hantō Quasi-National Park.

=== Neighboring municipalities ===
Aomori Prefecture

- Mutsu
- Ōma

=== Climate ===
The village has a cold oceanic climate characterized by cool short summers and long cold winters with heavy snowfall and strong winds. (Köppen climate classification Cfb). The average annual temperature in Kazamaura is 8.7 °C. The average annual rainfall is 1259 mm with September as the wettest month. The temperatures are highest on average in August, at around 21.5 °C, and lowest in January, at around -2.9 °C.

== Demographics ==
Per Japanese census data, the population of Kazamaura has declined over the past 60 years, and is now half of what it was a century ago.

Historical population
Year	Pop.	±%
1920	3,679	—
1930	4,346	+18.1%
1940	4,237	−2.5%
1950	4,775	+12.7%
1960	4,945	+3.6%
1970	4,243	−14.2%
1980	3,917	−7.7%
1990	3,295	−15.9%
2000	2,793	−15.2%
2010	2,465	−11.7%
2020	1,833	−25.6%

== History ==
Kazamaura was founded with the establishment of the modern municipalities system on April 1, 1889, through the merger of the three hamlets of Shimofuro (下風呂村), Ikokuma (易国間), and Hebiurakani (蛇浦簡易), with the new village taking one kanji from the names of its components to form "Kazamaura".

In August 2021, most of a bridge over the Koaka River on the northern edge of Mutsu was washed away during Tropical Storm Lupit. No people were harmed as a result of the bridge collapse; however, it cut off direct highway access to Mutsu for the residents of Ōma and Kazamaura until a signalized one-lane bridge was built on 20 June 2022 to the south of the original to partially restore the connection.

== Government ==
Kazamaura has a mayor-council form of government with a directly elected mayor and a unicameral village council of eight members. Kazamaura is part of Shimokita District which, together with the city of Mutsu, contributes three members to the Aomori Prefectural Assembly. In terms of national politics, the village is part of Aomori 1st district of the lower house of the Diet of Japan.

== Economy ==
The economy of Kazamaura is heavily dependent on forestry and commercial fishing (particularly for squid, sea urchin and konbu).

== Education ==
Kazamaura has one public elementary school, and one public middle school operated by the village government. The village does not have a high school.

== Transportation ==
=== Railway ===
The village has no passenger railway service. The nearest train station is Shimokita Station on the JR East Ōminato Line.

=== Highway ===
- National Route 279

== Local attractions ==
- Shimofuro Onsen - A sulphur hot spring resort known for its view of the many fishing boat lights that shine on the Tsugaru Strait after sunset.
- Kuwabata Onsen,- a hot spring resort
- Isaribi Strait Park
- Squid Centre - A center for supplying fresh squid
- Ikokuma River - A mountain river noted for its scenic foliage season and fishing.
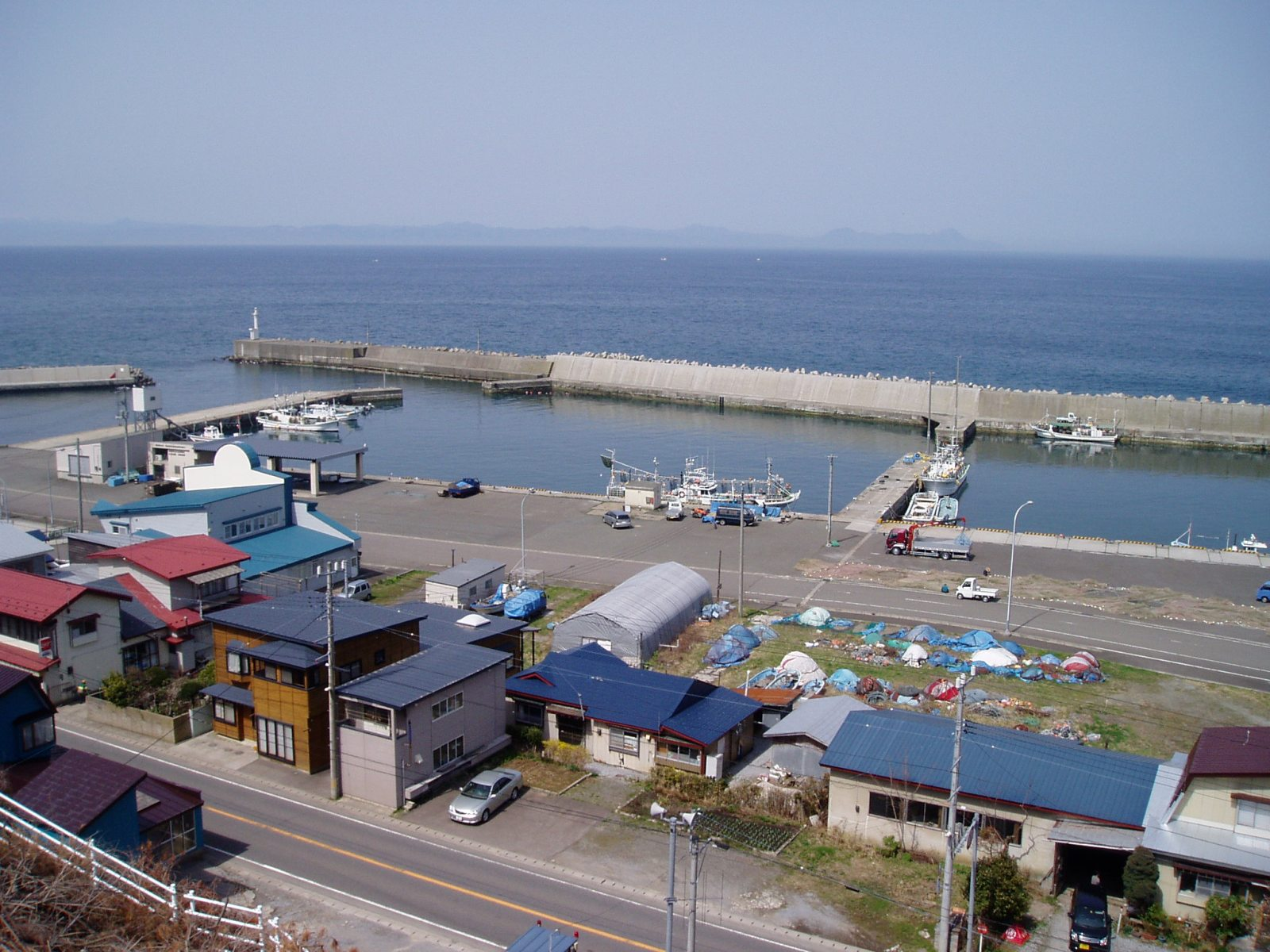
Ikokuma fishing port

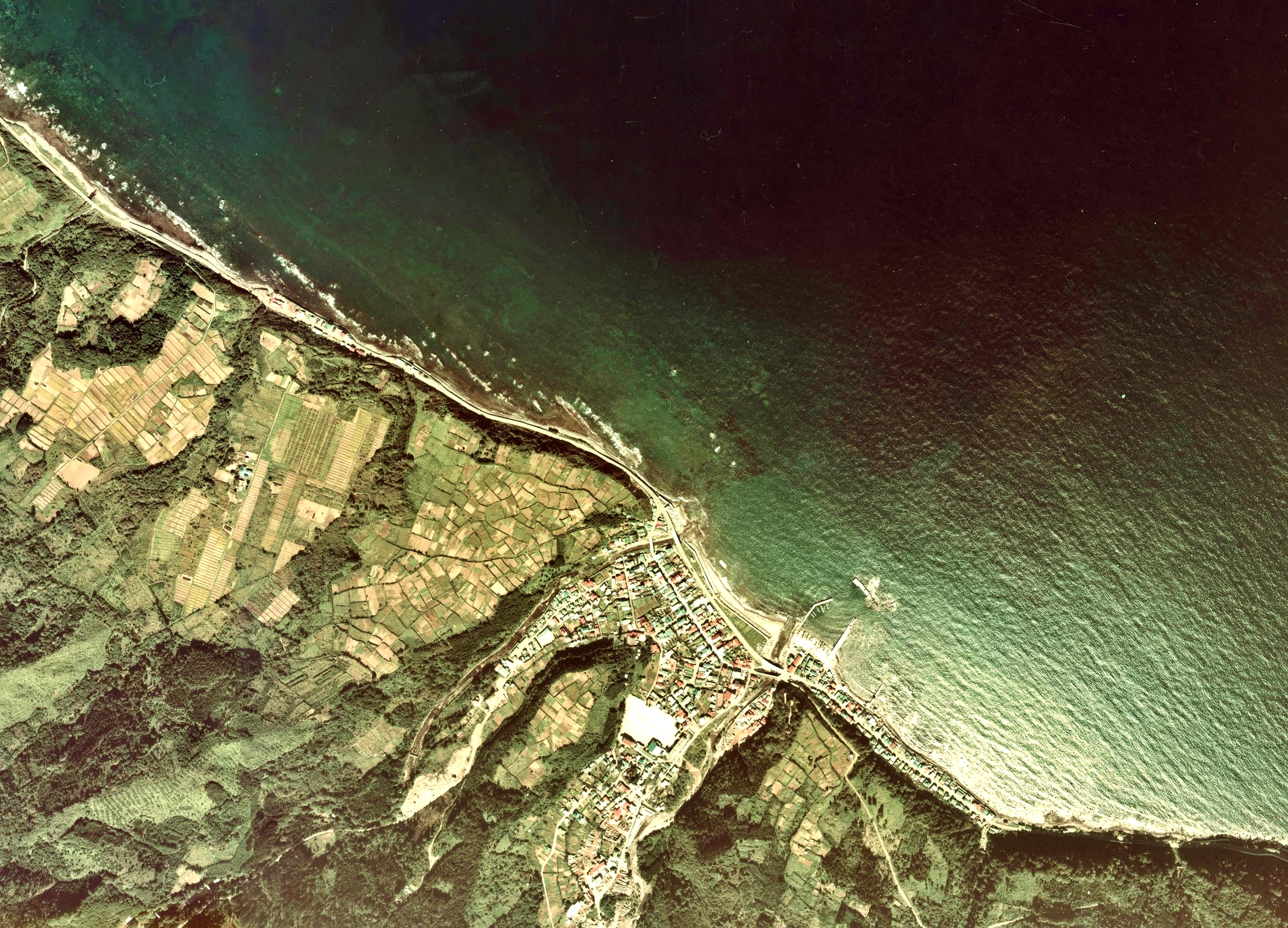
Kazamaura village center area Aerial photograph.1975

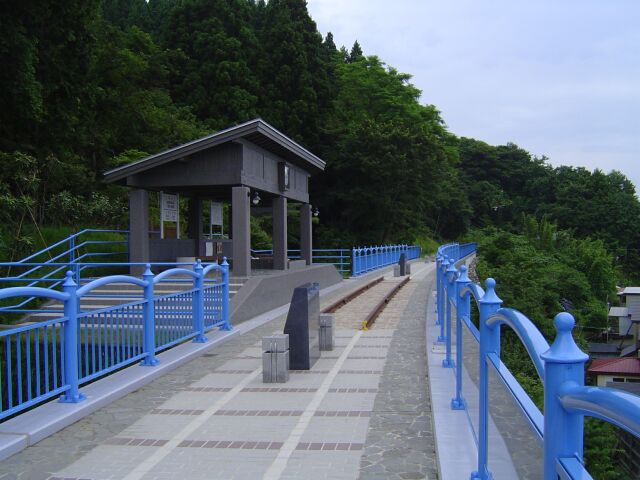
Shimofuro Onsen

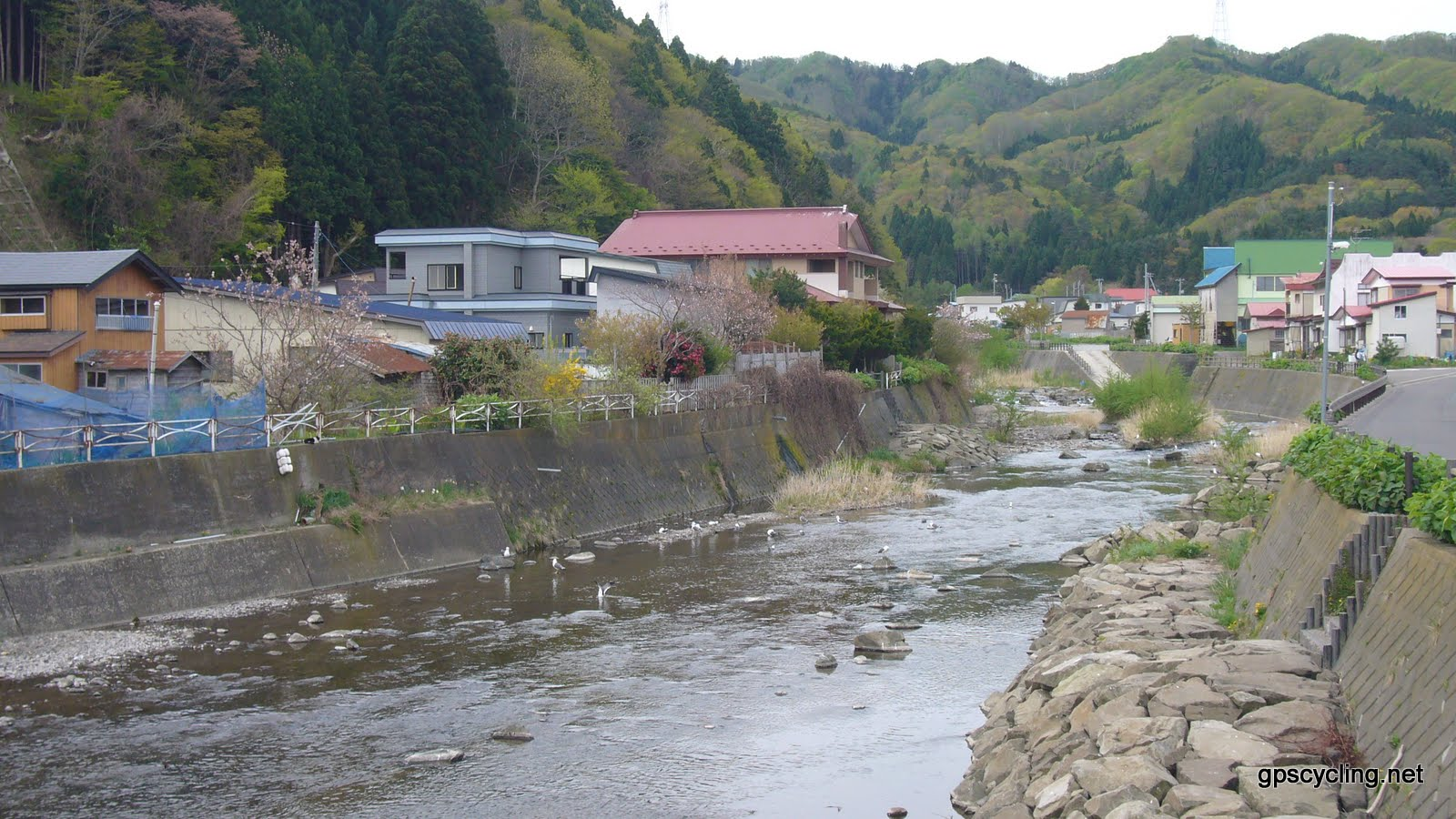
Kazamaura panorama
