= Ōhata River =

- Location within Japan
- Native name: 大畑川 (Japanese)

Location
- Country: Japan
- Region: Tōhoku

Physical characteristics
- Mouth
  - location: Mutsu, Aomori
  - coordinates: 41°24′43″N 141°10′2″E

The Ōhata River (大畑川, Ōhata-gawa) is a river located in Aomori Prefecture, in the Tōhoku region of northern Japan.
