= Lake Usori =

Crater lake on the island of Honshu, Japan

- 宇曽利湖 (Japanese)
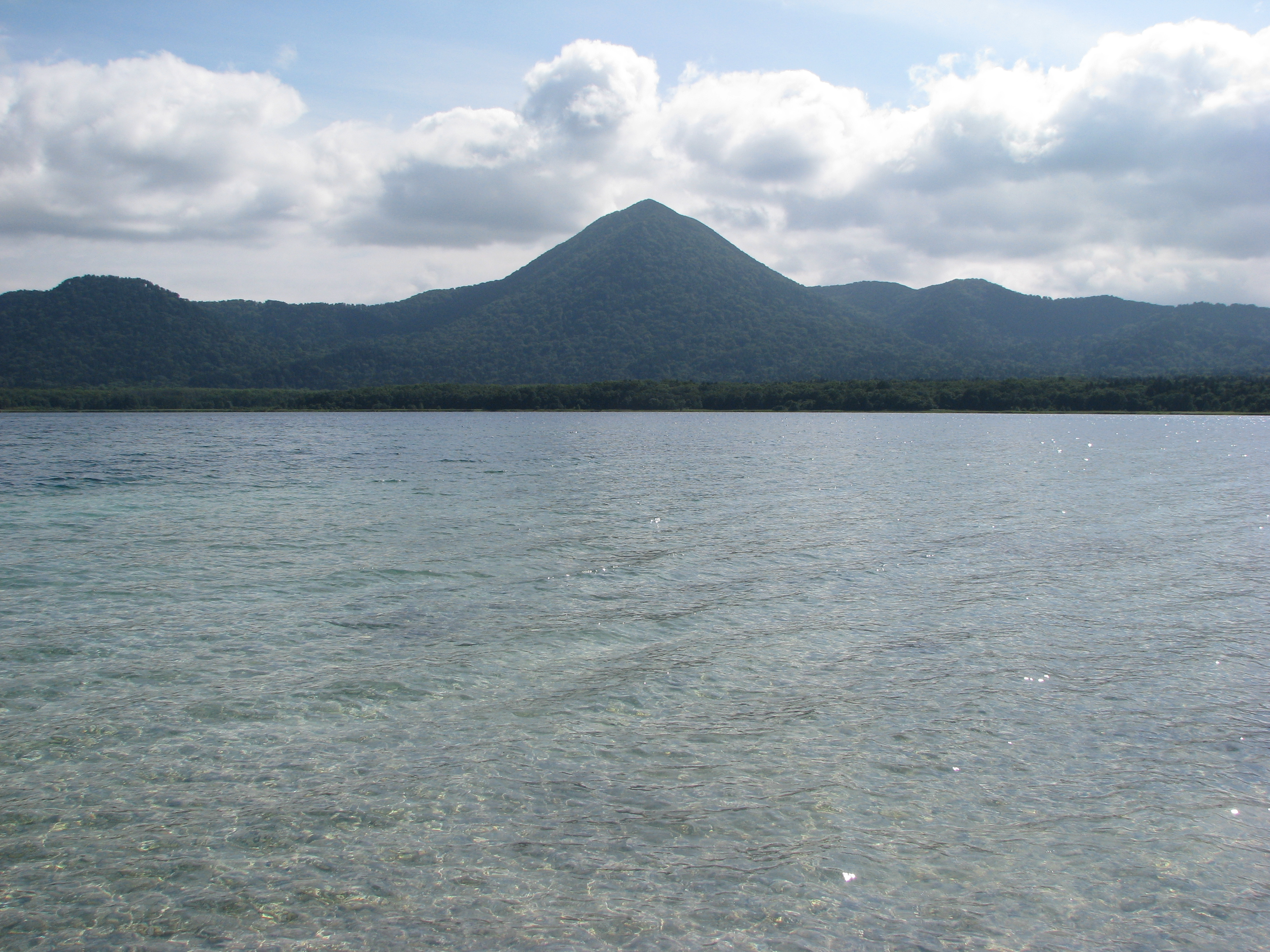

- Location within Aomori Prefecture Location within Japan
- Location: Honshū, Japan
- Coordinates: 41°19′00″N 141°05′20″E
- Type: volcanic crater lake
- Primary outflows: Shotsu River
- Basin countries: Japan
- Surface area: 2.68 km^{2} (1.03 sq mi)
- Max. depth: 23.5 m (77 ft)
- Shore length^{1}: 7.1 km (4.4 mi)
- Surface elevation: 209 metres (686 ft)
- ^{1} Shore length is not a well-defined measure.

Lake Usori (宇曽利湖, Usori-ko) is a volcanic crater lake in northern Honshū island, Japan. It is also referred to as Lake Usorisan (宇曽利山湖, Usorizan-ko). Located in the Shimokita Peninsula of Aomori Prefecture, it is within the borders of the city of Mutsu and Shimokita Hanto Quasi-National Park.

Lake Usori is located in the volcanic Osorezan Mountains, of which the famed Mount Osore forms one portion. From the surrounding caldera walls, some ten streams drain into Lake Usori, but there is only one outlet, the 13.85 kilometer Shotsu River, which drains into the Tsugaru Strait.

The lake is noted for the extreme acidity of its water, with an average pH of around 3.4 to 3.8. Geologists attribute this to hydrogen sulfide seeping from the caldera bottom, forming sulfuric acid in the lake water. Due to its acidity, the lake is home to only one subspecies of Japanese dace, along with several insect species. However, the lake is a noted spot for waterfowl.

== See also ==
- List of lakes in Japan
- List of volcanoes in Japan
