= Mutsu, Aomori =

Mutsu むつ市
- City
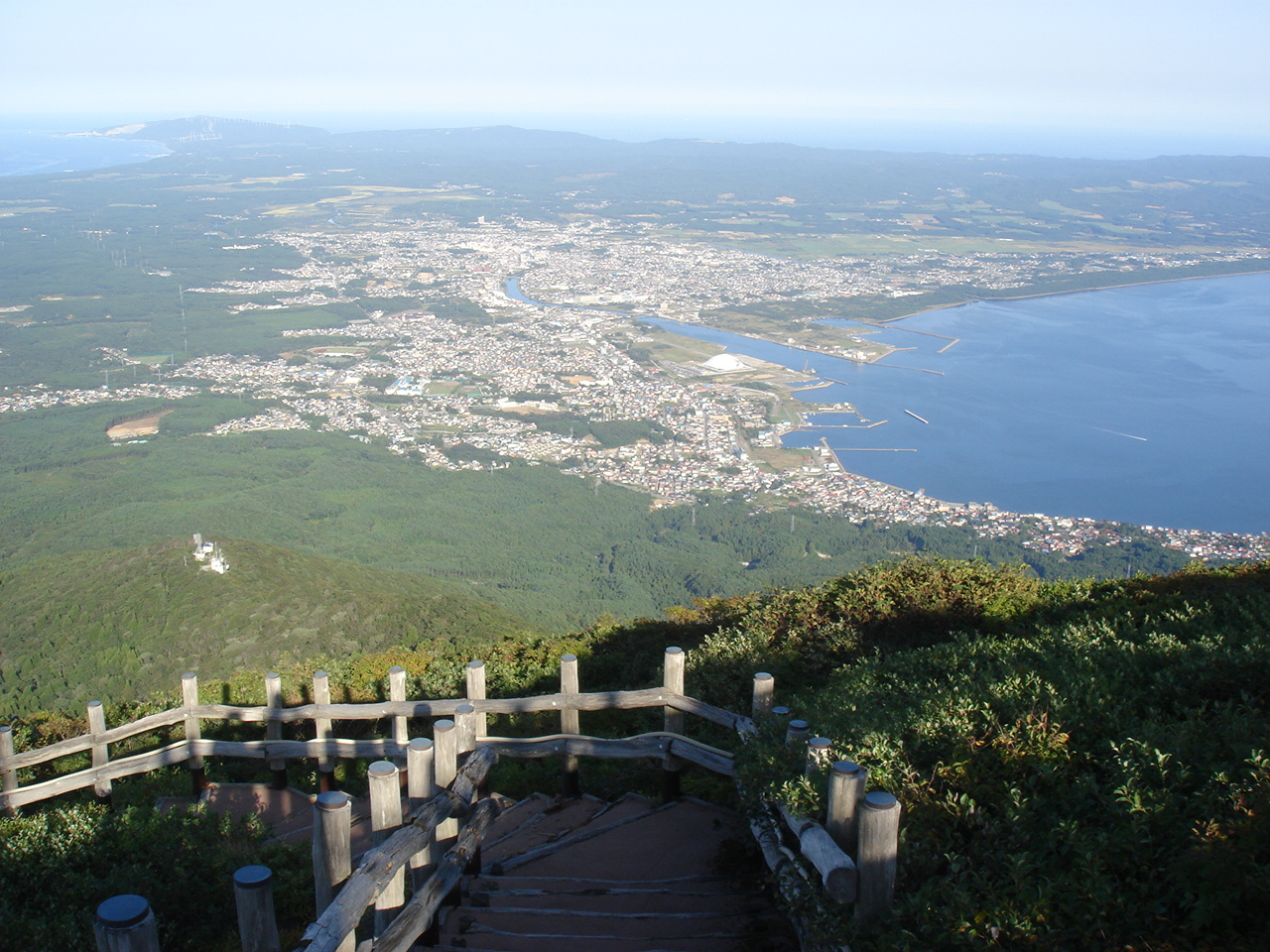
- Mutsu City from Kamafuse-yama

- Flag Seal
- Location of Mutsu in Aomori Prefecture

- Coordinates: 41°17′34″N 141°11′1″E
- Country: Japan
- Region: Tōhoku
- Prefecture: Aomori
- Ōminato-tanabu: September 1, 1959
- Mutsu: August 1, 1960

Government
  - Mayor: Tomoya Yamamoto (since March 2023)

Area
  - Total: 864.20 km^{2} (333.67 sq mi)

Population (November 30, 2025)
  - Total: 50,589
  - Density: 58.539/km^{2} (151.61/sq mi)
- Time zone: UTC+9 (Japan Standard Time)
- Phone number: 0175-22-1111
- Address: 1-1-1, Kanaya, Mutsu-shi, Aomori-ken 035-8686
- Climate: Cfb/Dfb
- Website: Official website
- Symbols
- Bird: Whooper swan
- Flower: Rosa rugosa
- Tree: Asunaro

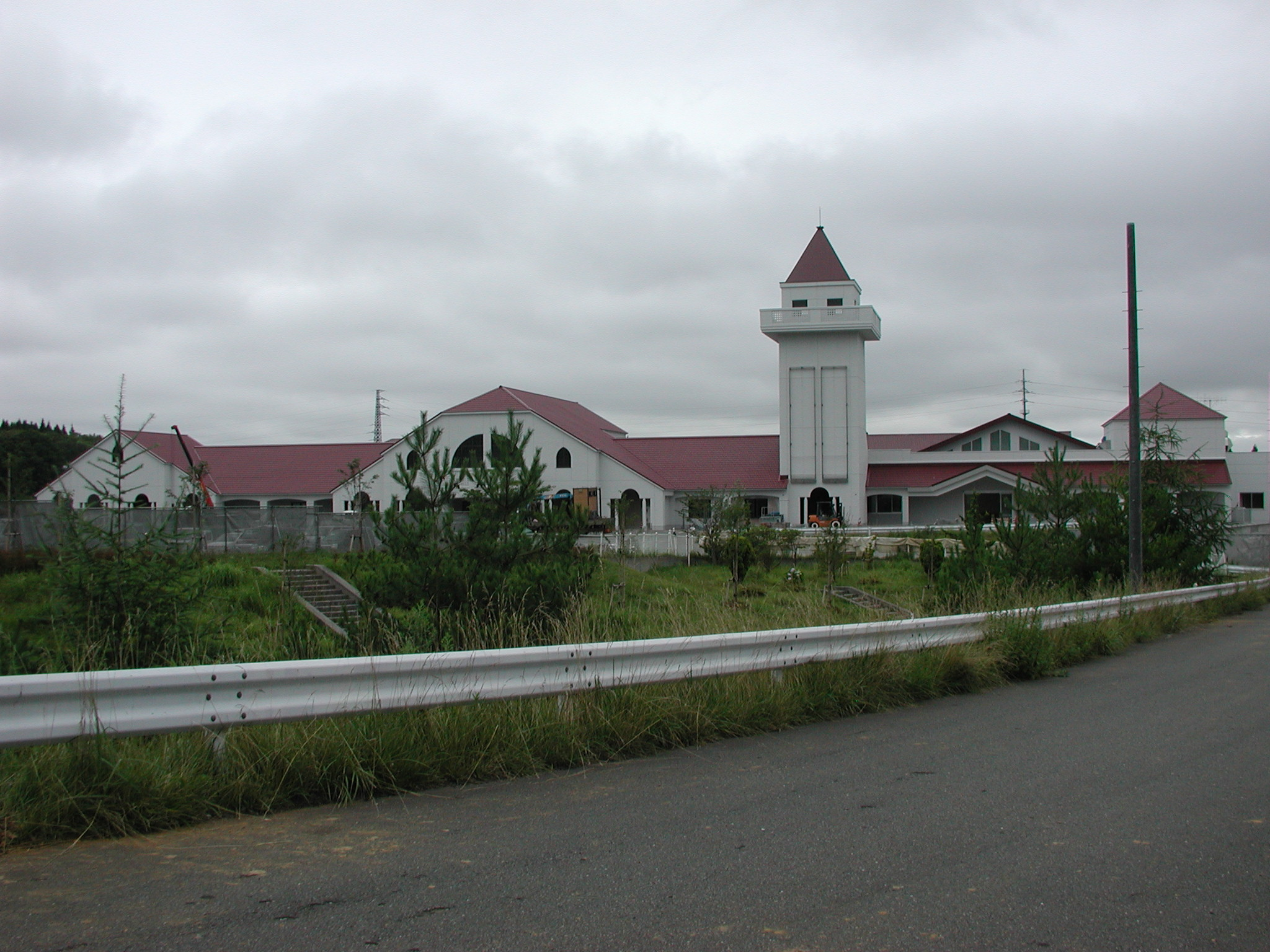
Mutsu City Hall

Mutsu (むつ市, Mutsu-shi; Japanese pronunciation: [mɯ̈́.t͡sɨ̀, mɯ̈̀.t͡sɨ̥.ɕì]) is a city located in Aomori Prefecture, Japan. As of 30 November 2025, the city had an estimated population of 50,589 in 27,960 households, and a population density of 59 persons per km^{2}. The total area of the city is 864.12 square kilometers (333.64 sq mi), making it the largest municipality in Aomori Prefecture in terms of area.

== Geography ==
Mutsu occupies most of Shimokita Peninsula and is bordered by Mutsu Bay to the south and Tsugaru Strait to the north, and is the northernmost city on the island of Honshū. The volcanic Osorezan Mountain Range extends across the western and central portion of the city, and includes a number of caldera lakes. Mount Hiuchidake, 781 meters above sea level, is on the north side, and Mount Osore is on the south side. At the center of Mount Osore is a caldera with a diameter of about 3 kilometers, inside which is a caldera lake called Lake Usori. Mount Kamabu (elevation 879 m) is located southeast of the caldera's outer rim, and is the highest point of Mount Osore. The Tanabe River, which originates from the Shimokita Hills, flows through Tanabu, the center of Mutsu City, and the Tanabe Plain spreads out in the basin. The population is concentrated in the Tanabe, Ōhira, and Ōminato neighborhoods. Ōminato is located at the foot of Mount Kamabu, facing Ōminato Bay, where the waves are calm. There is a sand spit called Ashizaki in Ōminato Bay, and the inside of the sand spit is called Ashizaki Bay, which is a natural harbor. The Shimokita hills stretch in the southeastern part of the city.

Parts of the city is within the limits of the Shimokita Hantō Quasi-National Park, including Mount Osore, Yagen Valley, and Taijima.

=== Neighboring municipalities ===
Aomori Prefecture

- Higashidōri
- Kazamaura
- Ōma
- Sai
- Yokohama

== Climate ==
Mutsu has a rare oceanic climate (Köppen: Cfb) or warm-summer humid continental climate (Dfb) by 0 °C isoterm, the south of the city being the northern boundary of the hot-summer type (Dfa) in Aomori, disregarding rural areas in the west. The city is characterized by warm summers and cool to cold winters with heavy snowfall. The average annual temperature in Mutsu is 9.8 °C. The average annual rainfall is 1339 mm with September as the wettest month. The temperatures are highest on average in August, at around 20.3 °C, and lowest in January, at around -4.6 °C.

Climate data for Mutsu (elevation 2.9 m, 1991–2020 normals, extremes 1935–present)
Month	Jan	Feb	Mar	Apr	May	Jun	Jul	Aug	Sep	Oct	Nov	Dec	Year
Record high °C (°F)	12.3 (54.1)	15.0 (59.0)	20.1 (68.2)	26.8 (80.2)	31.0 (87.8)	30.3 (86.5)	34.7 (94.5)	35.3 (95.5)	33.5 (92.3)	27.5 (81.5)	22.6 (72.7)	17.2 (63.0)	35.3 (95.5)
Mean maximum °C (°F)	6.8 (44.2)	8.4 (47.1)	14.4 (57.9)	21.0 (69.8)	25.4 (77.7)	27.5 (81.5)	30.6 (87.1)	31.4 (88.5)	28.9 (84.0)	23.1 (73.6)	18.0 (64.4)	11.3 (52.3)	32.0 (89.6)
Mean daily maximum °C (°F)	1.8 (35.2)	2.4 (36.3)	6.3 (43.3)	12.7 (54.9)	17.8 (64.0)	20.8 (69.4)	24.1 (75.4)	25.8 (78.4)	23.2 (73.8)	17.6 (63.7)	10.9 (51.6)	4.4 (39.9)	14.0 (57.2)
Daily mean °C (°F)	−1.2 (29.8)	−0.9 (30.4)	2.3 (36.1)	7.6 (45.7)	12.5 (54.5)	16.1 (61.0)	20.1 (68.2)	21.8 (71.2)	18.7 (65.7)	12.7 (54.9)	6.8 (44.2)	1.2 (34.2)	9.8 (49.6)
Mean daily minimum °C (°F)	−4.9 (23.2)	−4.9 (23.2)	−2.0 (28.4)	2.8 (37.0)	7.8 (46.0)	12.2 (54.0)	16.9 (62.4)	18.4 (65.1)	14.2 (57.6)	7.2 (45.0)	2.1 (35.8)	−2.5 (27.5)	5.6 (42.1)
Mean minimum °C (°F)	−11.9 (10.6)	−11.2 (11.8)	−8.0 (17.6)	−3.0 (26.6)	1.8 (35.2)	6.9 (44.4)	11.9 (53.4)	12.8 (55.0)	7.2 (45.0)	1.1 (34.0)	−3.3 (26.1)	−7.8 (18.0)	−13.0 (8.6)
Record low °C (°F)	−22.1 (−7.8)	−22.4 (−8.3)	−18.8 (−1.8)	−9.6 (14.7)	−2.8 (27.0)	1.8 (35.2)	6.1 (43.0)	9.0 (48.2)	1.9 (35.4)	−2.9 (26.8)	−9.6 (14.7)	−17.9 (−0.2)	−22.4 (−8.3)
Average precipitation mm (inches)	102.2 (4.02)	86.8 (3.42)	85.3 (3.36)	78.7 (3.10)	98.3 (3.87)	95.1 (3.74)	129.5 (5.10)	171.8 (6.76)	163.8 (6.45)	120.8 (4.76)	114.9 (4.52)	110.5 (4.35)	1,357.6 (53.45)
Average snowfall cm (inches)	121 (48)	104 (41)	61 (24)	4 (1.6)	0 (0)	0 (0)	0 (0)	0 (0)	0 (0)	0 (0)	10 (3.9)	66 (26)	365 (144)
Average precipitation days (≥ 1.0 mm)	17.6	14.8	13.4	10.7	10.3	8.2	9.2	9.9	10.2	11.6	14.6	16.4	146.9
Average relative humidity (%)	74	73	71	70	76	83	86	85	82	77	74	74	77
Mean monthly sunshine hours	67.7	88.2	141.3	184.7	196.9	163.6	131.5	139.0	145.0	150.7	98.3	70.6	1,577.4
Source: Japan Meteorological Agency (1991–2020 normals, extremes 1935–present)

Climate data for Wakinosawa, Mutsu (elevation 15 m, 1991–2020 normals, extremes 1976–present)
Month	Jan	Feb	Mar	Apr	May	Jun	Jul	Aug	Sep	Oct	Nov	Dec	Year
Record high °C (°F)	11.6 (52.9)	14.5 (58.1)	20.4 (68.7)	26.7 (80.1)	31.2 (88.2)	31.1 (88.0)	33.6 (92.5)	34.7 (94.5)	32.8 (91.0)	26.5 (79.7)	22.8 (73.0)	16.4 (61.5)	34.7 (94.5)
Mean daily maximum °C (°F)	1.8 (35.2)	2.3 (36.1)	5.9 (42.6)	11.8 (53.2)	16.8 (62.2)	20.1 (68.2)	23.6 (74.5)	25.4 (77.7)	22.9 (73.2)	17.3 (63.1)	10.7 (51.3)	4.5 (40.1)	13.6 (56.5)
Daily mean °C (°F)	−0.6 (30.9)	−0.4 (31.3)	2.5 (36.5)	7.4 (45.3)	12.1 (53.8)	15.9 (60.6)	20.0 (68.0)	21.9 (71.4)	18.9 (66.0)	13.2 (55.8)	7.3 (45.1)	1.7 (35.1)	10.0 (50.0)
Mean daily minimum °C (°F)	−3.1 (26.4)	−3.1 (26.4)	−1.0 (30.2)	2.9 (37.2)	7.7 (45.9)	12.2 (54.0)	17.1 (62.8)	18.8 (65.8)	15.1 (59.2)	8.8 (47.8)	3.5 (38.3)	−1.1 (30.0)	6.5 (43.7)
Record low °C (°F)	−15.1 (4.8)	−12.6 (9.3)	−10.1 (13.8)	−7.4 (18.7)	−1.1 (30.0)	3.8 (38.8)	6.8 (44.2)	9.9 (49.8)	4.8 (40.6)	−0.3 (31.5)	−5.7 (21.7)	−10.3 (13.5)	−15.1 (4.8)
Average precipitation mm (inches)	108.6 (4.28)	75.1 (2.96)	68.6 (2.70)	74.4 (2.93)	92.3 (3.63)	93.5 (3.68)	133.0 (5.24)	176.0 (6.93)	152.6 (6.01)	107.7 (4.24)	123.3 (4.85)	121.8 (4.80)	1,326.7 (52.23)
Average snowfall cm (inches)	180 (71)	146 (57)	84 (33)	5 (2.0)	0 (0)	0 (0)	0 (0)	0 (0)	0 (0)	0 (0)	15 (5.9)	114 (45)	546 (215)
Average precipitation days (≥ 1.0 mm)	20.7	17.2	14.9	11.4	10.2	8.9	9.9	10.7	11.5	13.2	17.2	20.4	166.2
Mean monthly sunshine hours	60.4	81.3	144.7	196.3	206.0	179.4	143.5	161.7	163.9	154.4	91.2	62.0	1,644.8
Source: Japan Meteorological Agency (1991–2020 normals, extremes 1976–present)

== Demographics ==
Per Japanese census data, the population of Mutsu has declined over the past 40 years.

Historical population

Year	Pop.	±%
1920	34,129	—
1930	37,006	+8.4%
1940	45,887	+24.0%
1950	62,918	+37.1%
1960	65,880	+4.7%
1970	66,447	+0.9%

Year	Pop.	±%
1980	71,567	+7.7%
1990	68,637	−4.1%
2000	67,022	−2.4%
2010	61,066	−8.9%
2020	56,244	−7.9%

== History ==
Mutsu was founded on September 1, 1959 through the merger of the former towns of Ōminato (大湊) and Tanabu (田名部). Tanabu had been the location of a daikansho under the Morioka Domain in the Edo period, and was a resettlement and colonization zone for dispossessed ex-samurai of the defeated Aizu Domain after the Boshin War. The village of Ōminato was established with the creation of the modern municipalities system on 1 April 1889, and was raised to town status on November 10, 1928. Ōminato was a port town, and home to the Ōminato Guard District, a major base for the Imperial Japanese Navy until the end of World War II. The town and its military base were bombed repeatedly from the middle of July to middle of August 1945, including one major attack on Ōminato on August 9. The base facilities were used by the United States Navy during the occupation of Japan, and (on a reduced scale) by the Japan Maritime Self Defence Force to date.

Ōminato merged with the adjacent town of Tanabe to form the city Ōminato-Tanabu (coupling of the names of two antecedent towns) on September 1, 1959; its name was changed to Mutsu in 1960. At the time, it was the only city with a hiragana name (むつ), which was adopted to avoid confusion with the original kanji word Mutsu (陸奥) which indicates the old province that covered most of the modern Tōhoku region.

On March 14, 2005, the towns of Kawauchi and Ōhata, and the village of Wakinosawa (all from Shimokita District) were merged into Mutsu.

== Government ==
Mutsu has a mayor-council form of government with a directly elected mayor and a unicameral city legislature of 26 members. Mutsu, together with Shimokita District, contributes three members to the Aomori Prefectural Assembly. In terms of national politics, the city is part of Aomori 1st district of the lower house of the Diet of Japan.

== Economy ==
The economy of Mutsu is heavily dependent on agriculture, forestry and fishing, especially scallop aquaculture in Mutsu Bay. The city is also the location for various facilities of the Japan Atomic Energy Agency, and was the home port for the nuclear powered research vessel Mutsu, until its decommissioning in 1997.

== Education ==
Mutsu has 12 public elementary schools and nine middle schools operated by the city government, and four public high schools operated by the Aomori Prefectural Board of Education. The prefecture also operates one special education school for the handicapped. The Aomori Akenohoshi Junior College has a campus in Mutsu.

=== High schools ===
- Kawauchi Branch of Aomori Prefectural Ominato High School
- Mutsu Technical High School
- Ōminato High School
- Tanabu High School

== Transportation ==
=== Railway ===
East Japan Railway Company (JR East) – Ōminato Line

- Chikagawa – Kanayasawa – Akagawa – Shimokita – Ōminato

=== Highway ===
- Shimokita Expressway
- National Route 279
- National Route 338

=== Air ===
The city does not have an airport. The nearest airports are:

- Hakodate Airport (61 km away)
- Aomori Airport (75 km away)
- Misawa Airport (88 km away)

== Sister city relations ==
- Port Angeles, Washington, United States and Mutsu became sister cities in 1995. They have operated an exchange student program intermittently since 1997.

== Local attractions ==
- Kawauchi Dam, northernmost dam on Honshu
- Lake Usori
- Mount Osore
- Yagen Valley
- Mutsu Science Museum
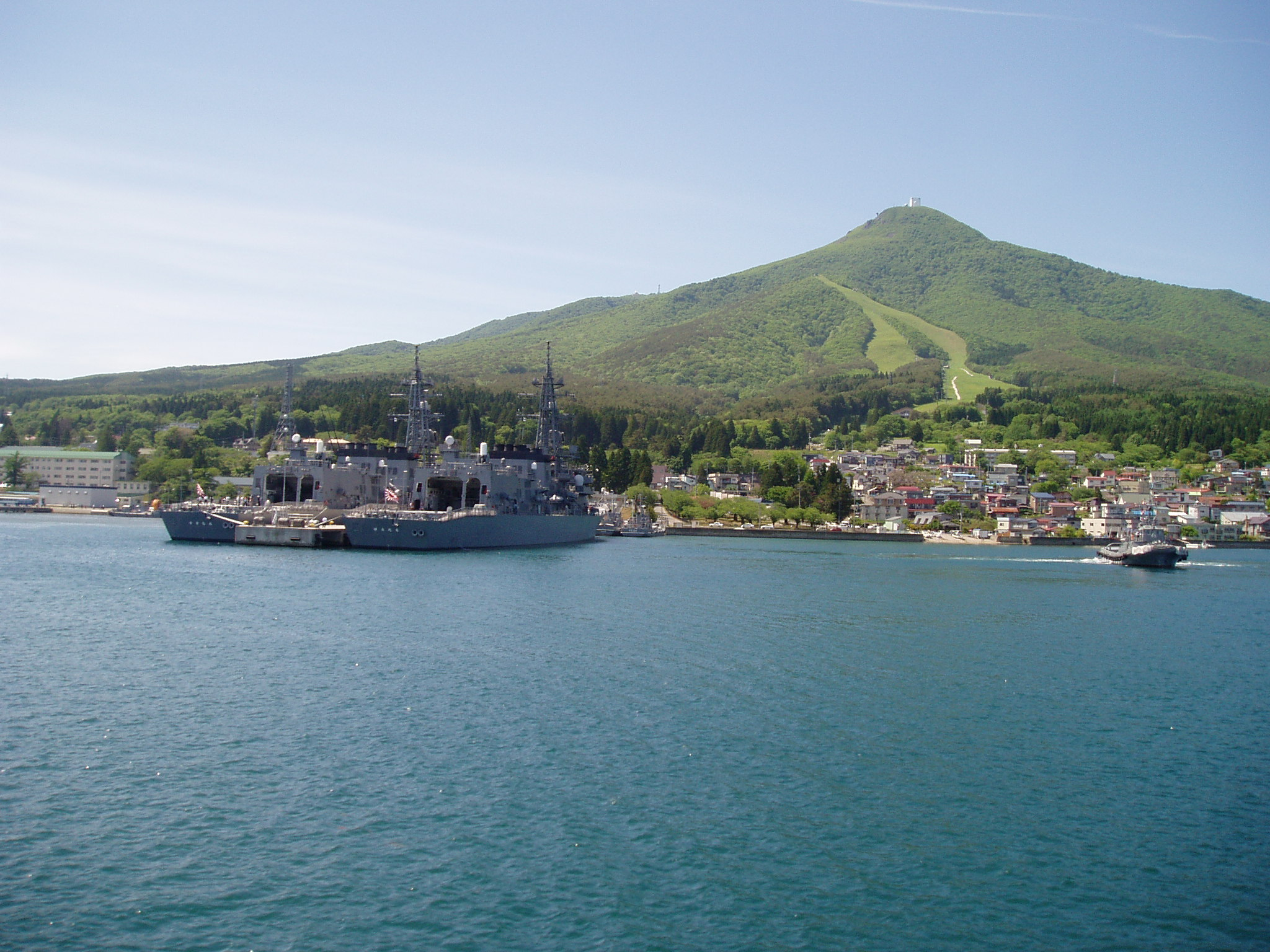
Mount Kamifusa

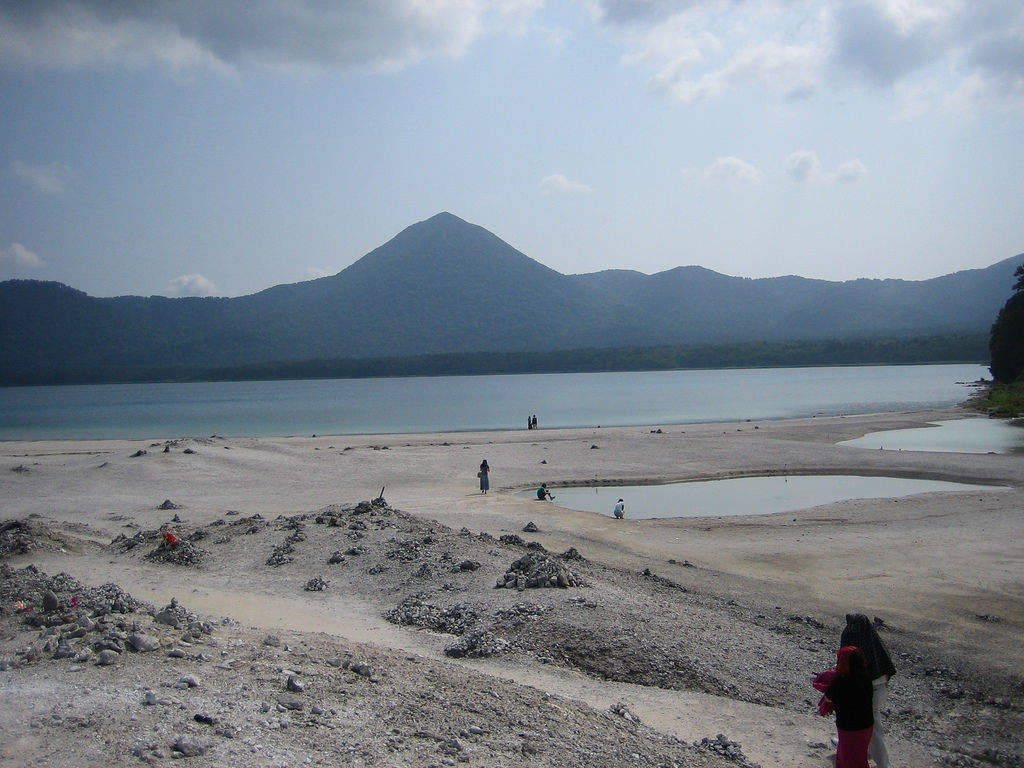
Mount Osorezan

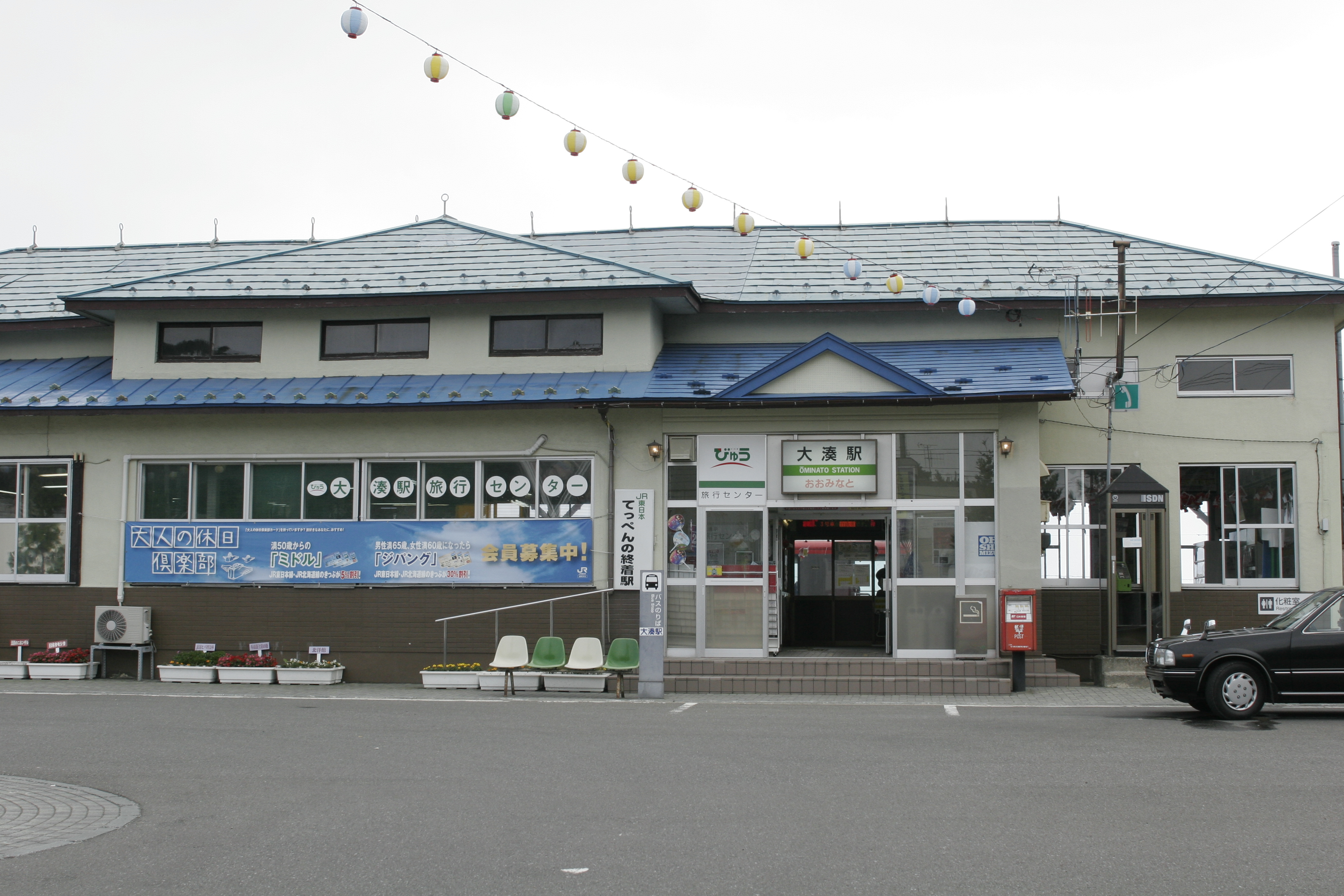
Ominato Station

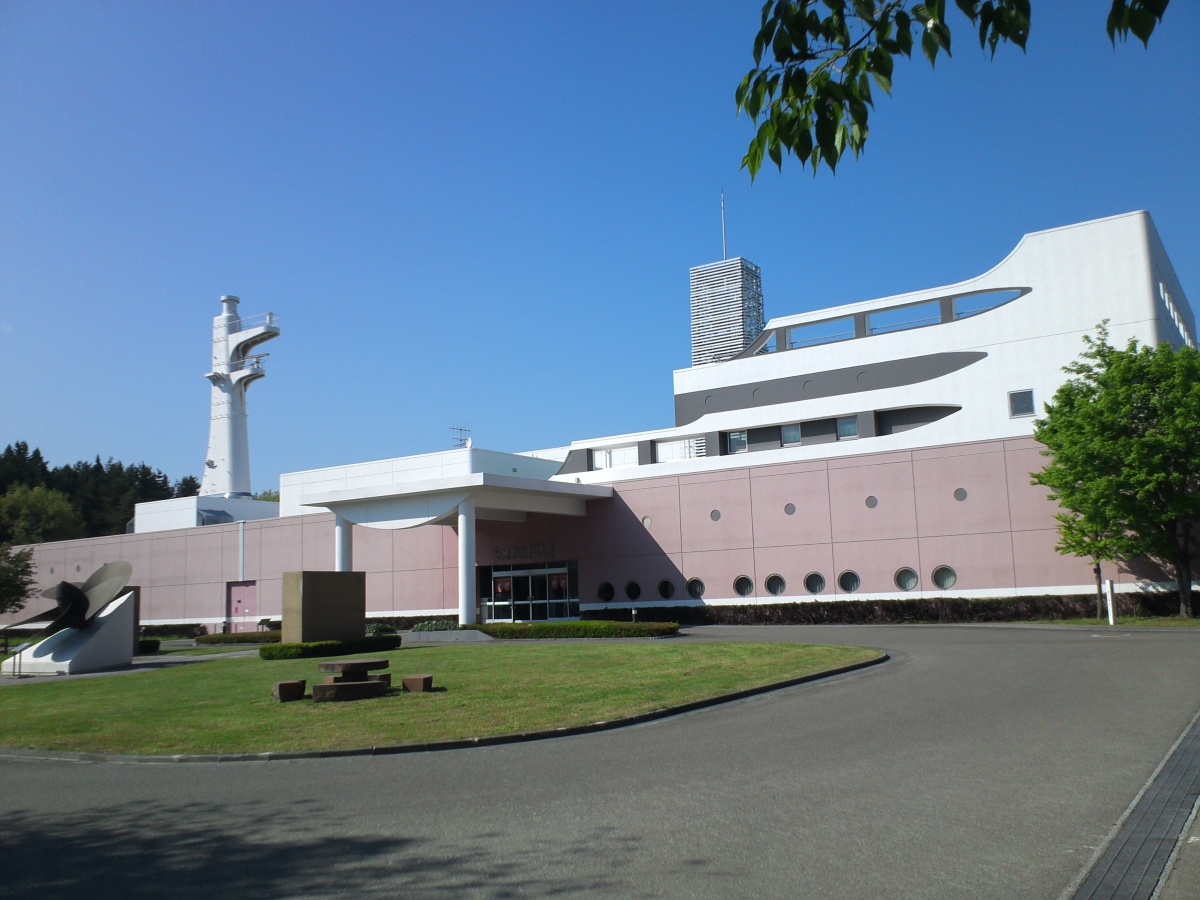
Mutsu Science Museum

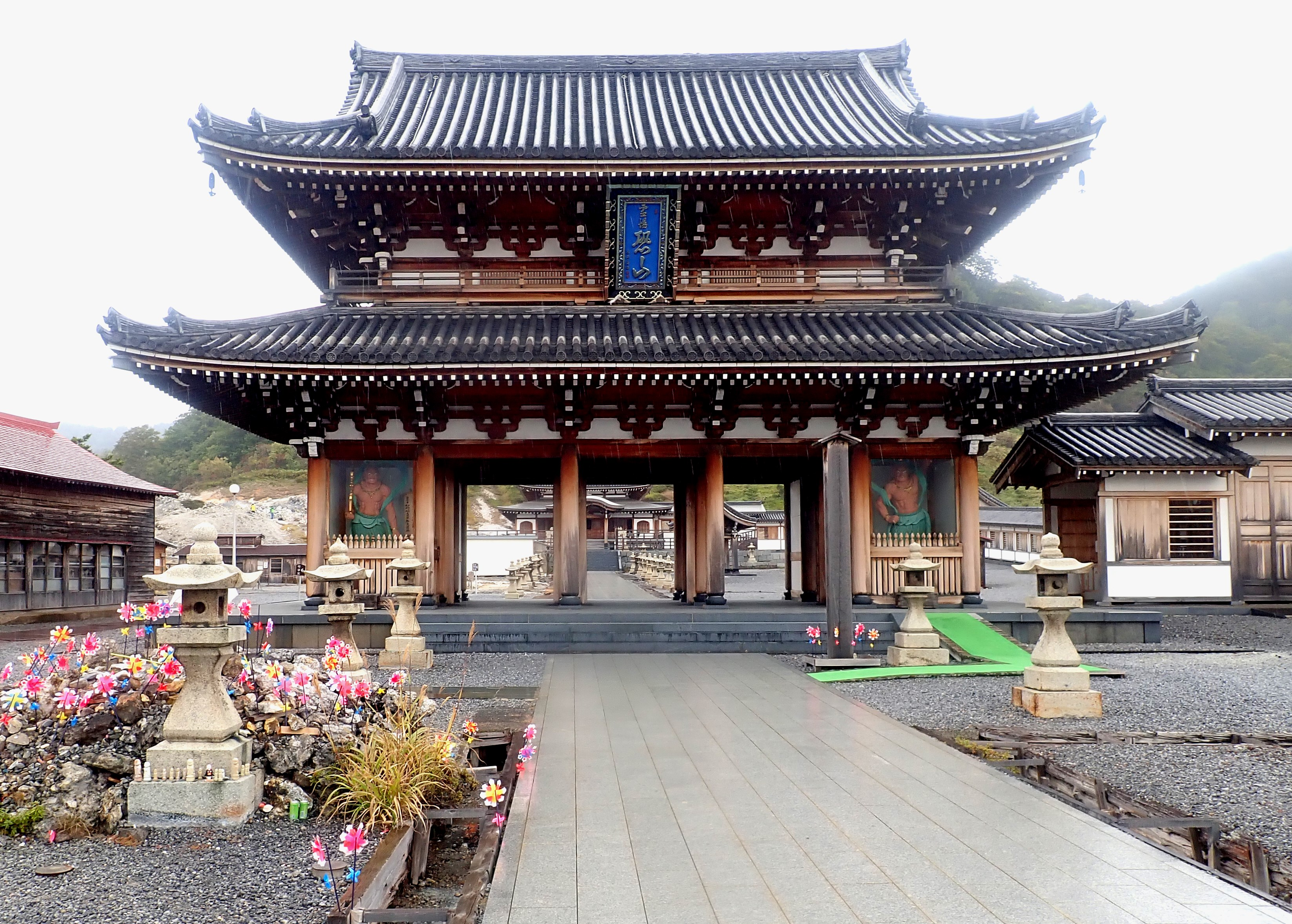
Osorezan Bodai-ji

== Noted people from Mutsu ==
- Yuya Asahina, manga artist
- Ryu Fujisaki, manga artist
- Fumie Hosokawa, actress and gravure model
- Yuzo Kawashima, movie director
- Kenichi Matsuyama, actor
