= Yuya Asahina =

Japanese manga artist

- Born: September 7, 1980 (age 46); Mutsu, Aomori, Japan
- Occupation: Manga artist
- Website: Yuya Asahina's website

Yūya Asahina (朝比奈 ゆうや, Asahina Yūya; born September 7, 1980) is a Japanese manga artist. She made her professional manga debut in 1998. She used to work with Ribon, but now her manga is serialized in Margaret Comics.

== Works ==
- ± Junkie
- Love Luck
- Strange Orange 2006
