= Wakinosawa, Aomori =

Wakinosawa 脇野沢村
- Former municipality
- Flag Seal

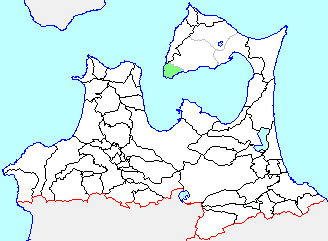
- Location of Wakinosawa in Aomori Prefecture

- Location in Japan
- Coordinates: 41°08′31″N 140°49′10″E
- Country: Japan
- Region: Tōhoku
- Prefecture: Aomori Prefecture
- District: Shimokita
- Merged: March 1, 2005 (now part of Mutsu)

Area
  - Total: 58.59 km^{2} (22.62 sq mi)

Population (February 1, 2006)
  - Total: 2,461
  - Density: 42.06/km^{2} (108.9/sq mi)
- Time zone: UTC+09:00 (JST)
- Climate: Cfa/Cfb
- Website: Mutsu official website
- Symbols
- Bird: Common gull
- Flower: Sakura
- Tree: Chamaecyparis pisifera

Wakinosawa (脇野沢村, Wakinosawa-mura) was a village located in Shimokita District in northern Aomori Prefecture, Japan.

== History ==
Wakinosawa Village was founded in 1889 from the merger the hamlets of Wakinosawa with neighboring Ozawa.

On March 14, 2005, Wakinosawa, along with the neighboring towns of Kawauchi and Ōhata (all from Shimokita District), was merged into the neighboring and expanded city of Mutsu, and thus no longer exists as an independent municipality.

== Geography and economy ==
Located at the southwestern tip of Shimokita Peninsula facing Mutsu Bay, the village of Wakinosawa had an economy based primarily on commercial fishing.

Wakinosawa was served by Route 338 (Japan) highway, but had no railway service. Ferries connect the fishing port with Aomori and Kanita on the opposite side of Mutsu Bay.

== Population ==
At the time of its merger, the village had an estimated population of 2,461 and a population density of 42.06 persons per km^{2}. The total area was 58.59 km^{2}.

== Climate ==
Climate data for Wakinosawa (1991−2020 normals, extremes 1976−present)
Month	Jan	Feb	Mar	Apr	May	Jun	Jul	Aug	Sep	Oct	Nov	Dec	Year
Record high °C (°F)	11.1 (52.0)	14.0 (57.2)	20.4 (68.7)	26.7 (80.1)	31.2 (88.2)	31.1 (88.0)	33.6 (92.5)	34.2 (93.6)	32.8 (91.0)	26.5 (79.7)	21.6 (70.9)	16.4 (61.5)	34.2 (93.6)
Mean daily maximum °C (°F)	1.8 (35.2)	2.3 (36.1)	5.9 (42.6)	11.8 (53.2)	16.8 (62.2)	20.1 (68.2)	23.6 (74.5)	25.4 (77.7)	22.9 (73.2)	17.3 (63.1)	10.7 (51.3)	4.5 (40.1)	13.6 (56.5)
Daily mean °C (°F)	−0.6 (30.9)	−0.4 (31.3)	2.5 (36.5)	7.4 (45.3)	12.1 (53.8)	15.9 (60.6)	20.0 (68.0)	21.9 (71.4)	18.9 (66.0)	13.2 (55.8)	7.3 (45.1)	1.7 (35.1)	10.0 (50.0)
Mean daily minimum °C (°F)	−3.1 (26.4)	−3.1 (26.4)	−1.0 (30.2)	2.9 (37.2)	7.7 (45.9)	12.2 (54.0)	17.1 (62.8)	18.8 (65.8)	15.1 (59.2)	8.8 (47.8)	3.5 (38.3)	−1.1 (30.0)	6.5 (43.7)
Record low °C (°F)	−15.1 (4.8)	−12.6 (9.3)	−10.1 (13.8)	−7.4 (18.7)	−1.1 (30.0)	3.8 (38.8)	6.8 (44.2)	9.9 (49.8)	4.8 (40.6)	−0.3 (31.5)	−5.7 (21.7)	−10.3 (13.5)	−15.1 (4.8)
Average precipitation mm (inches)	108.6 (4.28)	75.1 (2.96)	68.6 (2.70)	74.4 (2.93)	92.3 (3.63)	93.5 (3.68)	133.0 (5.24)	176.0 (6.93)	152.6 (6.01)	107.7 (4.24)	123.3 (4.85)	121.8 (4.80)	1,326.7 (52.23)
Average snowfall cm (inches)	180 (71)	146 (57)	84 (33)	5 (2.0)	0 (0)	0 (0)	0 (0)	0 (0)	0 (0)	0 (0)	15 (5.9)	114 (45)	546 (215)
Average precipitation days (≥ 1.0 mm)	20.7	17.2	14.9	11.4	10.2	8.9	9.9	10.7	11.5	13.2	17.2	20.4	166.2
Average snowy days (≥ 3 cm)	19.2	16.5	10.7	0.6	0	0	0	0	0	0	1.8	12.9	61.7
Mean monthly sunshine hours	60.4	81.3	144.7	196.3	206.0	179.4	143.5	161.7	163.9	154.4	91.2	62.0	1,644.8
Source: JMA
