= Kawauchi, Aomori =

Kawauchi 川内町
- Former municipality
- Flag Emblem

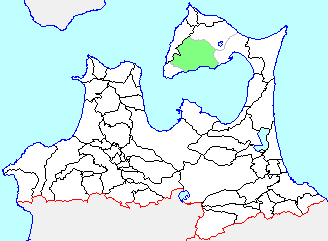
- Location of Kawauchi in Aomori Prefecture

- Location in Japan
- Coordinates: 41°11′51.1″N 140°59′52.5″E
- Country: Japan
- Region: Tōhoku
- Prefecture: Aomori Prefecture
- District: Shimokita
- Merged: March 1, 2005 (now part of Mutsu)

Area
  - Total: 323.67 km^{2} (124.97 sq mi)

Population (March 1, 2005)
  - Total: 5,309
  - Density: 16.4/km^{2} (42/sq mi)
- Time zone: UTC+09:00 (JST)
- Website: www.city.mutsu.lg.jp
- Symbols
- Bird: White wagtail
- Flower: Hydrangea
- Tree: Chamaecyparis pisifera

Kawauchi (川内町, Kawauchi-machi) was a town located in Shimokita District in northern Aomori Prefecture, Japan.

Kawauchi Village was founded in 1889 from the merger the hamlets of Kawauchi, Hinokigawa, Shukunohe, and Kakizaki. It was elevated to town status on October 31, 1917.

On March 14, 2005, Kawauchi, along with the neighboring town of Ōhata, and the village of Wakinosawa (all from Shimokita District), was merged into the neighboring and expanded city of Mutsu, and thus no longer exists as an independent municipality.

Located in southern Shimokita Peninsula facing Mutsu Bay, the town of Kawauchi had an economy based on commercial fishing (scallops and sea cucumber), forestry and agriculture (rice, tobacco).

At the time of its merger, the town had an estimated population of 5,309 and a population density of 16.4 persons per km^{2}. The total area was 323.67 km^{2}.

Kawauchi was served by Route 338 highway, but had no railway service.

== Famous people ==
- Ryu Fujisaki, manga artist
