= Ōhata, Aomori =

Ōhata 大畑町
- Former municipality
- Flag Seal

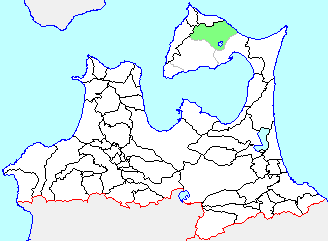
- Location of Ōhata in Aomori Prefecture

- Location in Japan
- Coordinates: 41.403419°N 141.161957°E
- Country: Japan
- Region: Tōhoku
- Prefecture: Aomori Prefecture
- District: Shimokita
- Merged: March 1, 2005 (now part of Mutsu)

Area
  - Total: 58.59 km^{2} (22.62 sq mi)

Population (1 February 2006)
  - Total: 8,663
  - Density: 147.8/km^{2} (383/sq mi)
- Time zone: UTC+09:00 (JST)
- Website: Mutsu official website
- Symbols
- Bird: Common gull
- Flower: Sakura
- Tree: Chamaecyparis pisifera

Ōhata (大畑町, Ōhata-machi) was a town located in Shimokita District in northern Aomori Prefecture, Japan.

== Population ==
At the time of its merger, the town had an estimated population of 8,663 and a population density of 147.8 persons per km^{2}.

== History ==
Ōhata Village was founded in 1889. It was elevated to town status on 1 May 1934.

On 14 March 2005, Ōhata, along with the neighboring town of Kawauchi, and the village of Wakinosawa (all from Shimokita District), was merged into the neighboring and expanded city of Mutsu, and thus no longer exists as an independent municipality.

== Geography ==
Located in northern Shimokita Peninsula facing Tsugaru Strait. The total area was 58.59 km^{2}.

== Economy ==
The town of Ōhata had an economy based primarily on commercial fishing, primarily squid, octopus, salmon and sea urchin.

== Access ==
Ōhata was served by National Route 279, but had no railway service. Formerly, the Ōhata Line connected Ōhata Station with Shimokita Station via eight stations from 1939 to 2001. The train has now been replaced by a bus service.
