= Shimokita District, Aomori =

District in Aomori prefecture, Japan

Coordinates: 41°17′N 141°13′E

Location of Shimokita District in Aomori Prefecture.

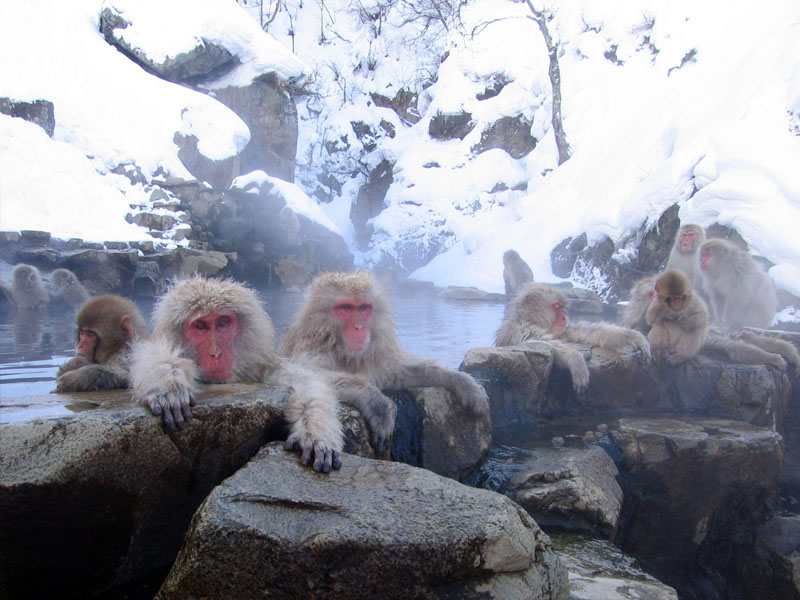
Japanese monkeys

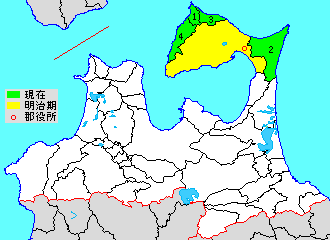
Location of Shimokita-gun, Aomori Prefecture, highlighted in green; with former areas in yellow. Current status of the district.: 1. Ōma-machi; 2. Higashidōri-mura; 3. Kazamaura-mura; 4. Sai-mura

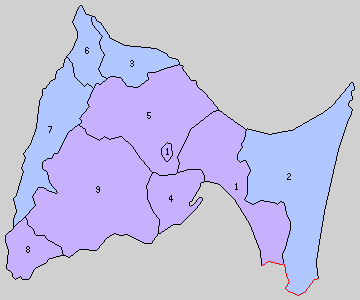
Colored areas are in the district.: 1. Tanabu-machi (now part of Mutsu-shi); 2. Higashidōri-mura; 3. Kazamaura-mura; 4. Ōminato-machi (now part of Mutsu-shi); 5. Ōhata-machi (now part of Mutsu-shi); 6. Ōma-machi; 7. Sai-mura; 8. Wakinosawa-mura (now part of Mutsu-shi); 9. Kawauchi-machi (now part of Mutsu-shi)

Shimokita District (下北郡, Shimokita-gun) is a district located in Aomori Prefecture, Japan. It occupies most of the northern handle of Shimokita Peninsula with the exception of Mutsu City and contains the most northern point on the island of Honshū. It is also home to the Japanese macaque, making it the northernmost natural habitat for monkeys anywhere in the world.

As of 2009, the district has an estimated population of 18,297 and a density of 33.2 persons per km^{2}. The total area was 551.08 km^{2}.

== Politics ==
In terms of national politics, the district is represented in the Diet of Japan's House of Representatives as a part of the Aomori 1st district.

== Towns and villages ==
The district consists of one town and three villages. The city of Mutsu was formerly part of the district.

- Ōma
- Higashidōri
- Kazamaura
- Sai

== History ==
Shimokita District was part of ancient Kita County (北郡, Kita-gun), established by the Northern Fujiwara. During the Edo period, the area was part of the Morioka han feudal domain of the Nanbu clan, with a daikansho located in Tanabu (now part of the city of Mutsu.

The Nanbu clan sided with the Ōuetsu Reppan Dōmei during the Boshin War of the Meiji Restoration and were punished by the new Meiji government by loss of their northern territories. In November 1869, Kita-gun and neighboring Sannohe District became part of the newly created Tonami Domain (斗南藩, Tonami-han), a 30,000 koku holding created to resettle the dispossessed Matsudaira clan from Aizu-Wakamatsu. In July 1871, with the abolition of the han system, Tonami Domain became Tonami Prefecture, and was merged into the newly created Aomori Prefecture in September 1871.

During the early Meiji period administrative reorganization of Japan on July 22, 1878, Shimokita and Kamikita were divided from former Kita County, and Shimokita was divided into 33 villages. In the cadastral reform of April 1, 1889, the number of villages was reduced through consolidations and mergers to nine.

=== District Timeline ===
- On January 1, 1899 - The village of Tanabu was elevated to town status.
- On October 31, 1917 - The village of Kawauchi was elevated to town status.
- On November 10, 1928 - The Imperial Japanese Navy port of Ōminato was elevated to town status.
- On May 1, 1934 - The village of Ōhata was elevated to town status.
- On November 3, 1942 - The village of Ōma was elevated to town status.
- On September 1, 1959 - The towns of Ōminato and Tanabu merged to create the city of Ōminato-Tanabu, later renamed Mutsu.

=== District Background ===
pre-1889	April 1, 1889	1889–1949	1950–1989		1989–present	present
Ōma-mura; Okoppe-mura	Ōoku-mura	November 3, 1942; Ōma-machi	Ōma-machi		Ōma-machi	Ōma
Shimofuro-mura; Ikokuma-mura; Hebiurakani-mura	Kazamaura-mura	Kazamaura-mura	Kazamaura-mura		Kazamaura-mura	Kazamaura
Sai-mura; Chogo-mura	Sai-mura	Sai-mura	Sai-mura		Sai-mura	Sai
Tanabu-mura; Sekine-mura; Okunai-mura; Nakanosawa-mura	Tanabu-mura	January 1, 1901; Tanabu-machi	September 1, 1959; Ōminato-Tanabu-shi	August 1, 1960 renamed as Mutsu-shi	Mutsu-shi	Mutsu
Ōminato-mura; Ōdaira-mura; Jogasawa-mura	Ōminato-mura	November 10, 1928; Ōminato-machi	September 1, 1959; Ōminato-Tanabu-shi	August 1, 1960 renamed as Mutsu-shi	Mutsu-shi	Mutsu
Kawauchi-mura; Hikawa-mura; Shukuohe-mura; Kakizaki-mura	Kawauchi-mura	October 31, 1917; Kawauchi-machi	Kawauchi-machi		March 14, 2005 merged into Mutsu-shi	Mutsu
Ōhata-mura; Shozugawa-mura	Ōhata-mura	May 1, 1934; Ōhata-machi	Ōhata-machi		March 14, 2005 merged into Mutsu-shi	Mutsu
Wakinosawa-mura; Ozawa-mura	Wakinosawa-mura	Wakinosawa-mura	Wakinosawa-mura		March 14, 2005 merged into Mutsu-shi	Mutsu
Ōri-mura; Mena-mura; Gamanosawa-mura; Noushi-mura; Iwaya-mura; Shikariya-mura; Shitsukari-mura; Sarugamori-mura; Odanozawa-mura; Shiranuka-mura; Sunagomata-mura; Taya-mura	Higashidōri-mura	Higashidōri-mura	Higashidōri-mura		Higashidōri-mura	Higashidōri

=== Recent mergers ===
- On March 14, 2005 - The towns of Kawauchi and Ōhata and the village of Wakinosawa were merged into the expanded city of Mutsu.
