= Mount Osore =

Temple in Aomori Prefecture, Japan

Osore-zan Bodai-ji
- 恐山 菩提寺
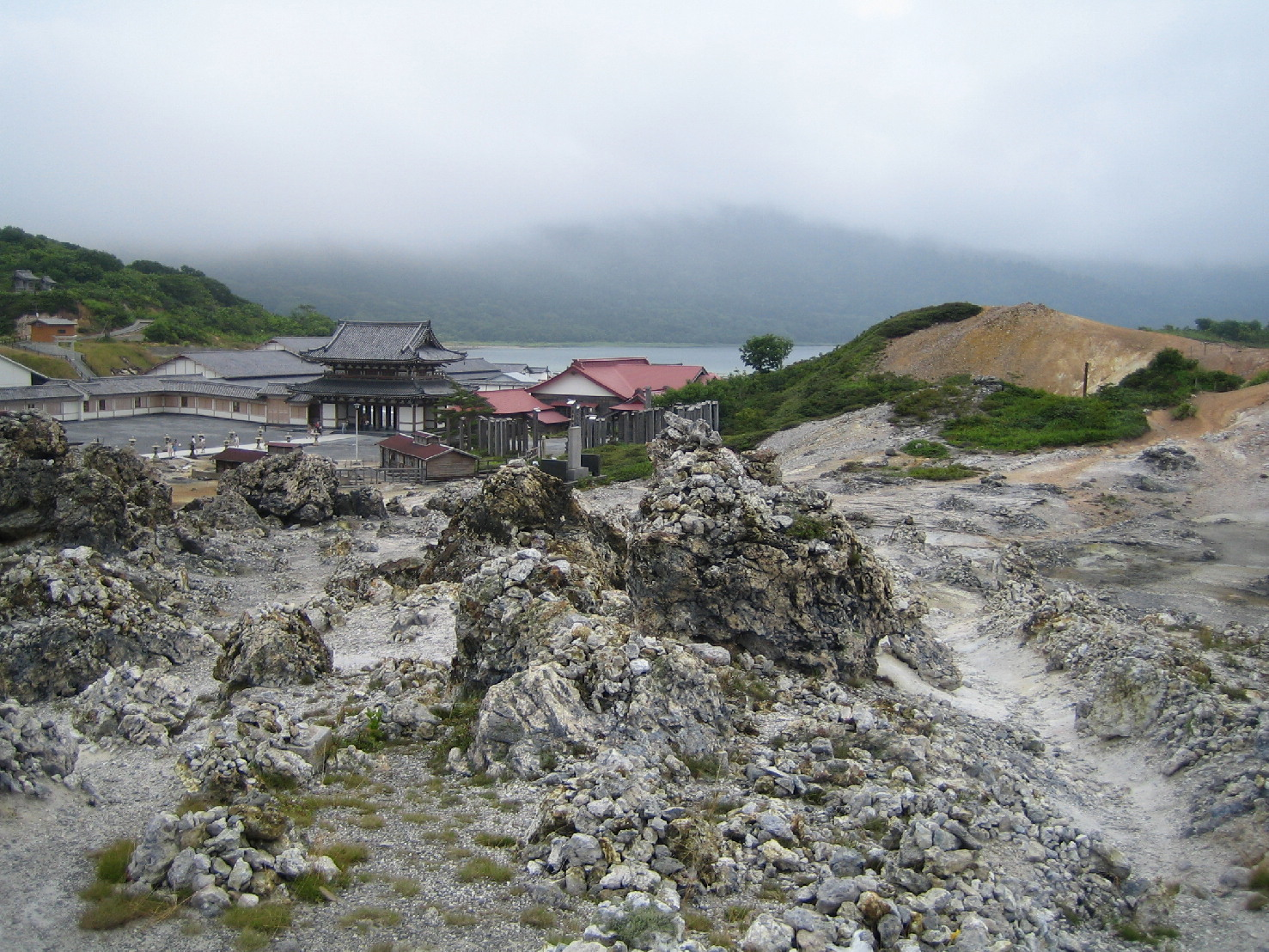
- Grounds of Bodai-ji

- Mount Osore Mount Osore (Japan)

Religion
- Affiliation: Buddhism
- Sect: Sōtō Zen
- Deity: Jizō Bosatsu

Location
- Location: 3-2 Tanabu Usoriyama, Mutsu-shi, Aomori-ken
- Country: Japan
- Interactive map of Osore-zan Bodai-ji
- Coordinates: 41°19′37.39″N 141°5′24.97″E

Architecture
- Founder: Ennin
- Established: 862

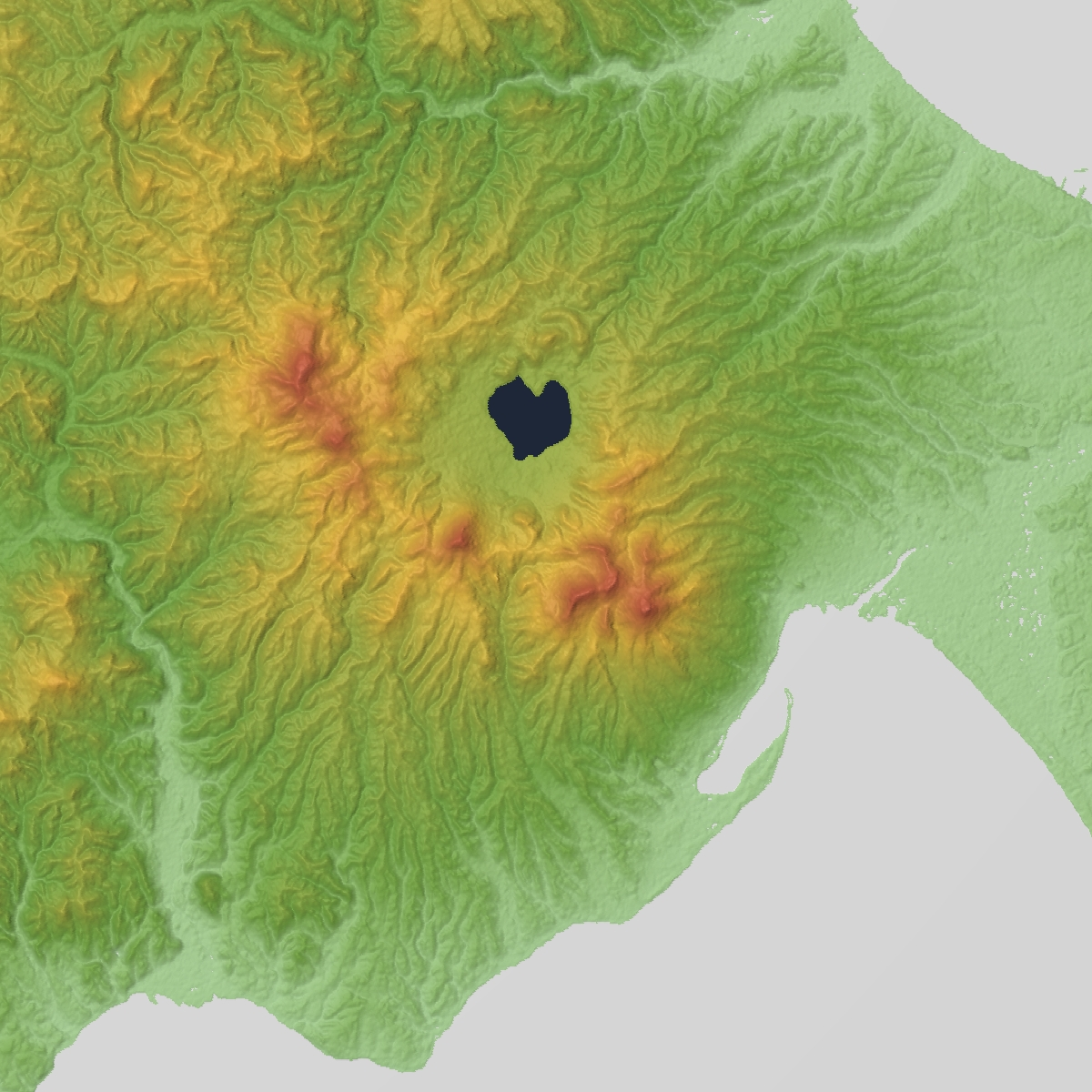
Osore Volcano

Mount Osore (恐山, Osore-zan) is the name of a Buddhist temple and folk religion pilgrimage destination in the center of remote Shimokita Peninsula of Aomori Prefecture, in the northern Tōhoku region of northern Japan. The temple is located in the caldera of an active volcano and is believed in Japanese mythology to be one of the gates to the underworld.

== Etymology ==
The name originally comes from the Ainu language, with the form later phonetically changed when borrowed into the Japanese language to match the Japanese word osore (恐れ), meaning "dread", likely due to the desolation of the volcanic landscape. The Ainu name for the area may have been usori (of indeterminate meaning), or ushoro ("gulf, large bay", possibly in reference to Mutsu Bay) or possibly even usat oro nupuri ("mountain in cinders", a name recorded in some of the stories about Ennin).

== Osorezan volcano ==
The Osorezan Mountain Range (恐山山地, Osore-zan Sanchi) is a series of eight somma volcanos ranging from east to west in the centre of Shimokita Peninsula. Mt. Kamafuse, the highest mountain in the range, has a height of 878 metres (2,881 ft). Although the Osorezan volcano`s last magma eruption took place over 10,000 years ago, the area has many fumaroles emitting steam and volcanic gases (especially sulfur dioxide), indicating that it is still an active volcano. Lake Usori is a caldera lake at the center of the volcanic range, with highly acidic waters.

During the Meiji period, sulphur deposits in the area were exploited, partly to meet the demand for gunpowder production by the growing Japanese military; however the deposits were not economical to mine due to the remoteness of the site and the increasing availability of sulphur as a byproduct of petroleum refining.

== Bodai-ji temple and pilgrimage location ==
The mountain is the location of a Sōtō Zen Buddhist temple, Bodai-ji (菩提寺), which claims to have been founded in 862 AD by the famed monk Ennin, with Jizō Bosatsu as its main image. The temple was abandoned in 1457 and restored back to use in 1530. In popular folk religion, the otherworldly setting of Mount Osore, with its charred landscape of blasted rocks filled with bubbling pits noted for unearthly hues and noxious fumes came to be one of several places in Japan identified to be an entrance to the Underworld. A small brook running to the neighboring Lake Usori was equated to the Sanzu River, a river that deceased souls need to cross on their way to the afterlife.

A unique feature of Bodai-ji is the presence of mediums known as itako who claim to summon the souls of the dead and deliver messages in their voices. These mediums were traditionally blind and had to receive extensive spiritual training and purification rituals; however, in modern times, their number has dwindled and not all are blind. The temple has a twice-yearly Itako Taisai festival held in summer and autumn.

The temple also maintains a hot spring resort for use by pilgrims and tourists.

=== In modern culture ===
The work of contemporary artist Nara Yoshitomo, who is a native of Aomori Prefecture, is believed to be influenced, at least subconsciously, by Mount Osore (Ivy, 2010). For instance, his piece entitled “Not Everything But/ Green House” depicts a small female child standing over a pile of discarded dolls of varying characteristics and eras much like those observed at Mount Osore.

As part of a collection of fictional fungi, artist Takeshi Yamada created the Oh-dokuro-dake (or “skull mushroom”) and the story surrounding their presence on Mount Osore for his "center for medical mycology" art project.

== Gallery ==
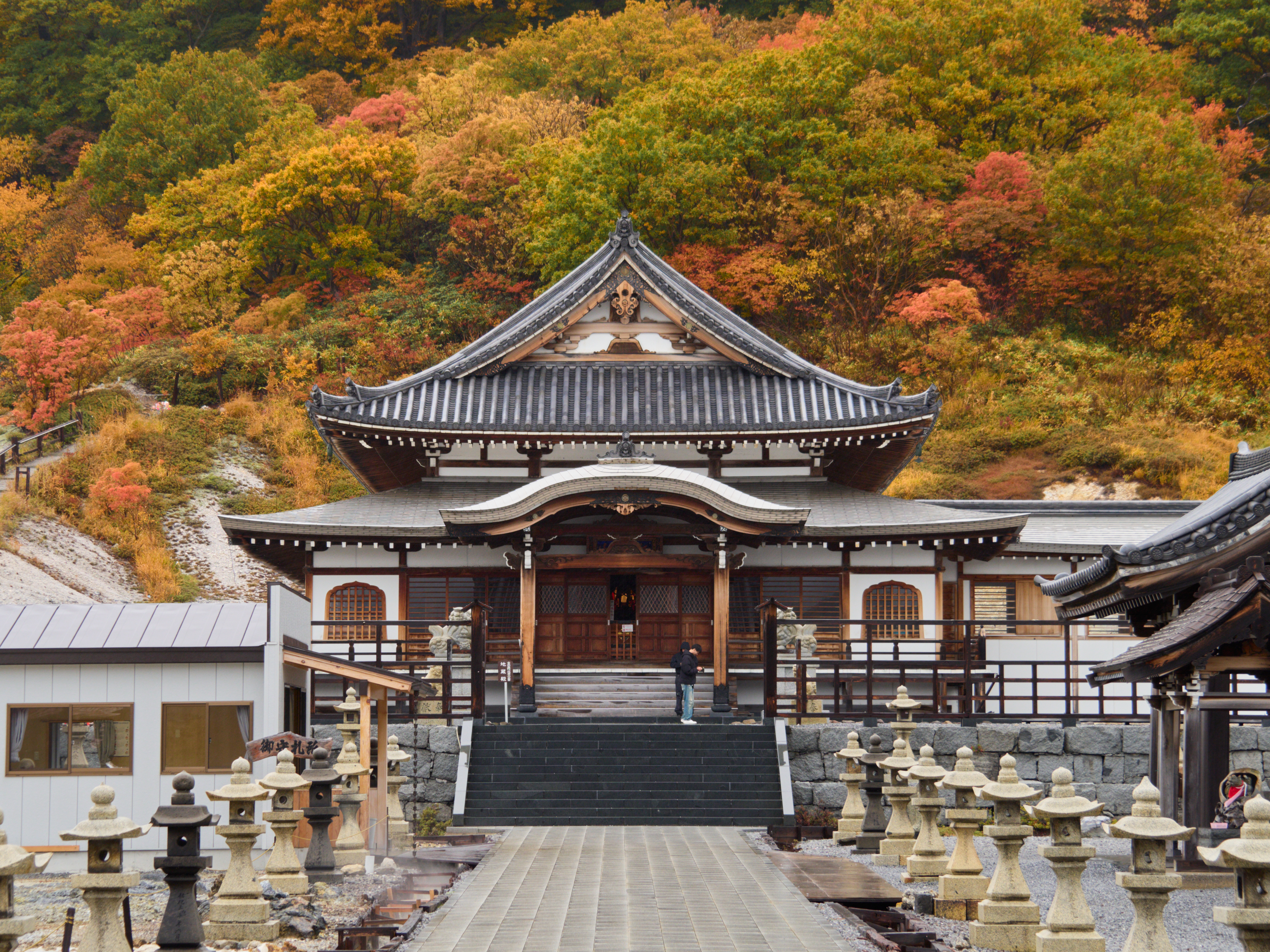
The main hall of Osorezan Bodaiji temple in autumn.

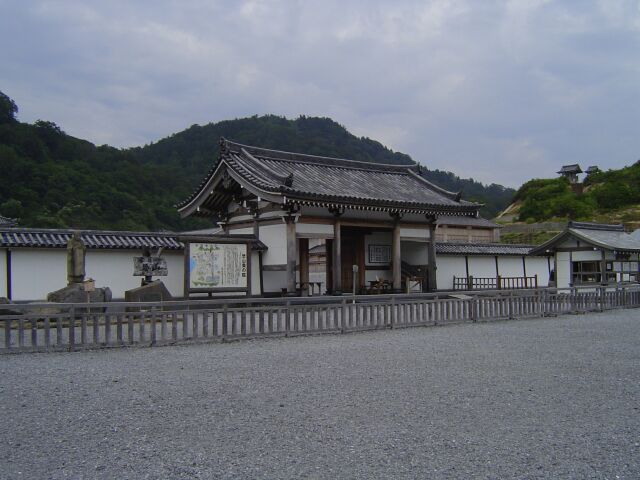
Sōmon gate of Bodai-ji

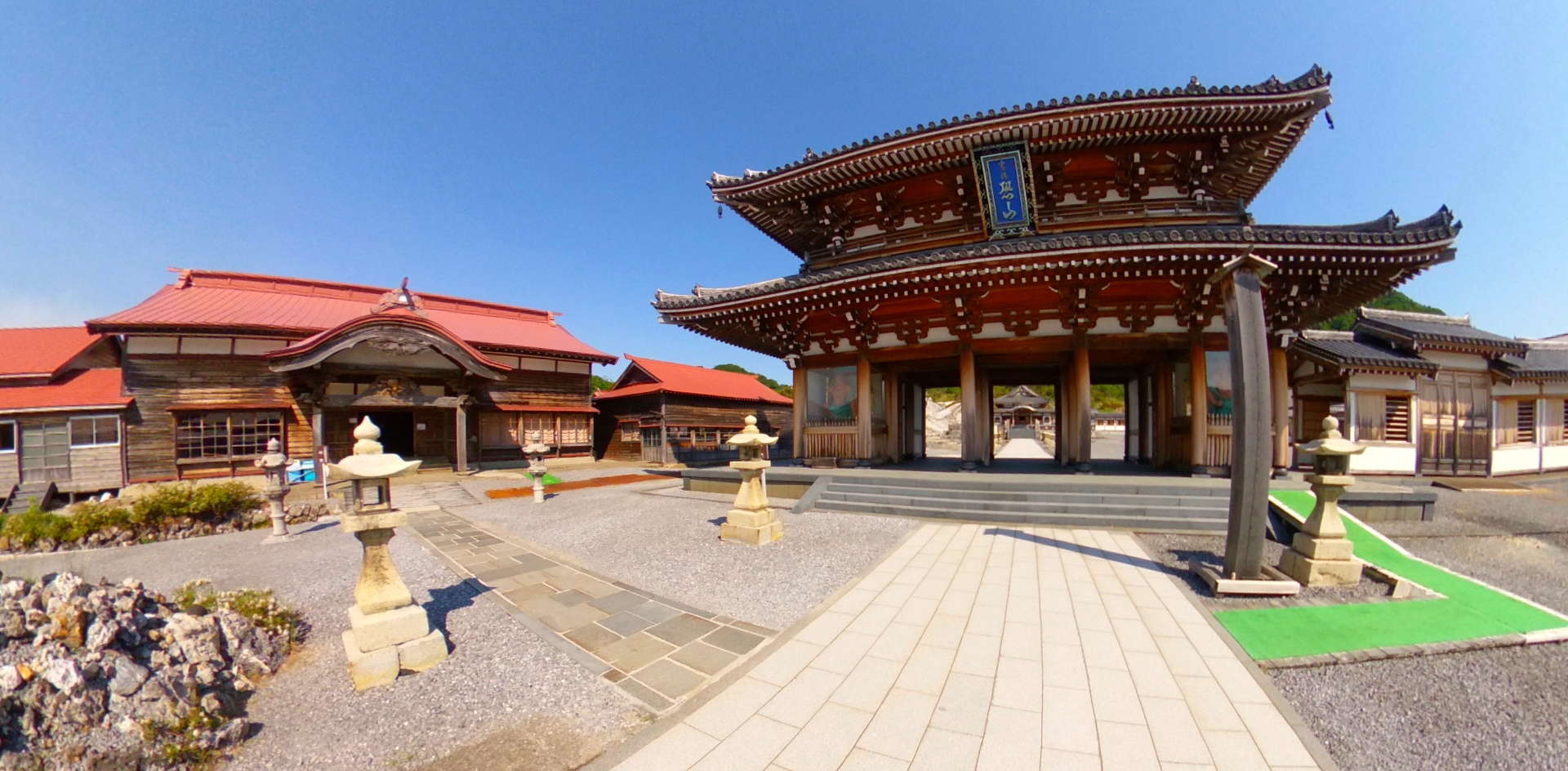
Sammon gate of Bodai-ji

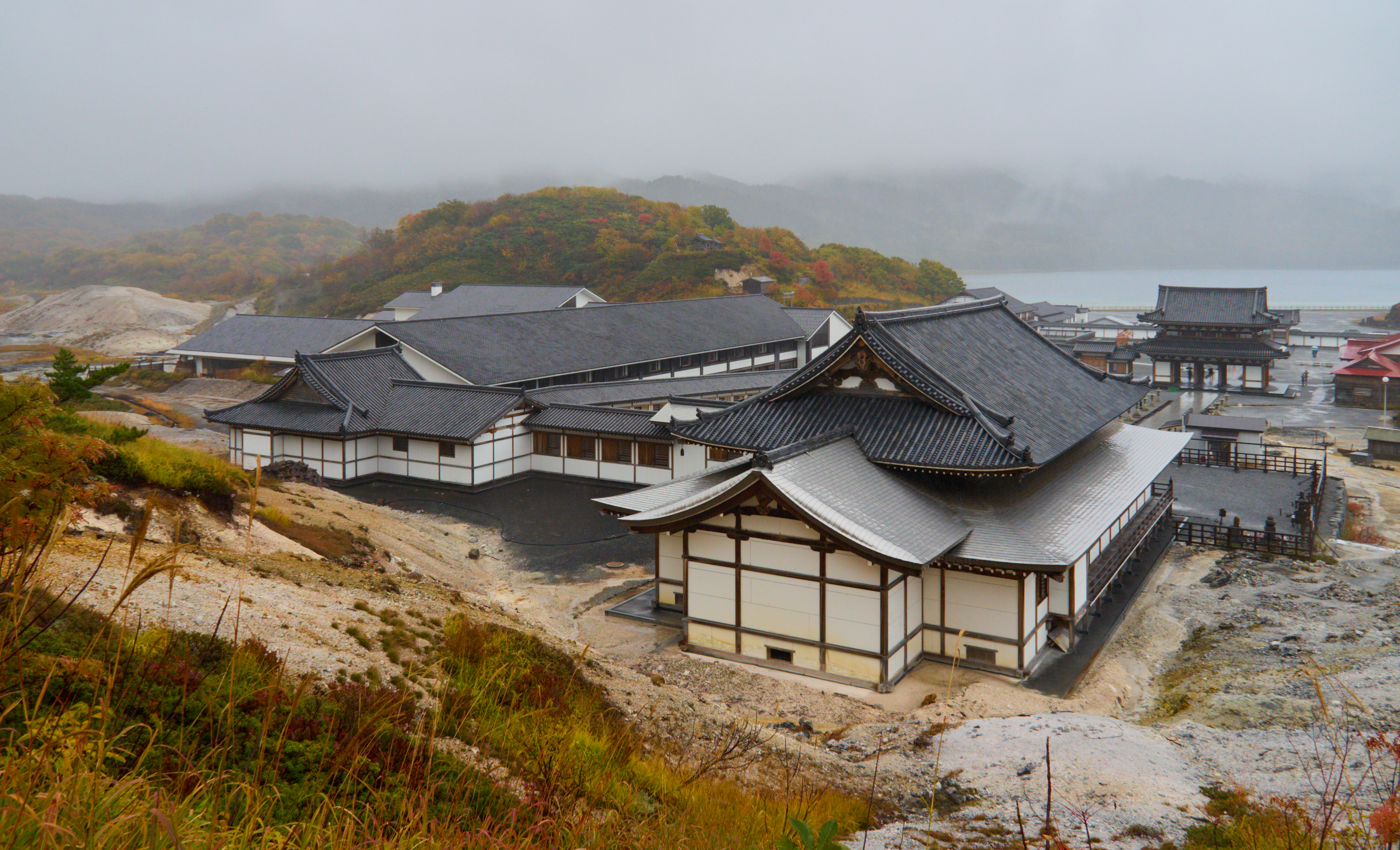
Temple complex buildings at Osorezan, in autumn.

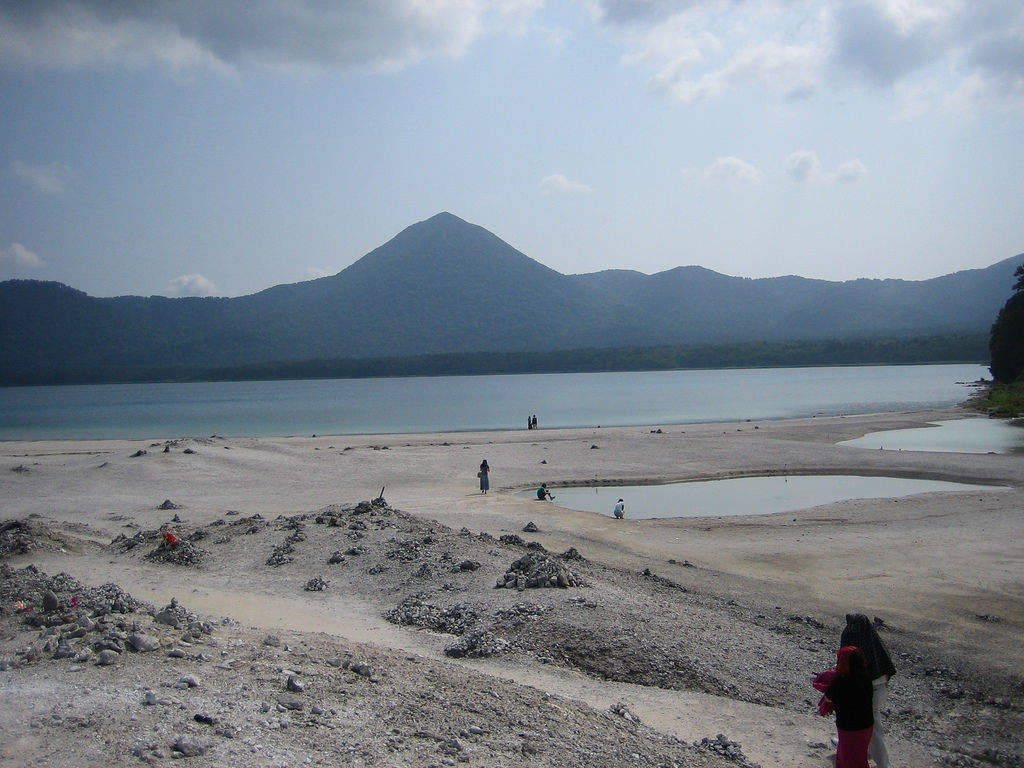
Lake Usori

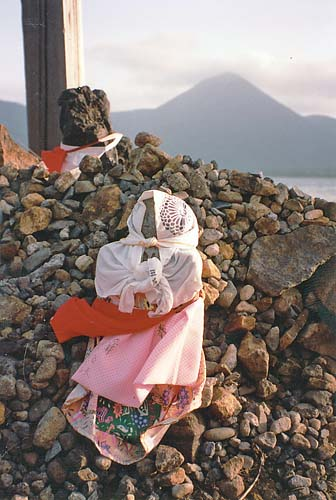
Effigy of a child

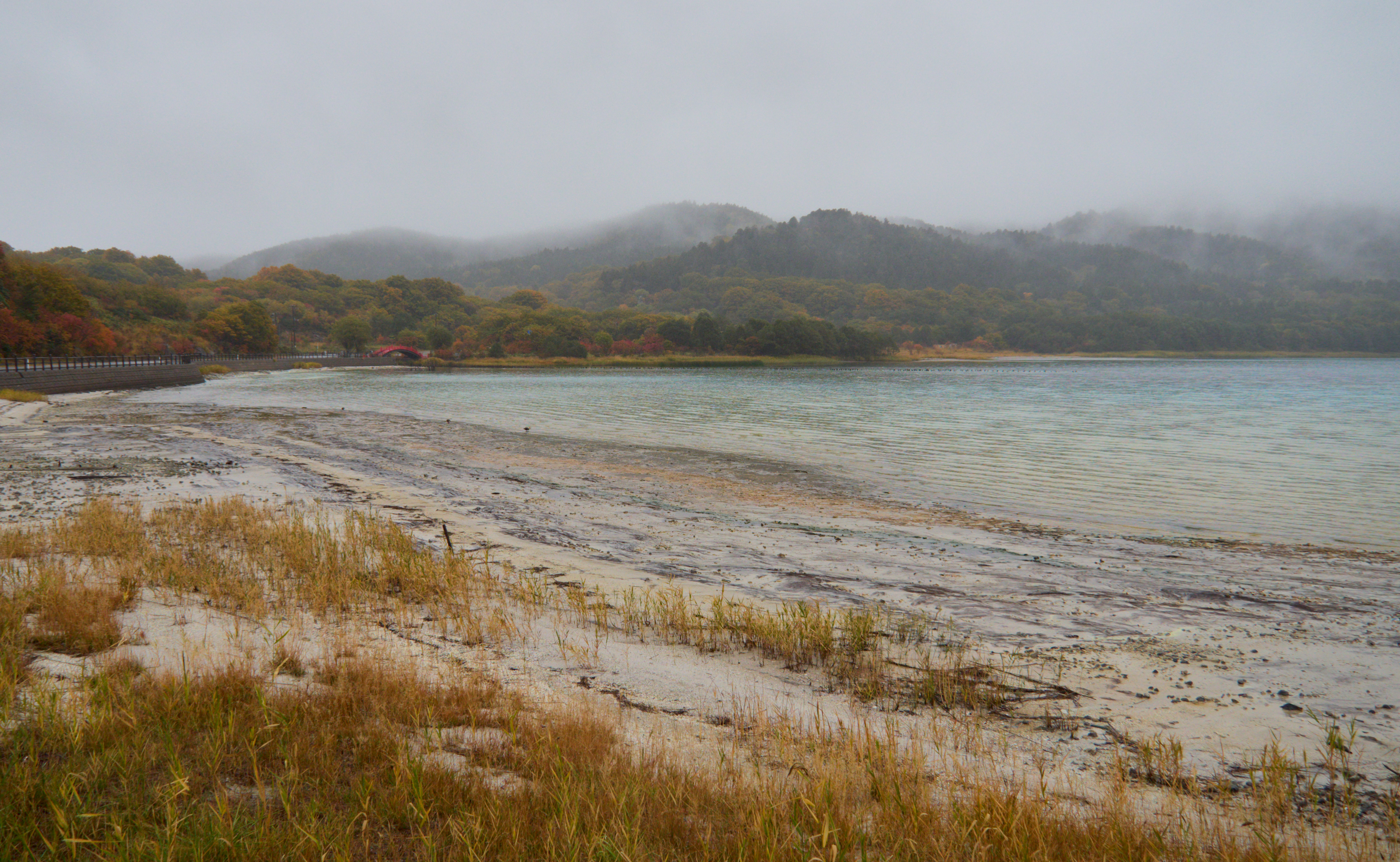
Sandy shoreline of Lake Usoriyama at Osorezan.
