= Fukushima Prefectural Museum of Art =

Museum in Japan

Coordinates: 37°46′4.5″N 140°27′23.5″E

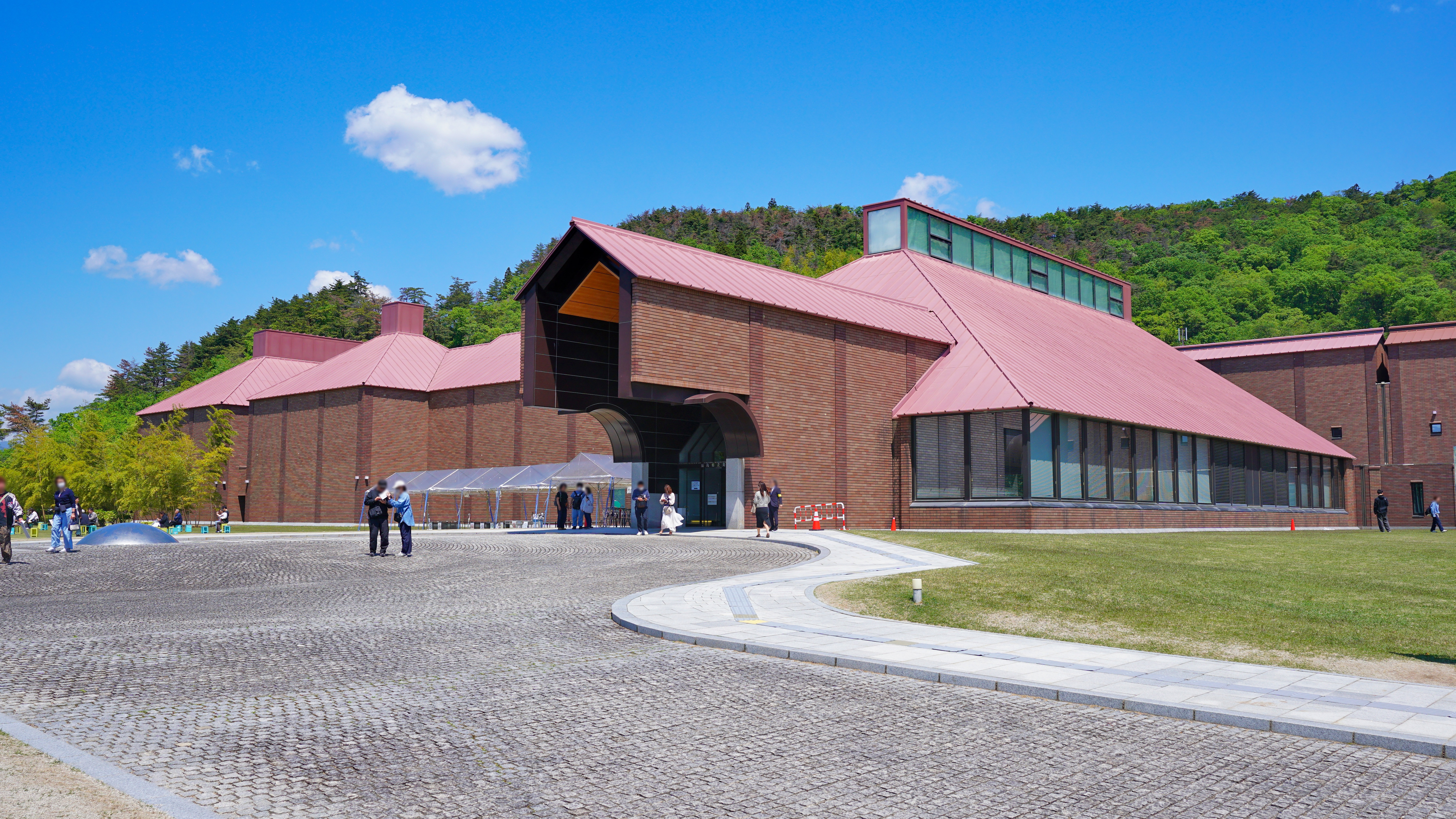
- Exterior
- Established: July 1984
- Location: Fukushima City, Japan
- Website: Official website

Fukushima Prefectural Museum of Art (福島県立美術館, Fukushima Kenritsu Bijutsukan) is a museum located in Fukushima City, at the base of Mount Shinobu. It shares a campus of over 60,000 square meters with Fukushima Prefectural Library. The two facilities were established together in July, 1984. However, the museum maintains its own grounds and gardens, separate from the library.

The museum houses nearly 4,000 works by both local and world famous artists. French Impressionist paintings by Claude Monet and Paul Gauguin are among the museum's collection, as are modern Japanese paintings by Sekine Shoji and Kishida Ryusei. The museum also houses works of 20th century American realism, prints, Earthenware, ceramic art, and textiles.

The museum owns an important part of Ben Shahn's Lucky Dragon series, about the Daigo Fukuryū Maru (literally, Lucky Dragon No. 5), the Japanese fishing boat caught in the Bikini Atoll hydrogen bomb blast.

== History ==
In May 1977, a meeting was held for citizens of the prefecture to "consider matters of culture." In the months following this meeting, a survey on the topic was distributed throughout the prefecture.

Further action was not taken until January 1978, when a report encouraging the promotion of prefectural culture was delivered to the governor. About one year later, in February 1979, another report, this time containing a plan for the promotion of prefectural culture was delivered to the governor. Regulations regarding funding the maintenance of cultural facilities were established the following month and in June of the same year, an investigative committee with ten members was created to plan the foundation of the Fukushima Prefectural Museum of Art. Regulations regarding funding the acquisition of art were established that December.

In January 1980, the committee issued a report detailing a plan for the foundation of the museum to the governor. It was decided in February that the museum and library would be located within Fukushima City. That same month the artist Kiyoshi Saitō donated 227 pieces of his own work to the prefecture.

It was decided in April 1980 that the museum would be located at the former site of the Fukushima College Economics Department.

The first purchases of art on behalf of the museum were decided on in May 1980 and included the painting "Pine Baron" (Japanese: 松ぼっくり男爵) by Andrew Wyeth.

Following over a year of planning, construction of the museum began in July 1982 and was completed in March 1984. The museum opened its doors to the public for the first time on July 22, 1984.

In June 1995, the museum surpassed one million visitors.

In April 1998, 67,125 people visited the museum for an exhibition of the work of Pablo Picasso.

In September 1999, the museum's 100th exhibition was held commemorating the 100th birthday of Sekine Shoji. The following month, the museum's official website was created.

77,601 people visited the museum in July 2004 for an exhibition titled "Art of Star Wars."

In May 2006, the museum surpassed two million visitors.

64,700 people visited the museum in September 2010 for an exhibition about ancient Egypt. In February of the following year, 74,378 people visited for an exhibition of artwork from Studio Ghibli.

The museum closed between March 12 and April 15, 2011 as a result of damage caused by the 2011 Tōhoku earthquake and tsunami.

In May 2011, the museum surpassed three million visitors.

In September 2013, 155,592 people visited for an exhibition of the work of Itō Jakuchū.

In April 2016, 104,510 people visited for an exhibition featuring the work of Vermeer and Rembrandt.

In April 2019, 116,344 people visited for an exhibition again featuring the work of Itō Jakuchū.

== See also ==
- Prefectural museum
