= Surikamigawa Dam =

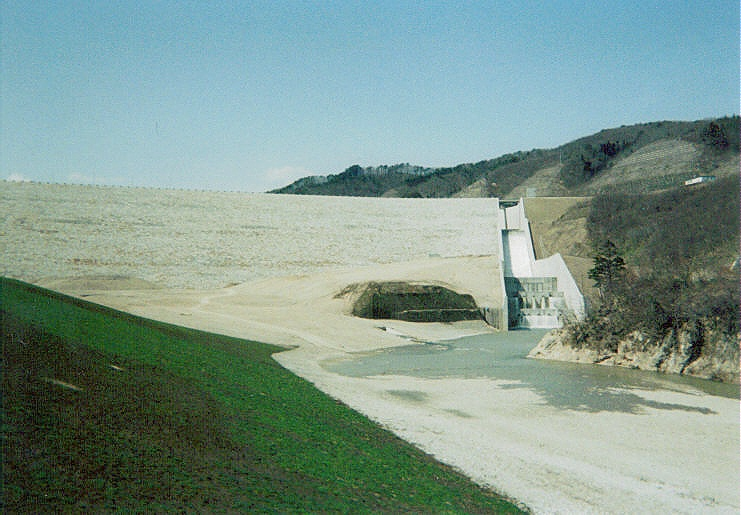
- Southern side of the Surikamigawa Dam
- Official name: 摺上川ダム (Surikamigawa Damu)
- Location: Fukushima City, Fukushima Prefecture, Japan
- Coordinates: 37°55′36″N 140°24′58″E
- Status: Operational
- Opening date: 2006

Dam and spillways
- Type of dam: Embankment dam
- Impounds: Surikamigawa River
- Height: 105.0 m (344.5 ft)
- Length: 718.6 m (2,358 ft)
- Dam volume: 8.3×10^{6} m^{3} (290×10^{6} cu ft)

Reservoir
- Creates: Lake Moniwa (茂庭っ湖, Moniwakko)
- Total capacity: 153×10^{6} m^{3} (5.4×10^{9} cu ft)
- Active capacity: 148×10^{6} m^{3} (5.2×10^{9} cu ft)
- Catchment area: 160.0 km^{2} (61.8 sq mi)
- Surface area: 4.6 km^{2} (1.8 sq mi)
- Maximum water depth: 308.5 m (1,012 ft)

Power Station
- Operator(s): Tohoku Electric Power
- Website; Surikamigawa Dam Official Site

Surikamigawa Dam (摺上川ダム) is a rock-fill dam built on the Surikami River (part of the Abukuma River system) in the Moniwa area of Iizaka, Fukushima, Fukushima Prefecture, Japan. It was opened in 2006 and is administered by the Tohoku Regional Bureau Ministry of Land, Infrastructure and Transport.

== Purpose ==
Surikamigawa Dam is a multipurpose dam, built to provide water to the nearby cities of Nihonmatsu, Fukushima and surrounding areas. It also works in conjunction with Shichikashuku Dam and Miharu Dam to control flooding on the Abukuma River and includes hydroelectric power facilities operated by Tohoku Electric Power.

== History ==
In 1966, Fukushima City released the results of a study on predicted future water demand, recommending the building of a dam on the upper portion of the Surikami River. A preliminary survey was carried out in 1973, and a site was chosen. In the following years various geological surveys and public meetings were held.

In 1982 the Surikamigawa Dam Research Office (摺上川ダム調査事務所, Surikamigawa Damu Chōsa Jimusho) was formed and began development of plans for the construction of the dam.

Residents whose land was located in the area planned to be flooded were moved beginning in April 1991. In October 1992, construction to divert the Surikami River began, and in December 1994 construction on the dam itself commenced. Filling of the embankment was completed in July 2002.

A test fill of the reservoir began on February 19, 2004 and was completed in June of the following year. The dam was fully completed on September 25, 2005.

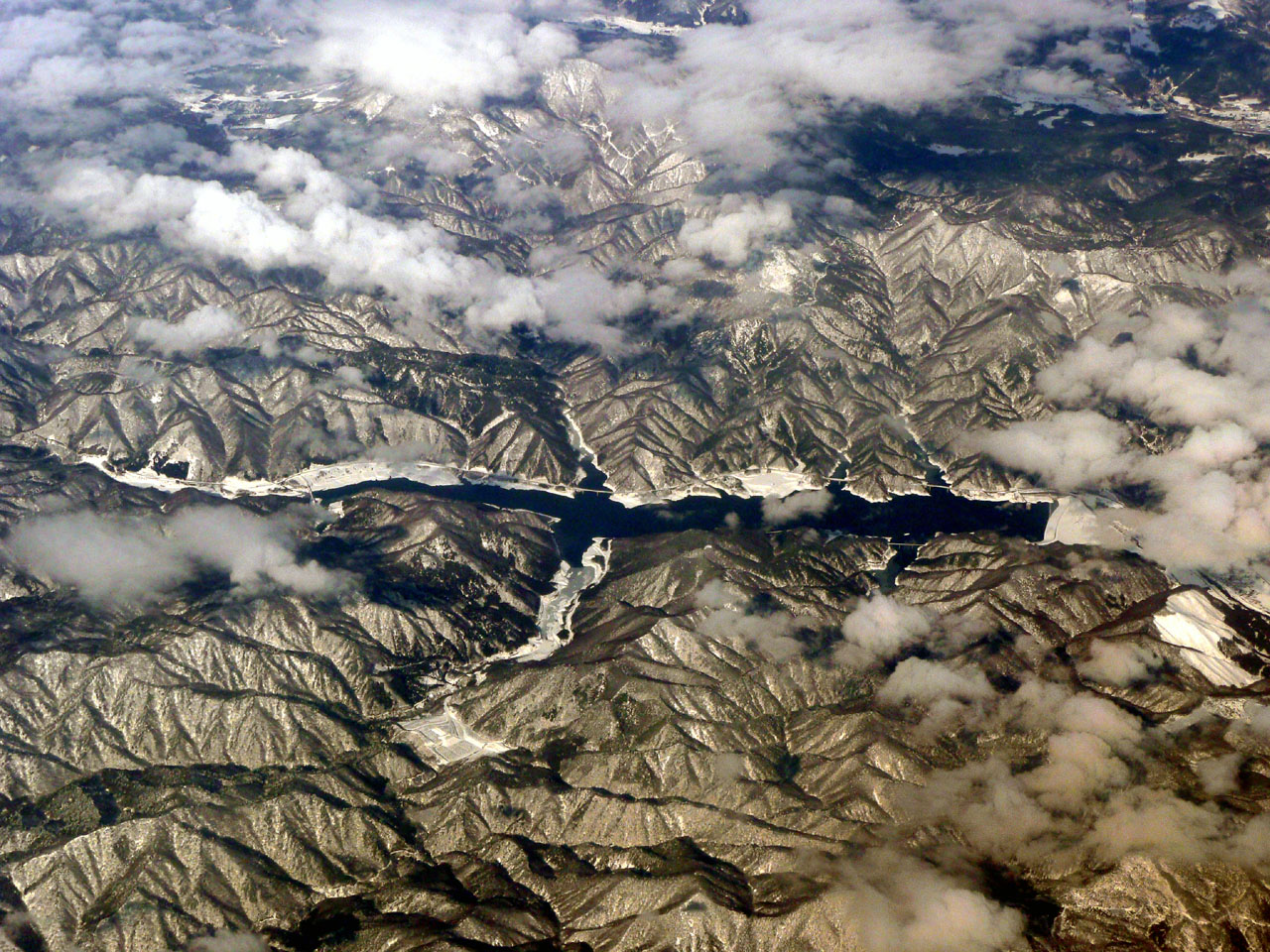
Lake Moniwa in winter.

== Naming ==
The name of the artificial lake the dam forms was chosen from over a thousand ballots cast by the public, with Lake Moniwa (茂庭っ湖, Moniwakko) ultimately being chosen.
