= Daiyu Eight Co Ltd =

Japanese retail company

Daiyu Eight Co. Ltd.
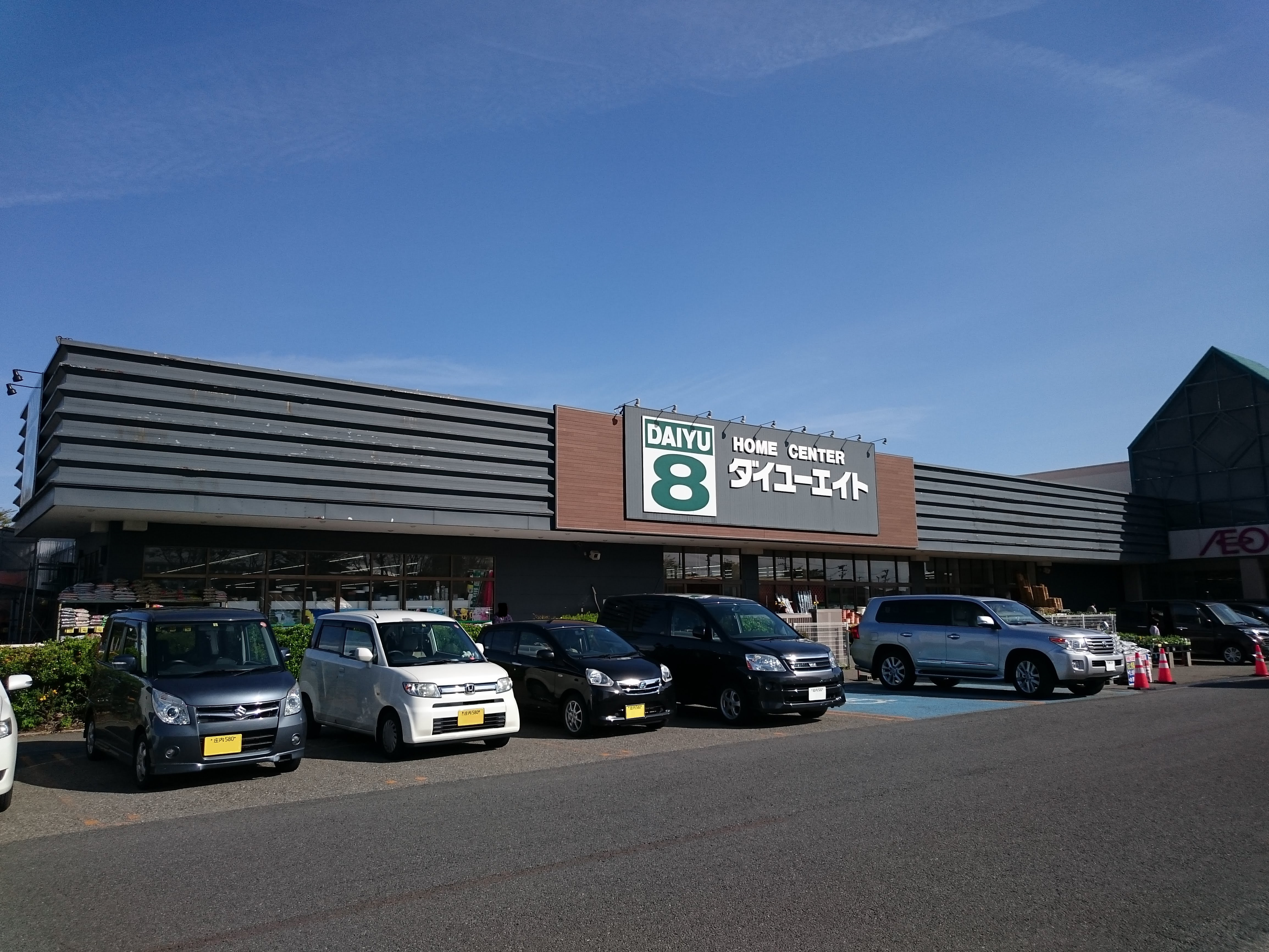
- Daiyu 8 in Sakata, Yamagata
- Native name: 株式会社 ダイユーエイト
- Romanized name: Kabushikigaisha Daiyu Eito
- Formerly: Asakura Inc.
- Website: www.daiyu8.co.jp

Daiyu Eight Co Ltd (Japanese: 株式会社ダイユーエイト) is a Japanese company that operates home-improvement stores carrying items such as furniture, gardening tools, etc, as well as a chain of office supply stores. These stores are mainly located in the prefectures of Fukushima, Miyagi, and Yamagata. The current president and representative director of the company is Shunichi Asakura.

== History ==
- 1976 - Established as Asakura Inc. (アサクラ設立) in Fukushima City.
- 1976 - Opened first store, "Daiyu Eight Fukushima" (ダイユー8福島店), in Fukushima City.
- 1977 - Changed name from Asakura Inc. to Daiyu Eight (ダイユーエイト).
- 1991 - Moved headquarters and named the new building the "main office / distribution center (Fukushima distribution center)" (本部・流通センター（福島流通センター）).
- 1996 - Opened the company's first office supplies store "Office Eight South Fukushima" (オフィスエイト南福島店) in Fukushima City.
- 2000 - Registered with the Japan Securities Dealers Association (日本証券業協会).
- 2001 - Established a second distribution center, "Kaminagura Distribution Center" (上名倉流通センター) in Fukushima City.
- 2002 - Established what would become the flagship store, "Daiyu Eight Fukushima Kuroiwa" (ダイユーエイト福島黒岩店) in Fukushima City.
- 2003 - Established a large shopping center, "Eight Town Motomiya" (エイトタウン本宮) in Motomiya City, Fukushima Prefecture.
- 2006 - Listed in the second section of the Tokyo Stock Exchange.
- 2007 - Listed in the first section of the Tokyo Stock Exchange.
- 2008 - In an effort to optimize distribution and decrease costs, the center of distribution was moved to the "Tenei Fukushima Distribution Center," in Tenei, Fukushima Prefecture.
- 2010 - Established "Daiyu Eight MAX Fukushima" (ダイユーエイトMAX福島店) in Fukushima City.
- 2011 - Established "One's Cycle South Fukushima" (ワンズサイクル南福島店), the company's first bicycle specialty shop, in Fukushima City.
- 2012 - Opened first shop in Akita Prefecture, "Daiyu Eight Akita Katagami" (ダイユーエイト秋田潟上店) in Katagami City.
- 2013 - Opened first shop in Iwate Prefecture, "Daiyu Eight Iwate Mizusawa" (ダイユーエイト岩手水沢店) in Ōshū City.
- 2016 - Daiyu Eight and LIC Co. merged, creating Daiyu LIC Holdings Co., Ltd.
- 2018 - Established stores in Sakura City, Tochigi Prefecture., in Nasushiobara City, Tochigi Prefecture. and Kitakata City, Fukushima Prefecture.
- 2019 - Established store Minamisōma City, Fukushima Prefecture.
- 2019 - Moved and expanded "Daiyu Eight Yashimada." Established new flagship store "Daiyu Eight West Fukushima" (ダイユーエイト福島西店) in Minamisawamata, Fukushima City.

In January 2016, the company announced that it would resume business at its former location in Tomioka, Fukushima, a town heavily impacted by the 2011 Tōhoku earthquake and tsunami. Initially, the goal was to reopen in April of the following year. In June 2016, the company aimed to reopen in November 2017 ahead of the town's scheduled repatriation in April. However, according to the company's website, the site remains closed.

Daiyu Eight locations in Iwaki and Asakawa were also flooded during the 2011 Tōhoku earthquake and tsunami. In October, 2019, the company announced plans to reopen these stores; Asakawa in November 2019 and Iwaki in December 2019.

On May 12, 2020, President Asakura led the opening ceremony of an internet-based product distribution center in Kuroiwa, Fukushima City. The warehouse is said to be about ten times larger than previous locations. The number of staff was also increased, from twenty to thirty personnel. In response to the coronavirus pandemic, President Asakura expressed that he would like to expand the company's online functions.

The company expanded its "One Cycle" franchise in 2020 with the establishment of "One's Cycle Fukushima Moriai" (ワンズサイクル福島森合店) in Fukushima City.

In 2021, Daiyu Eight Co Ltd opened three more stores; "Office Eight Yamagata Hakusan" (オフィスエイト山形白店) in Yamagata City, Yamagata Prefecture; "One's Cycle Fukushima Kamata" (ワンズサイクル福島鎌田店) in Fukushima City; "Daiyu Eight Iwaki Yumoto" (ダイユーエイトいわき湯本店) in Iwaki City, Fukushima Prefecture.
