= Sakura no Seibo Junior College =

Higher education institution in Fukushima Prefecture, Japan

Coordinates: 37°45′47″N 140°28′23.2″E

- 桜の聖母短期大学
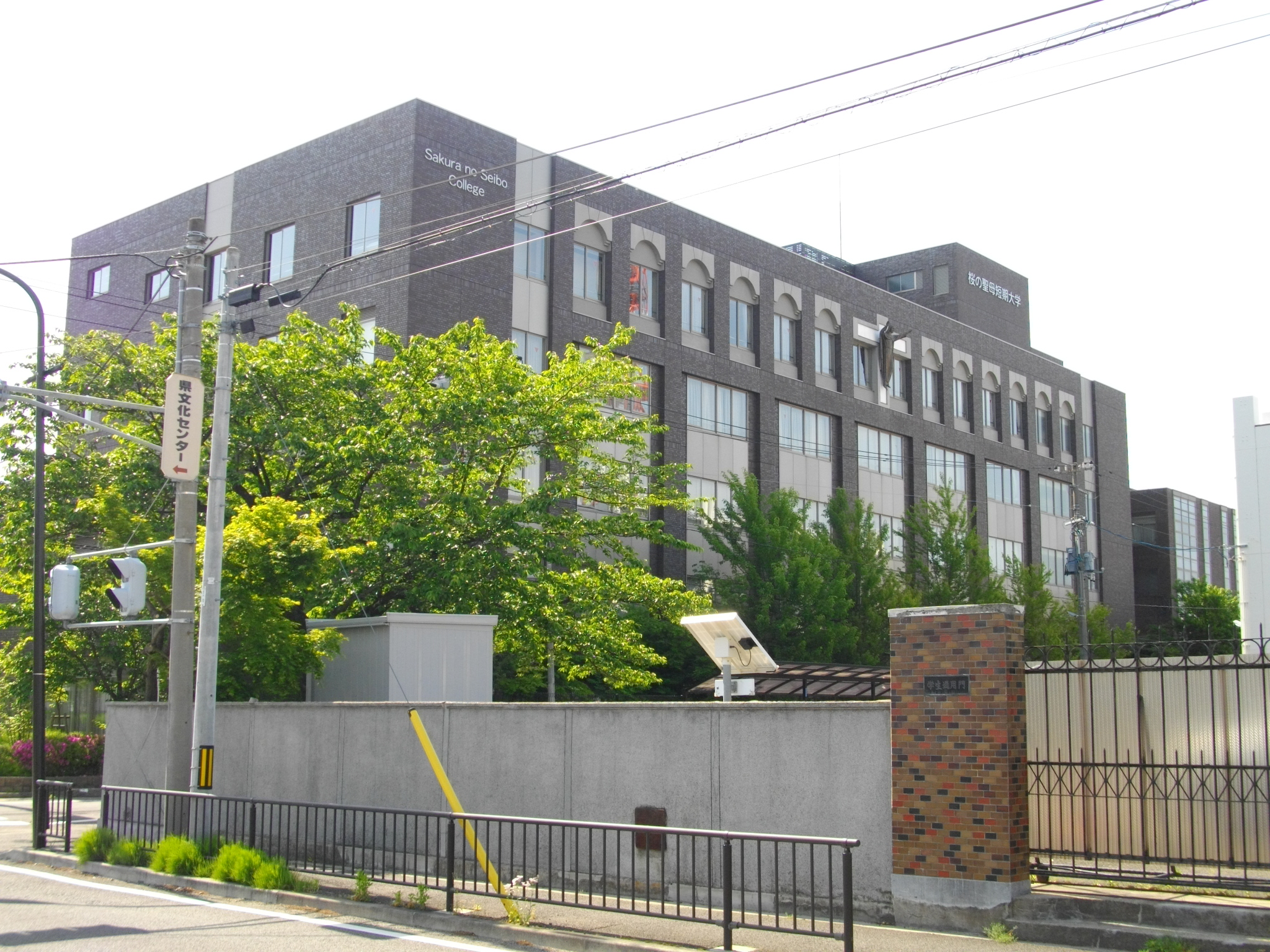
- Type: Private
- Established: 1955
- Affiliations: Roman Catholic Church
- Location: Fukushima, Fukushima, Japan
- Website: http://www.sakuranoseibo.jp/

Sakura no Seibo Junior College (桜の聖母短期大学, Sakura no seibo tanki daigaku) is a private junior college, located in the city of Fukushima, Japan. The school is affiliated with the Roman Catholic Church.

== History ==
The Sakura no Seibo was established in 1955 as a women's junior college specializing in home economics.

The school was reorganized in 2003 as part of the Ministry of Education's Distinctive University Support Program.

It has been affiliated with the Congregation of Notre Dame of Montreal from the Netherlands since 2008.

== Organization ==
The school offers qualification programs for nursery teachers, dietitians, librarians, kindergarten teaching, junior high school teaching as well as nutrition teaching.

Decisions include -

- School of Life Science
  - Department of Food & Nutrition
  - Department of Child welfare
- School of English language
