= Fukushima College =

Coordinates: 37°45′11.3″N 140°27′51.6″E

- 福島学院大学
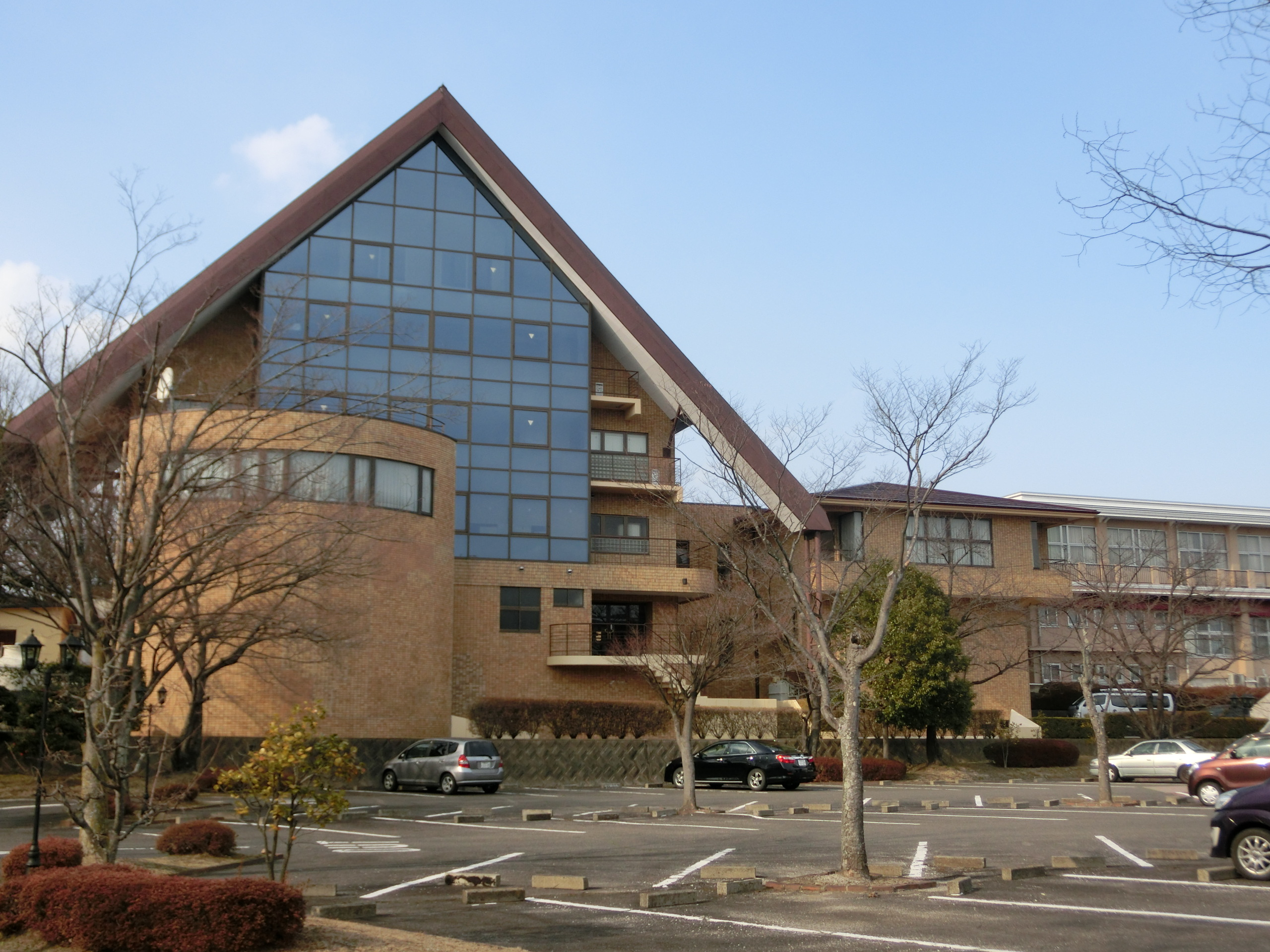
- Fukushima College Miyashiro Campus
- Type: Private
- Established: 1941
- Location: Fukushima, Fukushima, Japan
- Website: http://www.fukushima-college.com/

Fukushima College (福島学院大学, Fukushima Gakuin Daigaku) is a private university, located in the city of Fukushima, Japan.

== History ==
The predecessor of Fukushima College was opened as a Higher Dressmaking School in 1941. It became the Midorigaoka Women's Junior College in 1966 and was renamed the Fukushima Women's Junior College in 1968. In 2000, the college became coeducational, and was renamed the Fukushima Gakuen Junior College. In 2003, the school was renamed Fukushima College. The associate Fukushima College Junior College was opened in 2004.

== Academic Departments and Facilities ==
=== Graduate ===
- Graduate School of Clinical Psychology

=== Undergraduate ===
- Department of Social Welfare and Psychology
