= Akaiwa Station =

Former railway station in Fukushima, Fukushima Prefecture, Japan

Akaiwa Station 赤岩駅
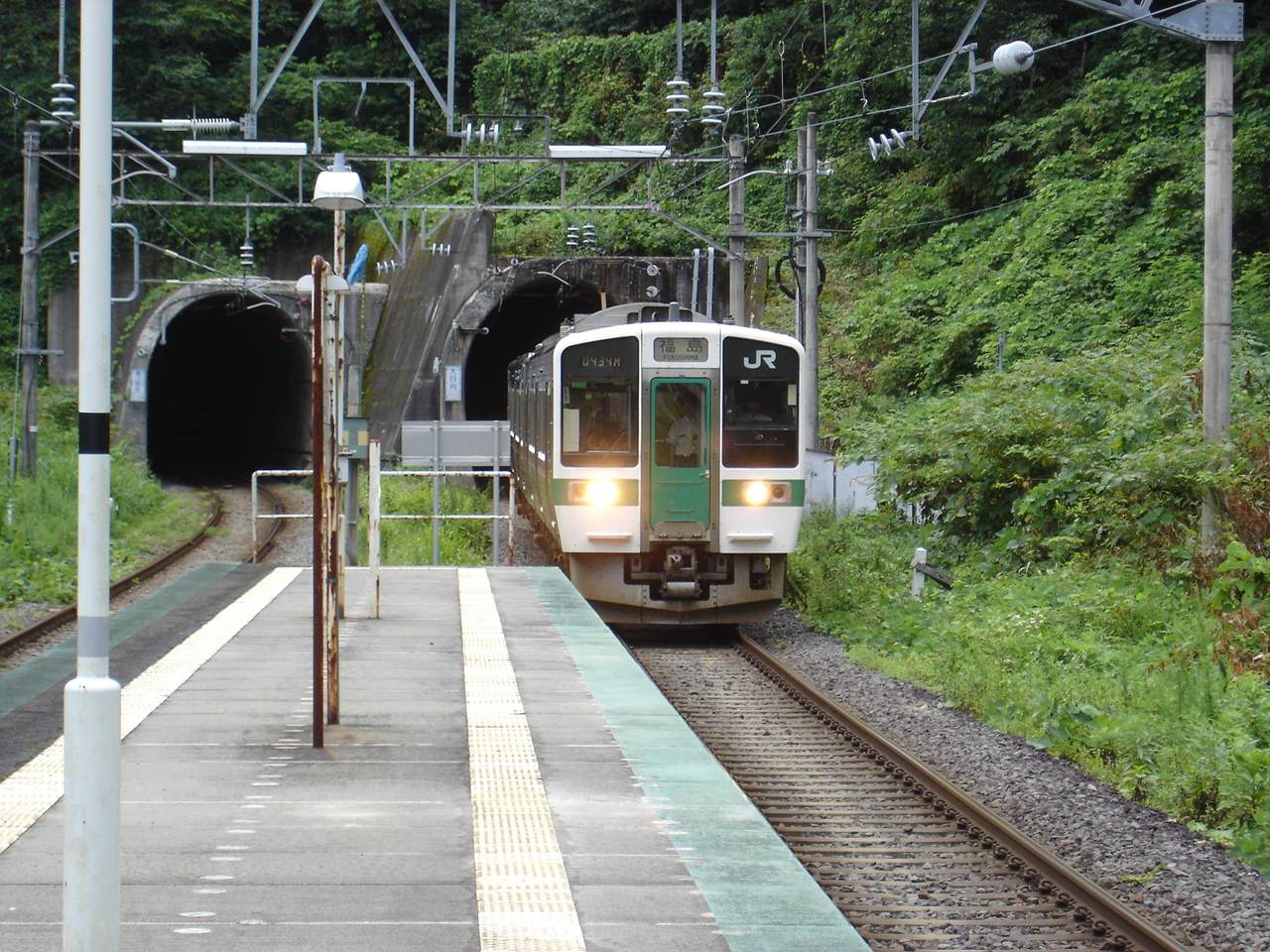
- Akaiwa Station in August 2006

General information
- Location: Akaiwa, Ōzasō, Fukushima-shi, Fukushima-ken 960-0251; Japan
- Coordinates: 37°48′21″N 140°20′07″E
- Operator: JR East
- Line: ■ Ōu Main Line
- Distance: 14.6 km from Fukushima
- Platforms: 1 island platform
- Tracks: 2

Other information
- Status: Unstaffed
- Website: Official website

History
- Opened: 13 October 1910
- Closed: 13 March 2021
Location
- Location within Fukushima Prefecture Location within Japan

Akaiwa Station (赤岩駅, Akaiwa-eki) is a disused railway station on the Ōu Main Line in the city of Fukushima, Fukushima Prefecture, Japan, operated by East Japan Railway Company (JR East). Services ended on 4 March 2017. The station was discontinued on 13 March 2021.

== Lines ==
Akaiwa Station was served by the Ōu Main Line (Yamagata Line), and is located 14.6 km from the starting point of the line at Fukushima.

== Services ==
The station used to be served by six services in each direction daily, but beginning in December 2012, no trains stopped at the station during the winter period between December and March. The station was abolished on 13 March 2021.

== Station layout ==
The station was unstaffed and consisted of an unnumbered island platform serving two tracks. The platform could be accessed from the station building via a level crossing.

=== Platforms ===
Entrance side	■ Ou Main Line (Yamagata Line)	for Fukushima
Opposite side	■ Ou Main Line (Yamagata Line)	for Yamagata and Yonezawa

== Adjacent stations ==
«	Service	»
Ōu Main Line (Yamagata Line)
Niwasaka	Local	Itaya

== History ==
Akaiwa Station opened on 13 October 1910. The station was absorbed into the JR East network upon the privatization of Japanese National Railways (JNR) on 1 April 1987.

From 1 December 2012, trains stopped serving this station during the winter period (until 25 March 2013). Services stopped completely on 4 March 2017.

The station discontinued on 13 March 2021 due to timetable revision.

== Surrounding area ==
The station was located in an isolated mountainous area on the Fukushima side of the Itaya Pass.

== See also ==
- List of railway stations in Japan
