= Fukushima Bank =

Japanese bank

The Fukushima Bank Ltd.
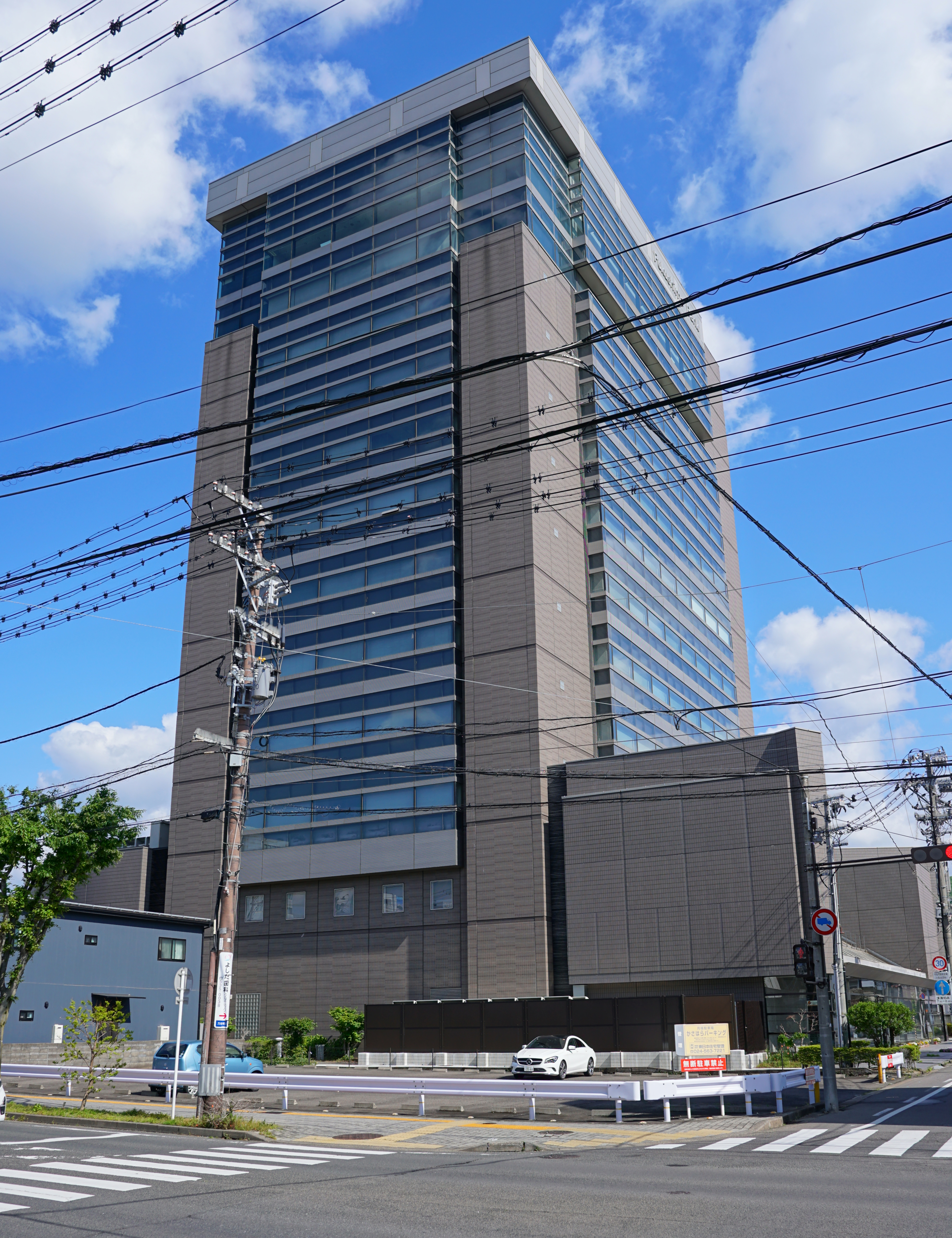
- Main office of Fukushima Bank
- Trade name: Fukushima Bank
- Native name: 株式会社福島銀行
- Romanized name: Fukushima Ginkou
- Company type: Public
- Key people: Takahiro Kato (CEO & Board Member); Akinori Sato (Board Member); Takashi Yanai (Board Member); Toshihiko Sato (Board Member); Akira Koketsu (Board Member)
- Number of employees: 568

The Fukushima Bank Ltd. (株会社福島銀行 Kabushiki-gaisha Fukushima Ginkō) is a Japanese regional bank headquartered in Fukushima City, Fukushima Prefecture, Japan. Founded on November 27, 1922, the company provides banking (deposits, loans, foreign exchange trading, etc.) and leasing services as well as credit card and credit guarantee services. President and CEO, Takahiro Kato denies any intent to merge with Toho Bank Ltd., another regional bank located in Fukushima Prefecture.

== History ==
Established in 1922 as Yumoto Shinkin Mujin Co., Ltd. (湯本信用無尽株式会社), the bank was originally located in the Yumoto neighborhood of Iwaki City, on the South-Eastern coast of Fukushima Prefecture. In November 1932, the bank absorbed Fukushima Mujin Co., Ltd.(福島無尽株式会社), renamed to Fukushima Mujin Bank Co., Ltd.(株式会社福島無 金庫), and moved the main office to Kamimachi, in Fukushima City. The company changed names again, to Fukushima Mutual Bank Ltd.(株式会社福島相互銀行) following the enforcement of the 1951 Mutual Bank Act (相互銀行法). The main office relocated to a then new building in Honmachi, Fukushima City, in January 1955.

The company began online banking in April 1976. A second online system was launched ten years later, in 1986, followed by a third in 1991.

Also in 1986, the company began facilitating foreign currency exchanges.

== Community Involvement ==
- Employees of the company participate in Fukushima City's Waraji Festival.
- The company hosts workshops to help children learn computer skills.
- The company hosts an annual exhibition and sale of goods handcrafted by people with disabilities (障がい者施設製品の大展示即売会 Shougai-sha Shisetsu Seihin no Otenjisokubai-kai).
- The company donates to a number of projects and non-profit organizations in support of preserving the natural environment of Fukushima.
- Under the title "Fukushima Bank Old Stories," the company attributed to a project aiming to promote the culture of Fukushima Prefecture. Four traditional Japanese storytelling performances were held and DVD copies were distributed to elementary schools throughout the prefecture.
- The company donates proceeds from their vending machines to support the victims of violent crimes.
- A light display is set up at the company's main office every winter season.
