= Mount Shinobu =

Mountain in the country of Japan

Mt. Shinobu
- 信夫山
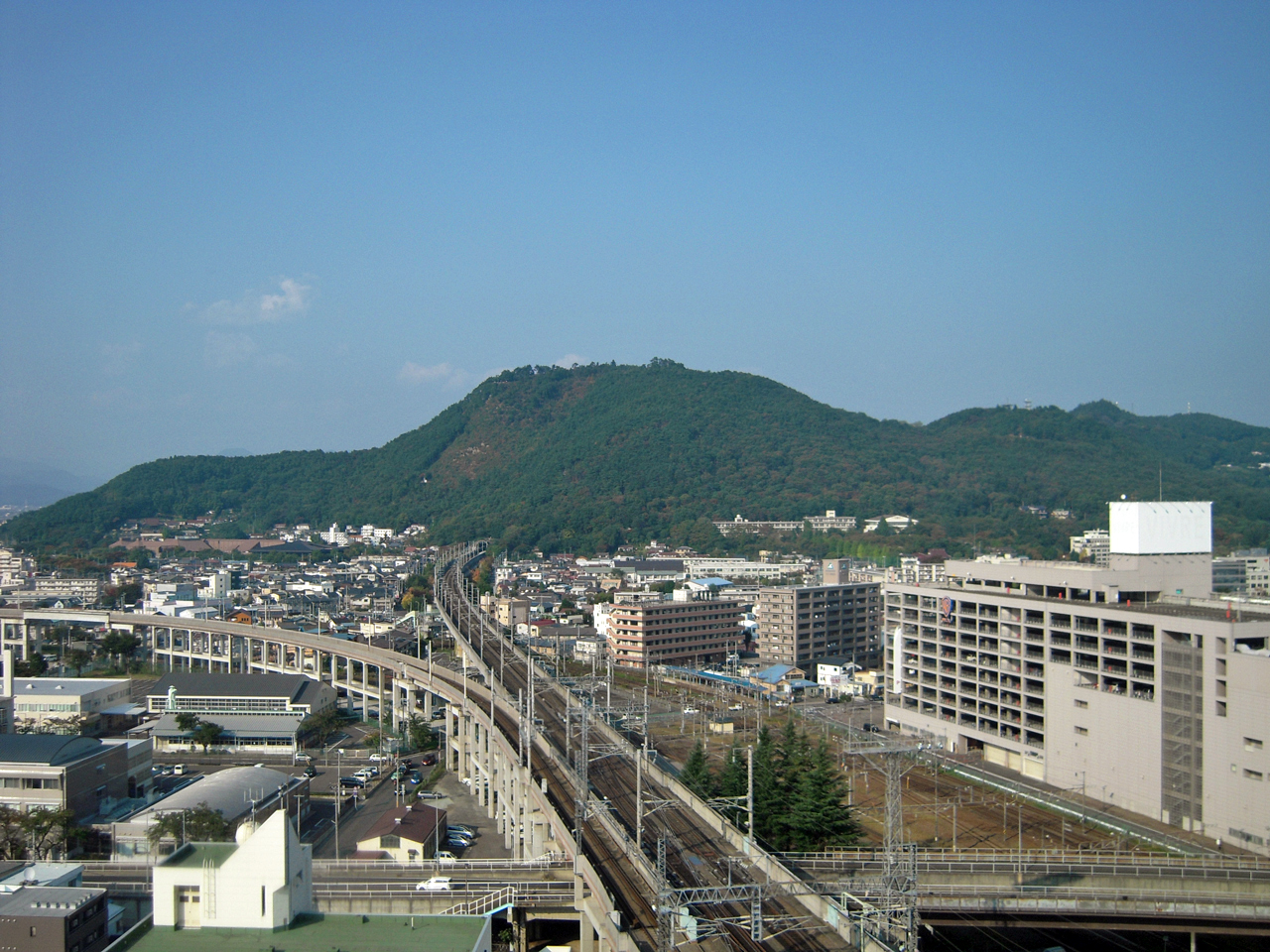
- Mt. Shinobu's southern side, as viewed from directly south of Fukushima Station, October 2008

Highest point
- Elevation: 275 m (902 ft)
- Coordinates: 37°46′33.7″N 140°28′27.5″E

Geography
- Location within Japan
- Location: Fukushima, Fukushima, Japan

Mt. Shinobu (信夫山, Shinobu-yama) is a 275-meter monadnock located in the center of Fukushima, Fukushima, Japan.

== Geography ==
Mt. Shinobu rises 275 meters from the surrounding flat Fukushima Basin. The mountain has three main peaks: Mt. Ha (羽山, Ha-yama) is on the western part of the mountain and is the tallest peak at 275 meters, Mt. Haguro (羽黒山, Haguro-san) is in the center and tops out at 260 meters, and Mt. Kumano (熊野山, Kumano-san) is a 268-meter peak in the east. In addition to the three main peaks, there are also the smaller peaks of Mt. Tatsuishi (立石山, Tatsuishi-yama), which is north of Mt. Kumano and stands at 220 meters, and Tengunomori (天狗の森), which is a 183-meter peak on the southeast of the mountain.

Mt. Shinobu is 2.7 km long from east to west, 1.4 km wide from south to north, and has a circumference of seven kilometers.
