= Sakuramizu Station =

Railway station in Fukushima, Fukushima Prefecture, Japan

Sakuramizu Station 桜水駅
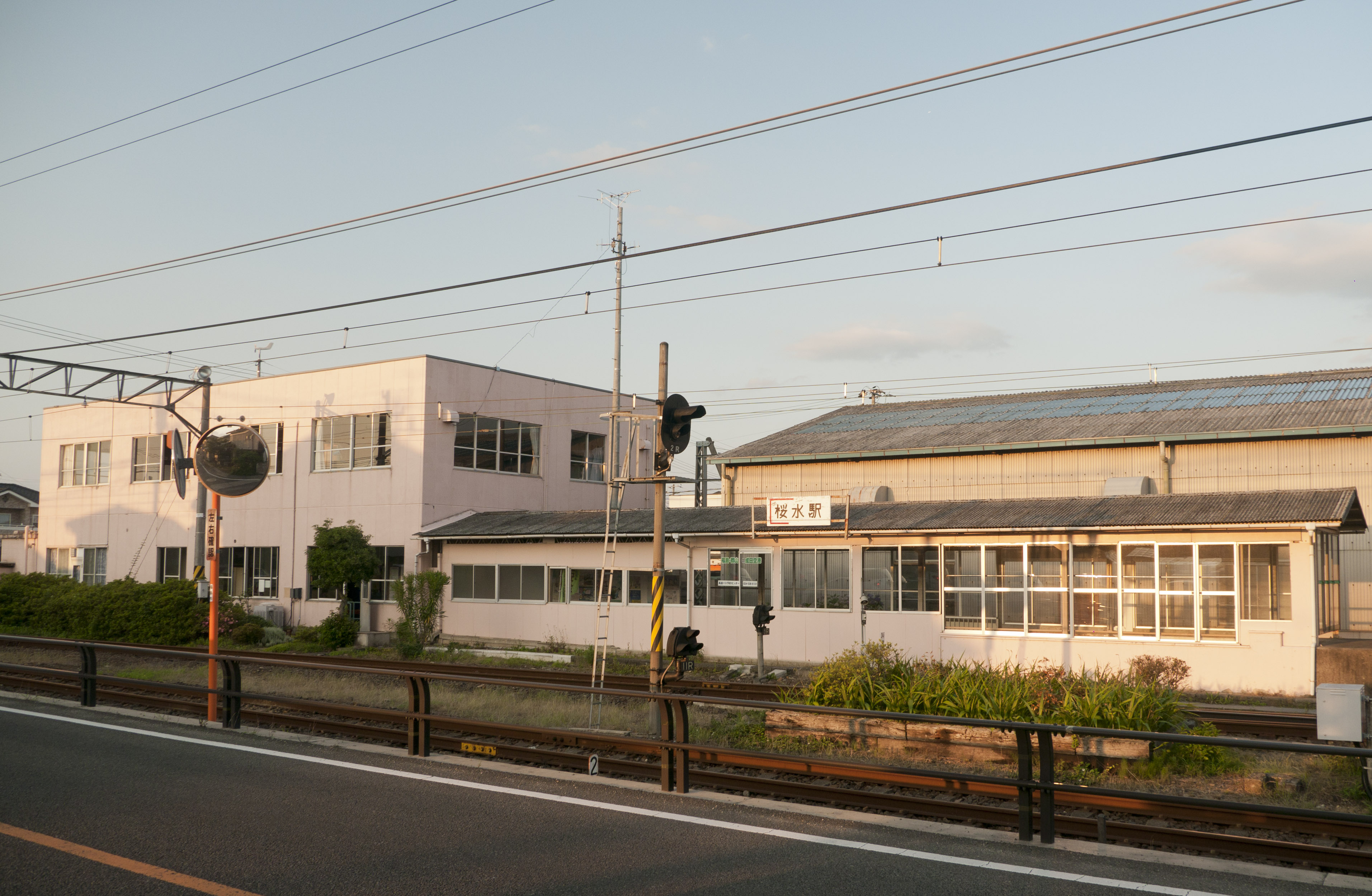
- Sakuramizu Station building

General information
- Location: 2-5, Sasaya Aza Koyamae; Fukushima; Japan
- Coordinates: 37°47′48″N 140°26′29″E
- Operator: Fukushima Transportation
- Distance: 5.1 km (3.2 mi) from Fukushima
- Platforms: 1 island platform
- Tracks: 2

Construction
- Structure type: At-grade

Other information
- Status: Staffed
- Website: Official website

History
- Opened: 20 August 1975

Services
Preceding station	Fukushima Transportation	Following station
Sasaya towards Fukushima	Iizaka Line	Hirano towards Iizaka Onsen
Location
- Location within Fukushima Prefecture Location within Japan

Sakuramizu Station (Japanese: 桜水駅, Hepburn: Sakuramizu eki) is a railway station in the city of Fukushima, Fukushima Prefecture, Japan operated by Fukushima Kōtsū.

== Lines ==
Sakuramizu Station is served by the Iizaka Line and is located 5.1 kilometres (3.2 mi) from the starting point of the line at Fukushima.

== Station layout ==
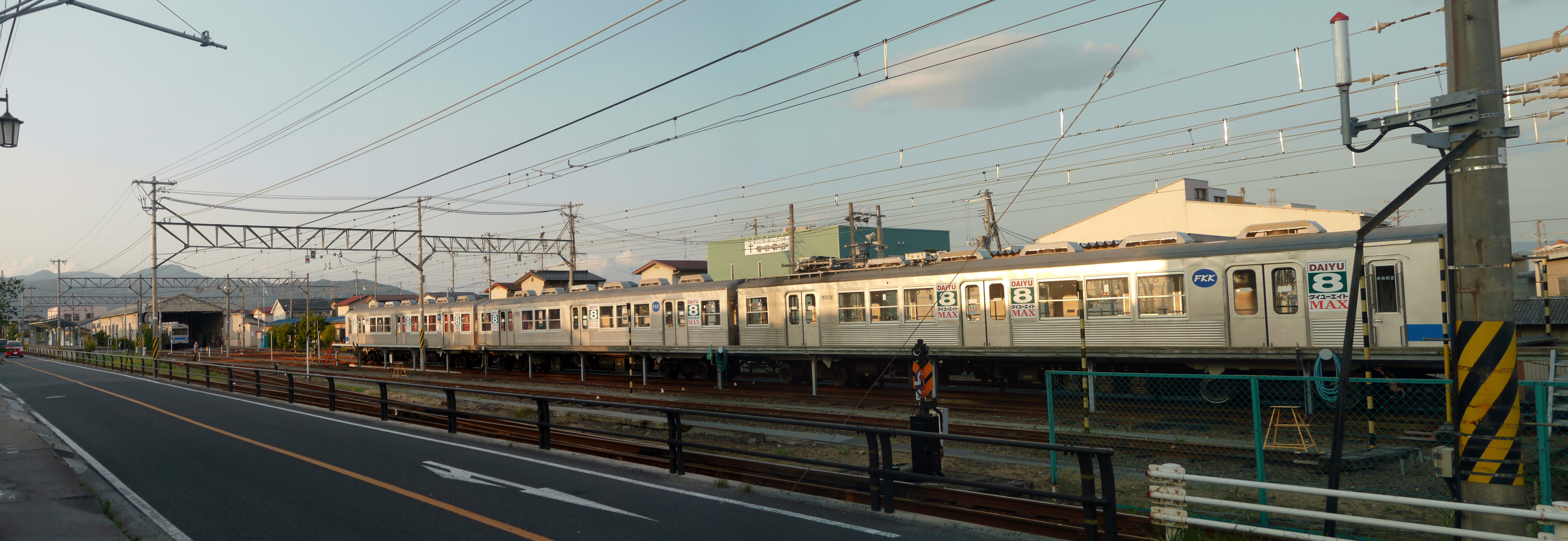
The Iizaka Line's rail yard and Sakuramizu Station's platform

Sakuramizu Station has a single island platform with an underground walkway that connects the station to the platform—the only such walkway on the Iizaka Line. The ticket window is located on the first floor of the station. Commuter passes, ticket books, and connection tickets to the Abukuma Express Line are sold at the window. There is also a ticket vending machine. The Iizaka Line offices are located on the second floor. In addition, Sakuramizu serves as the Iizaka Line's rail yard, and as such has facilities for storage and maintenance for the line's fleet of Fukushima Transportation 7000 series trains.

== History ==
Sakuramizu Station was opened on 20 August 1975.
