= Iohji-mae Station =

Railway station in Fukushima, Fukushima Prefecture, Japan

Iohji-mae Station 医王寺前駅
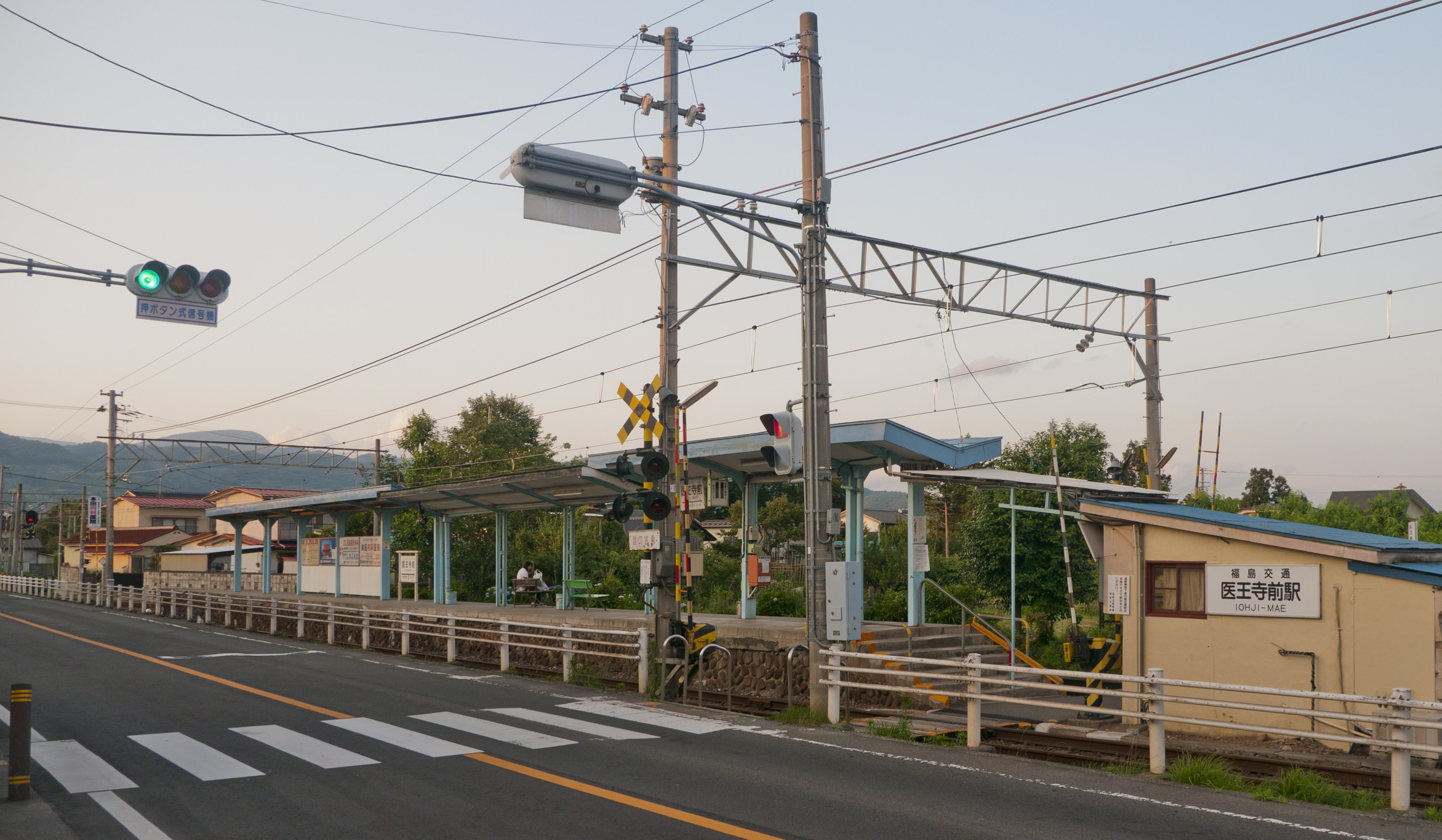
- Iohji-mae Station in July 2011

General information
- Location: 14, Iizakamachi Hirano Aza Michizoe; Fukushima; Japan
- Coordinates: 37°48′59″N 140°26′46″E
- Operator: Fukushima Transportation
- Distance: 7.4 km (4.6 mi) from Fukushima
- Platforms: 1 side platform
- Tracks: 1

Construction
- Structure type: At-grade

Other information
- Status: Staffed
- Website: Official website

History
- Opened: June 20, 1925
- Former names: Butsusakagami (until 1926)

Services
Preceding station	Fukushima Transportation	Following station
Hirano towards Fukushima	Iizaka Line	Hanamizuzaka towards Iizaka Onsen
Location
- Location within Fukushima Prefecture Location within Japan

Iohji-mae Station (Japanese: 医王寺前駅, Hepburn: Iōji-mae eki) is a railway station in the city of Fukushima, Fukushima Prefecture, Japan operated by Fukushima Kōtsū.

== Lines ==
Iohji-mae Station is served by the Iizaka Line and is located 7.4 kilometres (4.6 mi) from the starting point of the line at Fukushima

== Station layout ==
Iohji-mae Station has one side platform serving a single bi-directional track. It is staffed in the morning and evening. There is also a bicycle parking area situated behind the station.

== History ==
Ioh-ji Station was opened on June 20, 1925 as Butsusakagami Station (仏坂上駅). It was renamed to its present name on November 20, 1926.
