= Iwashiroshimizu Station =

Railway station in Fukushima, Fukushima Prefecture, Japan

Iwashiroshimizu Station 岩代清水駅
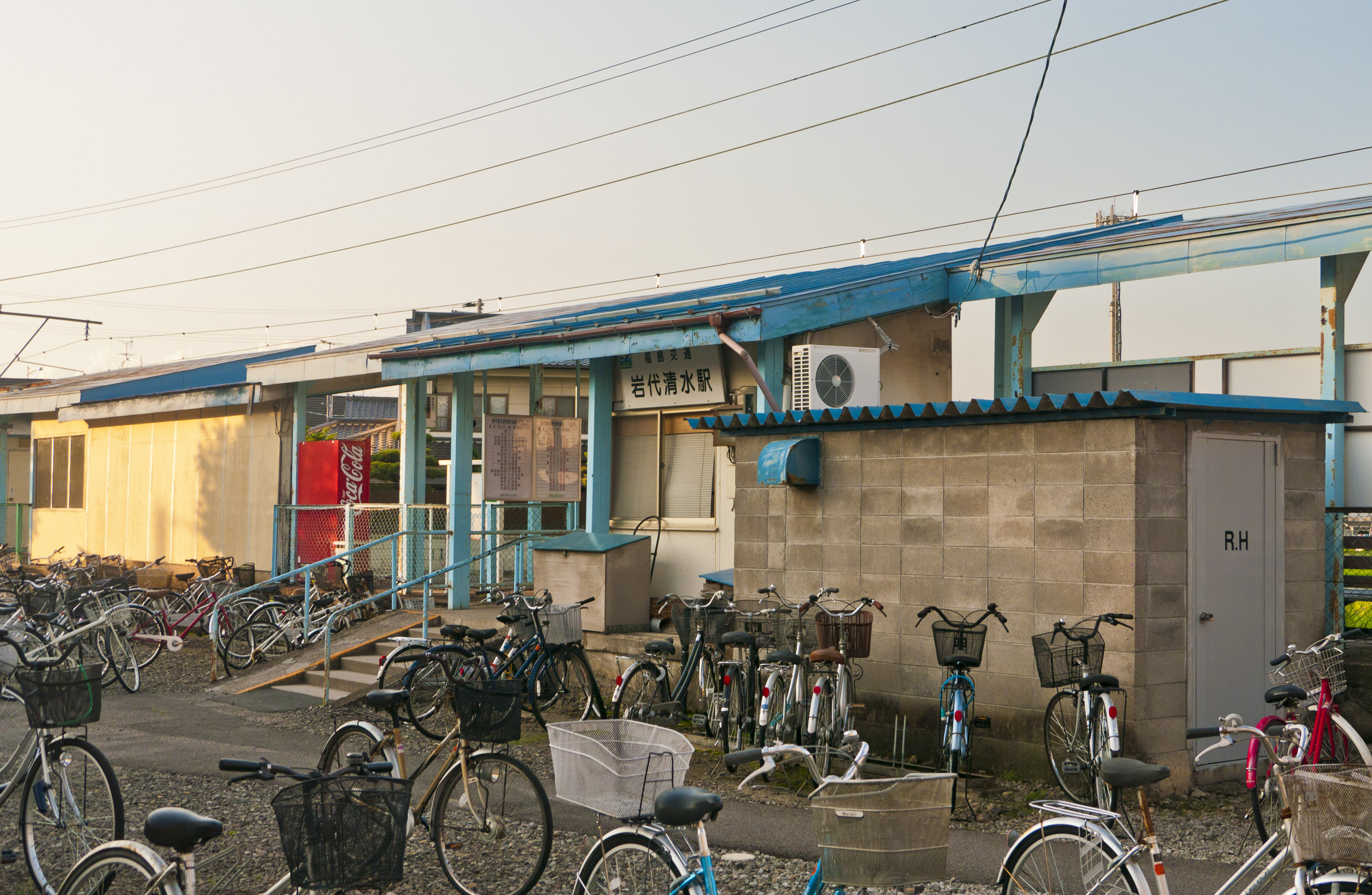
- Iwashiroshimizu Station in July 2011

General information
- Location: 36-1, Izumi Aza Daibutsu; Fukushima; Japan
- Coordinates: 37°46′34″N 140°26′53″E
- Operator: Fukushima Transportation
- Distance: 2.7 km (1.7 mi) from Fukushima
- Platforms: 1 side platform
- Tracks: 1
- Connections: Bus stop

Construction
- Structure type: At-grade

Other information
- Status: Staffed
- Website: Official website

History
- Opened: 21 June 1925
- Former names: Shimizuyakubamae (until 1944)

Services
Preceding station	Fukushima Transportation	Following station
Bijutsukantoshokanmae towards Fukushima	Iizaka Line	Izumi towards Iizaka Onsen
Location
- Location within Fukushima Prefecture Location within Japan

Iwashiroshimizu Station (Japanese: 岩代清水駅, Hepburn: Iwashiro-Shimizu Eki) is a railway station located in the city of Fukushima, Fukushima Prefecture, Japan operated by Fukushima Transportation. Iwashiroshimizu is unique in that it is the last remaining station to be named after the former Iwashiro Province. In 1965 Iwashiro-Atami Station, at the time on the JNR's Ban'etsu West Line, was renamed to Bandai-Atami Station. With the 1972 closure of the Kawamate Line, Iwashiro-Iino Station and Iwashiro-Kawamata Station were shut down. This leaves Iwashiroshimizu as the final station bearing the name of the former province.

== Lines ==
Iwashiroshimizu Station is served by the Iizaka Line and is located 2.7 kilometres (1.7 mi) from the starting point of the line at Fukushima.

== Station layout ==
Iwashiroshimizu Station has one above-ground side platform serving a single bi-directional track. It is staffed in the morning and evening on non-holiday weekdays. There is a proof-of-departure ticket machine and a beverage vending machine located at the station.

== History ==
Iwashiroshimizu Station was opened on June 21, 1925, as Shimizuyakubamae Station (清水役場前駅). It was renamed to its present name on December 29, 1944.

== Surrounding area ==
- Iwashiroshimizu Station is only approximately 300 metres (984 ft) from the neighboring Izumi Station.
