= Kamimatsukawa Station =

Railway station in Fukushima, Fukushima Prefecture, Japan

Kamimatsukawa Station 上松川駅
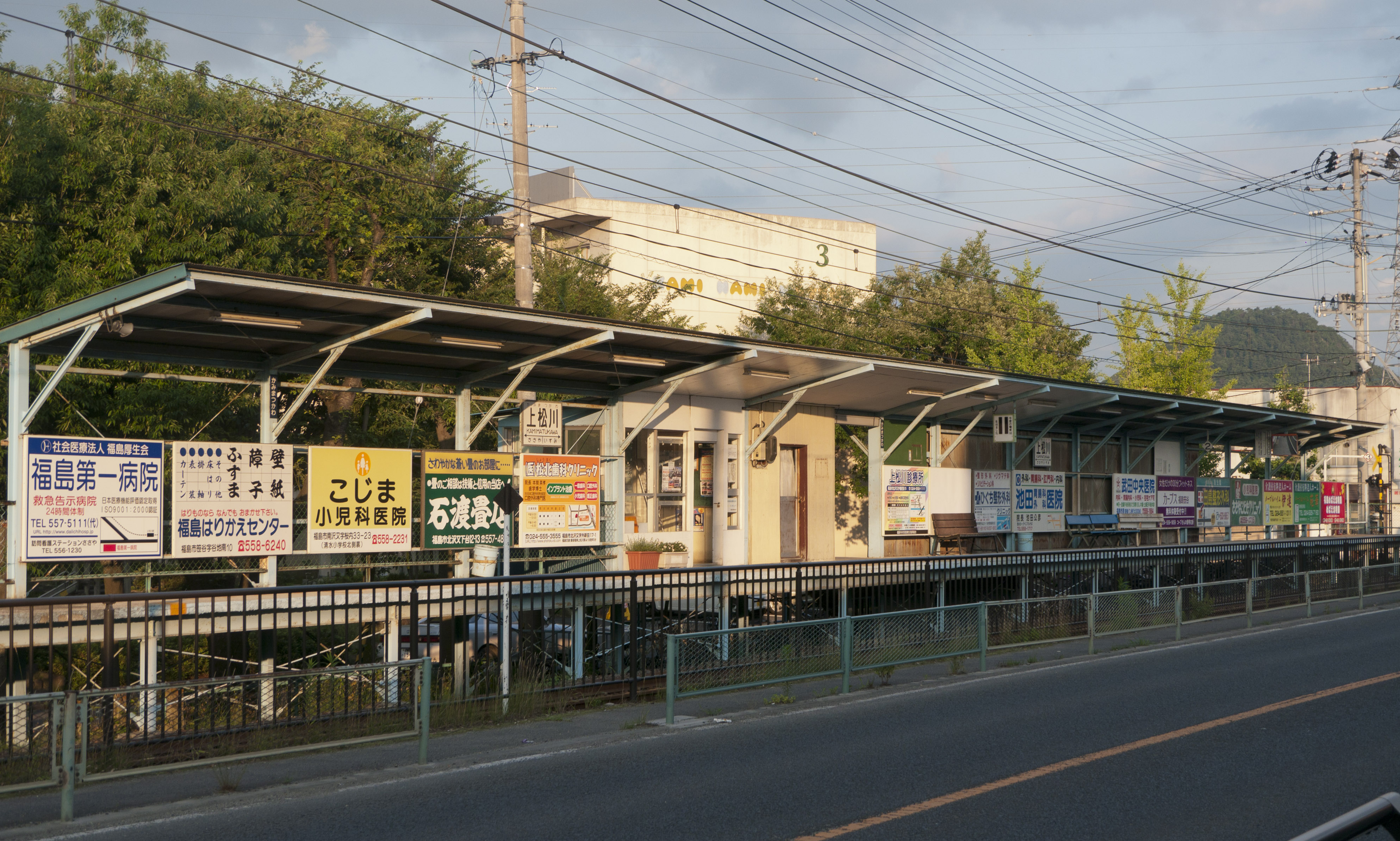
- Kamimatsukawa Station

General information
- Location: 19-1, Minawasamata Aza Kaminamimatsu; Fukushima; Japan
- Coordinates: 37°47′01″N 140°26′28″E
- Operator: Fukushima Transportation
- Distance: 3.7 km (2.3 mi) from Fukushima
- Platforms: 1 side platform
- Tracks: 1
- Connections: Bus stop

Construction
- Structure type: At-grade

Other information
- Status: Staffed
- Website: Official website

History
- Opened: 10 January 1964

Services
| Preceding station | Fukushima Transportation | Following station |
|---|---|---|
| Izumi towards Fukushima | Iizaka Line | Sasaya towards Iizaka Onsen |
Location
- Location within Fukushima Prefecture Location within Japan

Kamimatsukawa Station (Japanese: 上松川駅, Hepburn: Kamimatsukawa Eki) is a railway station in the city of Fukushima in Fukushima Prefecture, Japan. It is operated by Fukushima Transportation.

== Lines ==
Kamimatsukawa Station is served by the Iizaka Line and is located 3.7 kilometres (2.3 mi) from the starting point of the line at Fukushima.

== Station layout ==
Kamimatsukawa Station has one side platform serving a single bi-directional track. It has a ticket window which is staffed in the morning and evening on weekdays and all day on holidays. At the station there is also a proof-of-departure ticket machine, a beverage vending machine, and a waiting room.

== History ==
Kamimatsukawa Station was opened on 10 January 1964.

== Surrounding area ==
- Fukushima Dai-Ichi Hospital
