= Sasaya Station =

Railway station in Fukushima, Fukushima Prefecture, Japan

Sasaya Station 笹谷駅
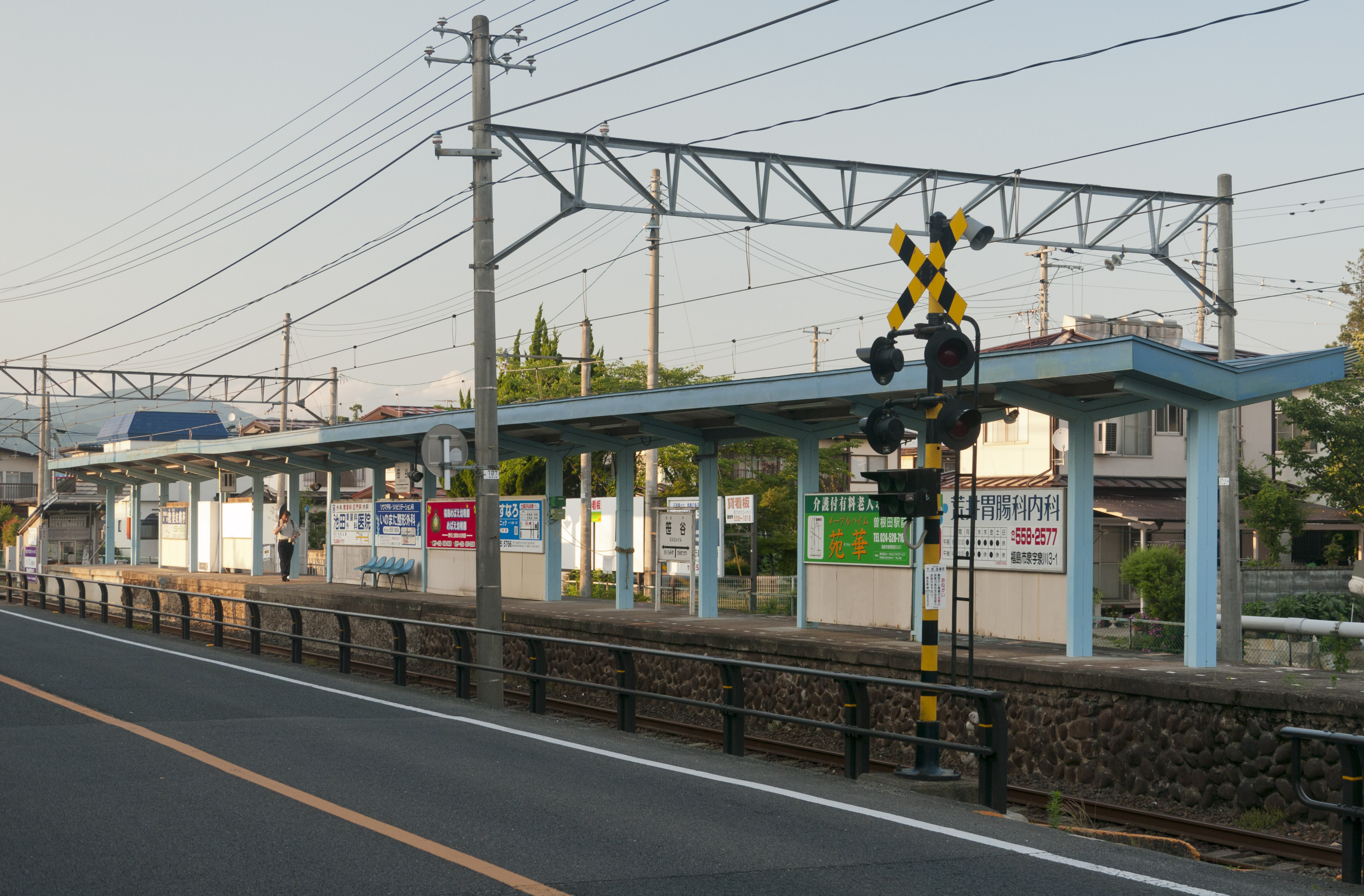
- Sasaya Station

General information
- Location: 18-2, Sasaya Aza Sambommatsu; Fukushima; Japan
- Coordinates: 37°47′15″N 140°26′23″E
- Operator: Fukushima Transportation
- Distance: 4.2 km (2.6 mi) from Fukushima
- Platforms: 1 island platform
- Tracks: 2

Construction
- Structure type: At-grade

Other information
- Status: Staffed
- Website: Official website

History
- Opened: 13 April 1924
- Former names: Maeyachi (until 1925)

Services
Preceding station	Fukushima Transportation	Following station
Kamimatsukawa towards Fukushima	Iizaka Line	Sakuramizu towards Iizaka Onsen
Location
- Location within Fukushima Prefecture Location within Japan

Sasaya Station (Japanese: 笹谷駅, Hepburn: Sasaya eki) is a railway station in the city of Fukushima, Fukushima Prefecture, Japan operated by Fukushima Kōtsū.

== Lines ==
Sasaya Station is served by the Iizaka Line and is located 4.2 kilometres (2.6 mi) from the starting point of the line at Fukushima.

== Station layout ==
Sasaya Station has one island platform with a level crossing, serving two tracks. There is a ticket window, a proof-of-departure ticket machine, a restroom, and a beverage vending machine located at the station.

== History ==
Sasaya Station was opened on 13 April 1924, along with the opening of the Fukushima Iizaka Tramway (福島飯坂電車軌道, Fukushima Iizaka Dennsha Kidō) as Maeyachi Station (前谷地駅). It was renamed to its present name on 10 February 1925.

== Surrounding area ==
- Fukushima Dai-Ichi Hospital
