= Bijutsukantoshokanmae Station =

Railway station in Fukushima, Fukushima Prefecture, Japan

Bijutsukantoshokanmae Station 美術館図書館前駅
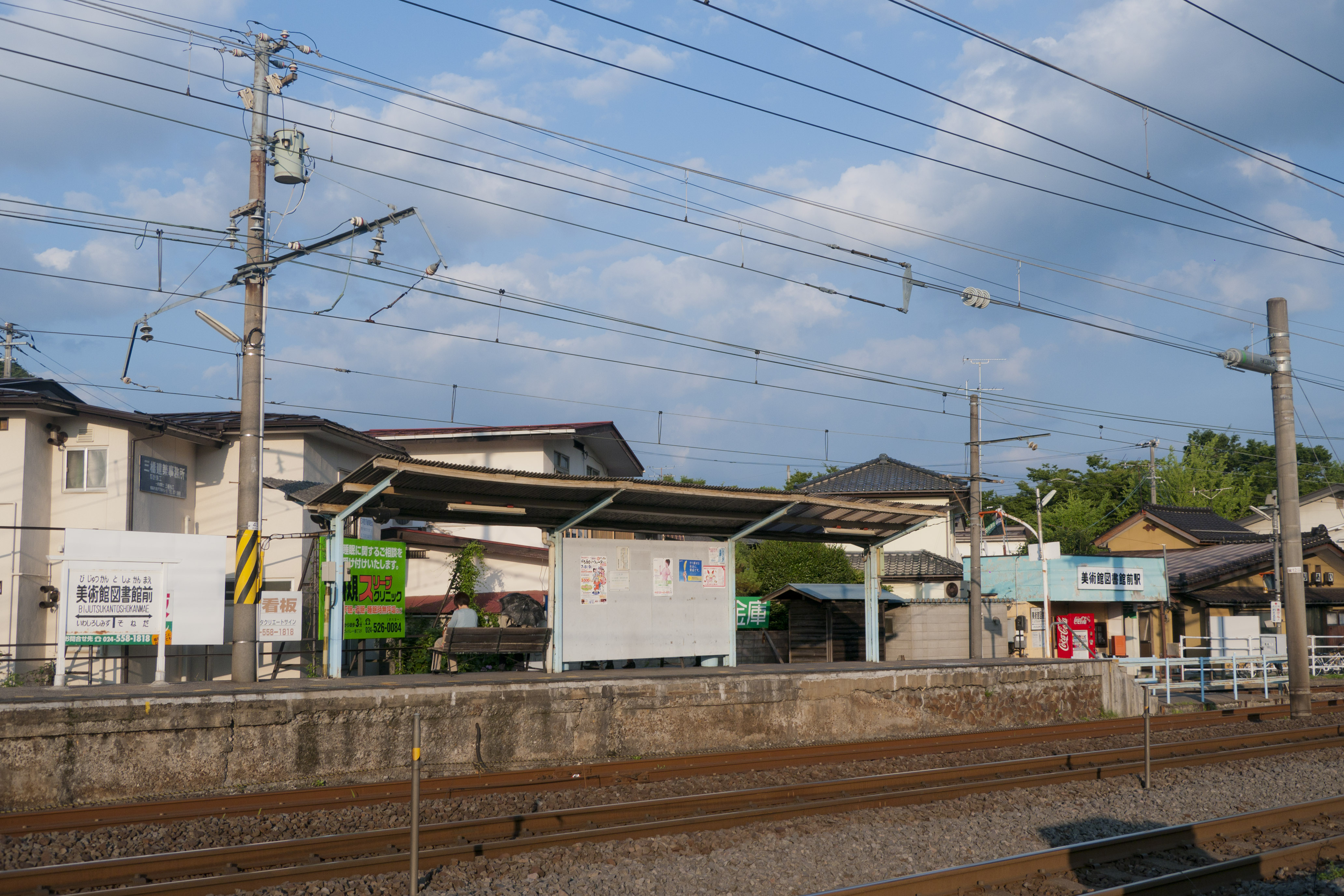
- Bijutsukantoshokanmae Station platform

General information
- Location: 3-5, Moriai-cho Aza Utena; Fukushima; Japan
- Coordinates: 37°46′01″N 140°27′20″E
- Operator: Fukushima Transportation
- Line: Iizaka Line
- Distance: 1.4 km (0.87 mi) from Fukushima
- Platforms: 1 island platform
- Tracks: 2
- Connections: Bus stop

Construction
- Structure type: At-grade

Other information
- Status: Staffed
- Website: Official website

History
- Opened: 13 April 1924
- Former names: Moriai (until 1991)

Services
Preceding station	Fukushima Transportation	Following station
Iwashiroshimizu towards Fukushima	Iizaka Line	Soneda towards Iizaka Onsen
Location
- Location within Fukushima Prefecture Location within Japan

Bijutsukantoshokanmae Station (Japanese: 美術館図書館前, Hepburn: Bijutsukan-Toshokan-mae eki) is a railway station in the city of Fukushima, Fukushima Prefecture, Japan operated by Fukushima Kōtsū. The station's name translates to "In Front of the Art Museum and Library", as it is the station that serves the Fukushima Prefectural Museum of Art and the Fukushima Prefectural Library.

== Lines ==
Bijutsukantoshokanmae Station is served by the Iizaka Line and is located 1.4 kilometres (0.87 mi) from the starting point of the line at Fukushima.

== Station layout ==
Bijutsukantoshokanmae Station has a single island platform connected to the station building by a level crossing at the end of the platform. It is staffed in the morning and evening. There is a proof-of-departure ticket machine, a restroom, a beverage vending machine, and a bench located at the station.

== History ==
Bijutsukantoshokanmae Station was opened on April 13, 1924 along with the opening of the Fukushima Iizaka Tramway (福島飯坂電車軌道, Fukushima Iizaka Dennsha Kidō) as Moriai Station (森合駅). In 1942, due to the section of track between Fukushima and Moriai being changed to dedicated tramway track, Soneda and Moriai stations were shut down. Moriai Station was reopened in a new location. It was renamed to its present name in 1991.

== Surrounding area ==
- Fukushima Prefectural Museum of Art
- Fukushima Prefectural Library

== See also ==
- List of railway stations in Japan
