= Iizaka =

Iizaka may refer to:

- Iizaka, Fukushima, a former town in Fukushima, Japan
  - Iizaka Onsen Station, a train station in Iizaka, Fukushima
  - Fukushima Kōtsū Iizaka Line, the train line that links Iizaka Onsen Station to Fukushima Station
