= Izumi Station (Fukushima) =

Railway station in Fukushima, Fukushima Prefecture, Japan

Izumi Station 泉駅
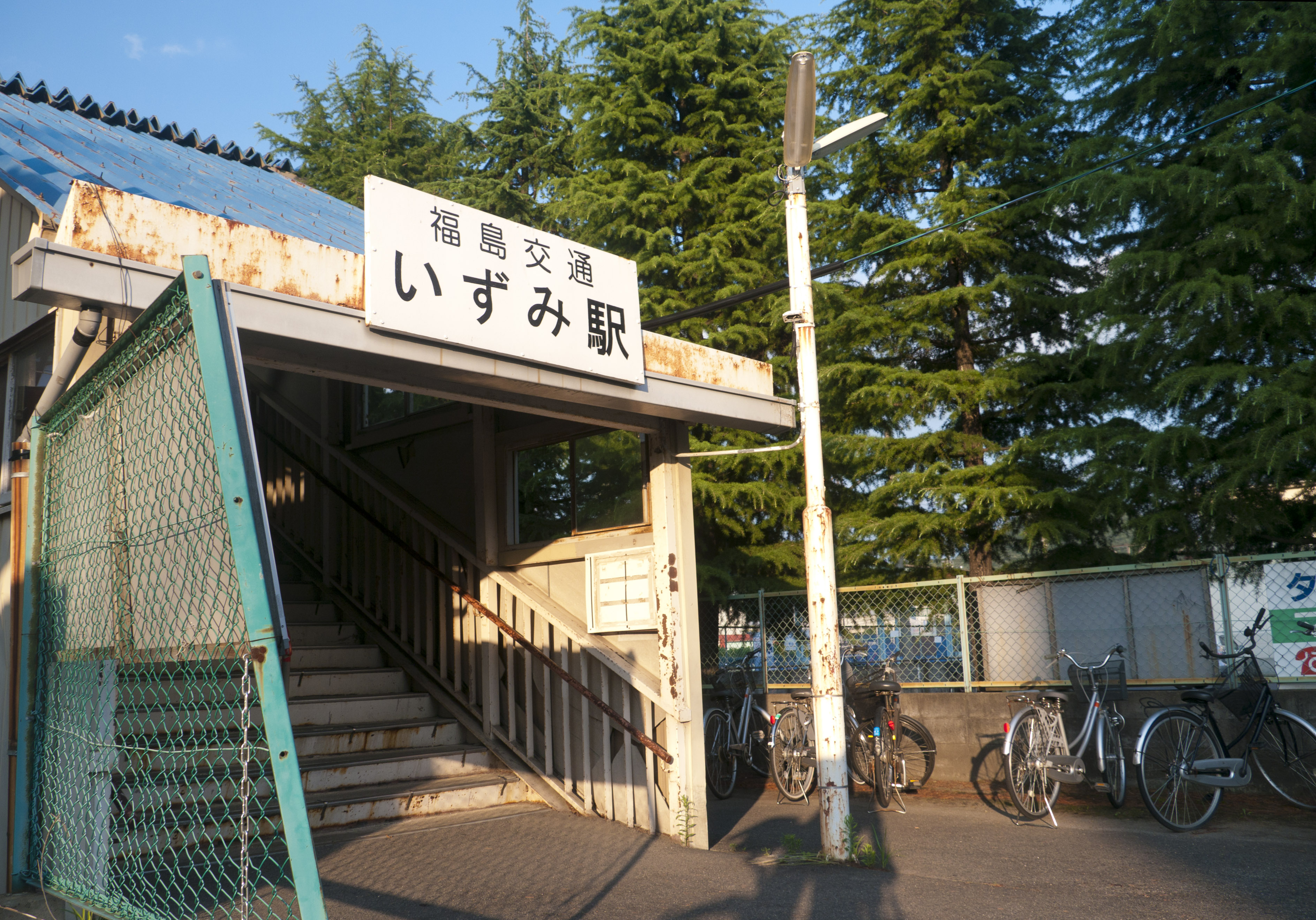
- Izumi Station's west exit

General information
- Location: 5-4, Izumi Aza Waseda; Fukushima; Japan
- Coordinates: 37°46′43″N 140°26′44″E
- Operator: Fukushima Transportation
- Distance: 3.0 km (1.9 mi) from Fukushima
- Platforms: 1 island platform
- Tracks: 2
- Connections: Bus stop

Construction
- Structure type: At-grade

Other information
- Status: Unstaffed
- Website: Official website

History
- Opened: 4 March 1940

Services
Preceding station	Fukushima Transportation	Following station
Iwashiroshimizu towards Fukushima	Iizaka Line	Kamimatsukawa towards Iizaka Onsen
Location
- Location within Fukushima Prefecture Location within Japan

Izumi Station (Japanese: 泉駅, Hepburn: Izumi eki) is a railway station in the city of Fukushima, Fukushima Prefecture, Japan operated by Fukushima Kōtsū.

== Rails ==
Izumi Station is served by the Iizaka Line and is located 3.0 kilometres (1.9 mi) from the starting point of the line at Fukushima.

== Station layout ==
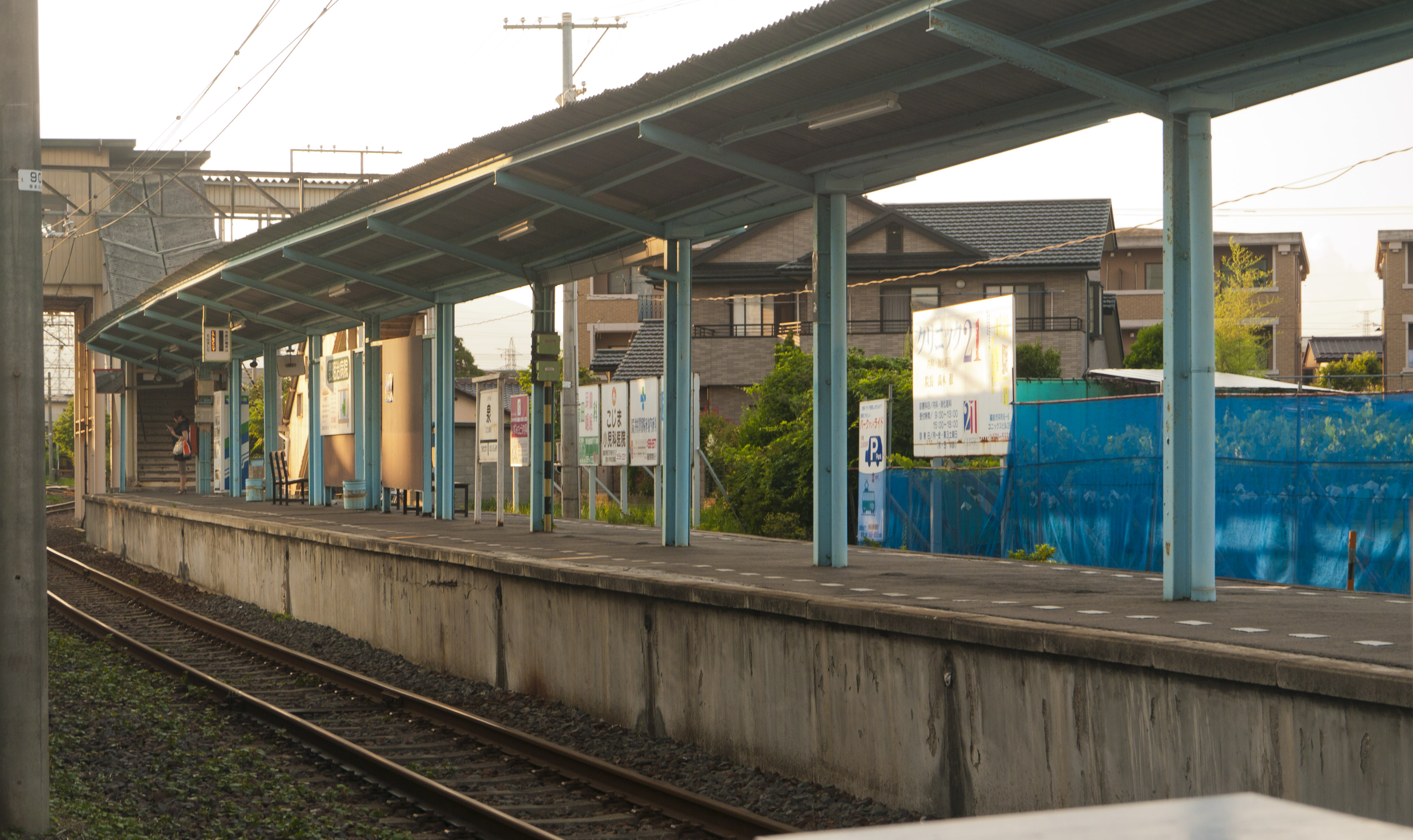
Izumi Station's platform

Izumi Station has a one island platform with an elevated station building serving as a footbridge. Formerly a staffed station, it is now unstaffed. It is also the only station on the Fukushima Kōtsū Iizaka Line Izaka Line that utilizes a bridge overpass over the tracks. Inside, there is a proof-of-departure ticket machine, a bench, and a beverage vending machine.

== History ==
Izumi Station was opened on 4 March 1940.
