= Hanamizuzaka Station =

Railway station in Fukushima, Fukushima Prefecture, Japan

Hanamizuzaka Station 花水坂駅
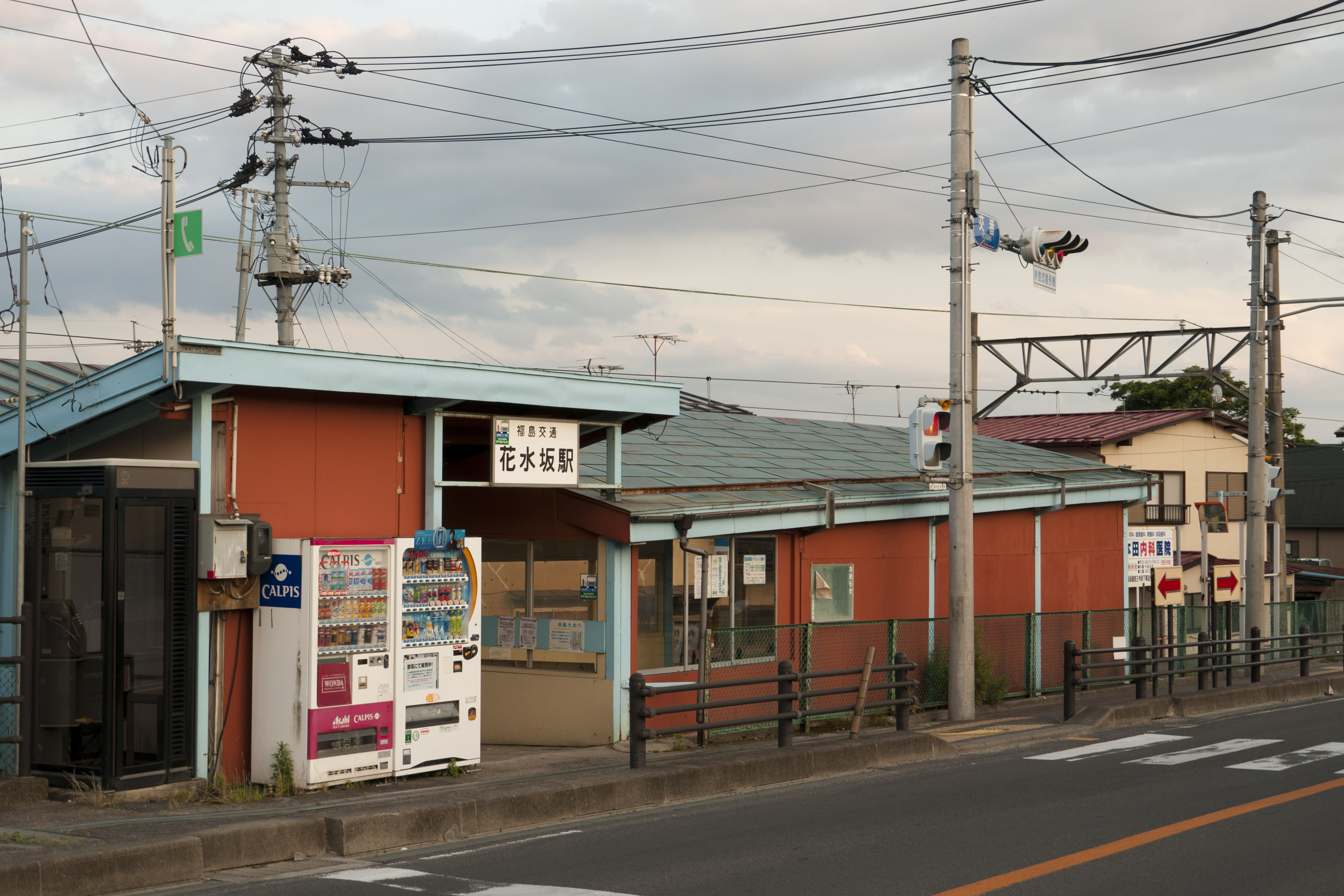
- Hanamizuzaka Station in July 2011

General information
- Location: 5-1, Iizaka-machi Aza Machiura; Fukushima; Japan
- Coordinates: 37°49′39″N 140°27′03″E
- Operator: Fukushima Transportation
- Distance: 8.7 km (5.4 mi) from Fukushima
- Platforms: 1 side platform
- Tracks: 1
- Connections: Bus stop

Construction
- Structure type: At-grade

Other information
- Status: Unstaffed
- Website: Official website

History
- Opened: 13 April 1924
- Former names: Iizaka (until 1927)

Services
Preceding station	Fukushima Transportation	Following station
Iohji-mae towards Fukushima	Iizaka Line	Iizaka Onsen Terminus
Location
- Location within Fukushima Prefecture Location within Japan

Hanamizuzaka Station (Japanese: 花水坂駅, Hepburn: Hanamizuzaka eki) is a railway station in the city of Fukushima, Fukushima Prefecture, Japan operated by Fukushima Kōtsū.

== Lines ==
Hanamizuzaka Station is served by the Iizaka Line and is located 8.7 kilometres (5.4 mi) from the starting point of the line at Fukushima

== Station layout ==
Hanamizuzaka Station has one side platform serving a single bi-directional track. The station is unattended. There is a single machine that dispenses proof-of-departure tickets, a beverage vending machine, a waiting room, and a public telephone. There is also a bicycle parking area situated next to the station.

== History ==
The station commenced operations on 13 April 1924. At the time it was named Iizaka Station (飯坂駅, Iizaka eki) and was the final station on the Fukushima-Iizaka Electric Tramway (福島飯坂電気軌道, Fukushima-Iizaka Denki Kidō), the predecessor to the Iizaka Line. On 23 March 1927, the station was renamed to its present-day name of Hanamizuzaka. In 2007 the waiting room and security cameras were added.
