= Hirano Station (Fukushima) =

Railway station in Fukushima, Fukushima Prefecture, Japan

Hirano Station 平野駅
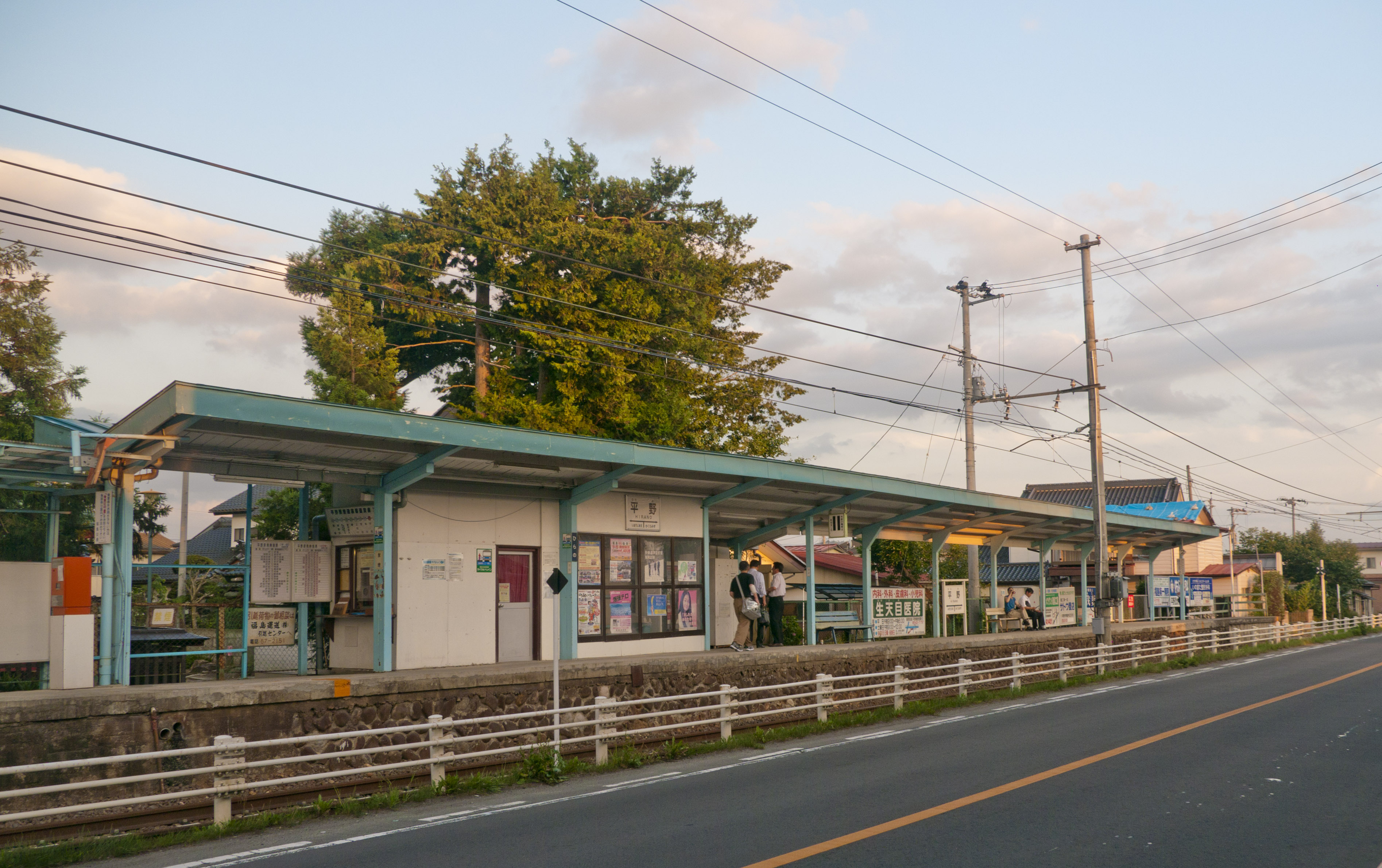
- Hirano Station in July 2011

General information
- Location: 16, Iizaka-machi Hirano Aza Dōnomae; Fukushima; Japan
- Coordinates: 37°48′20″N 140°26′34″E
- Operator: Fukushima Transportation
- Distance: 6.2 km (3.9 mi) from Fukushima
- Platforms: 1 side platform
- Tracks: 1

Construction
- Structure type: At-grade

Other information
- Status: Staffed
- Website: Official website

History
- Opened: 20 June 1925
- Former names: Myōjinmachi (until 1927)

Services
Preceding station	Fukushima Transportation	Following station
Sakuramizu towards Fukushima	Iizaka Line	Iohji-mae towards Iizaka Onsen
Location
- Location within Fukushima Prefecture Location within Japan

Hirano Station (Japanese: 平野駅, Hepburn: Hirano eki) is a railway station in the city of Fukushima, Fukushima Prefecture, Japan operated by Fukushima Kōtsū.

== Lines ==
Hirano Station is served by the Iizaka Line and is located 6.2 kilometres (3.9 mi) from the starting point of the line at Fukushima

== Station layout ==
Hirano Station has one side platform serving a single bi-directional track. It is usually staffed in the morning and evening. For times when the station is unattended, there is a machine that dispenses proof-of-departure tickets.

== History ==
Hirano Station was opened on 20 June 1925 as Myōjinmachi Station (明神町駅). It was renamed to its present name on 15 August 1927.
