= Hirano Station =

Hirano Station is the name of four train stations in Japan:

- Hirano Station (Fukushima)
- Hirano Station (Hyōgo)
- Hirano Station (JR West)
- Hirano Station (Osaka Metro)
- Hirano Station (Nankai)
