= Niwasaka Station =

Railway station in Fukushima, Fukushima Prefecture, Japan

Niwasaka Station 庭坂駅
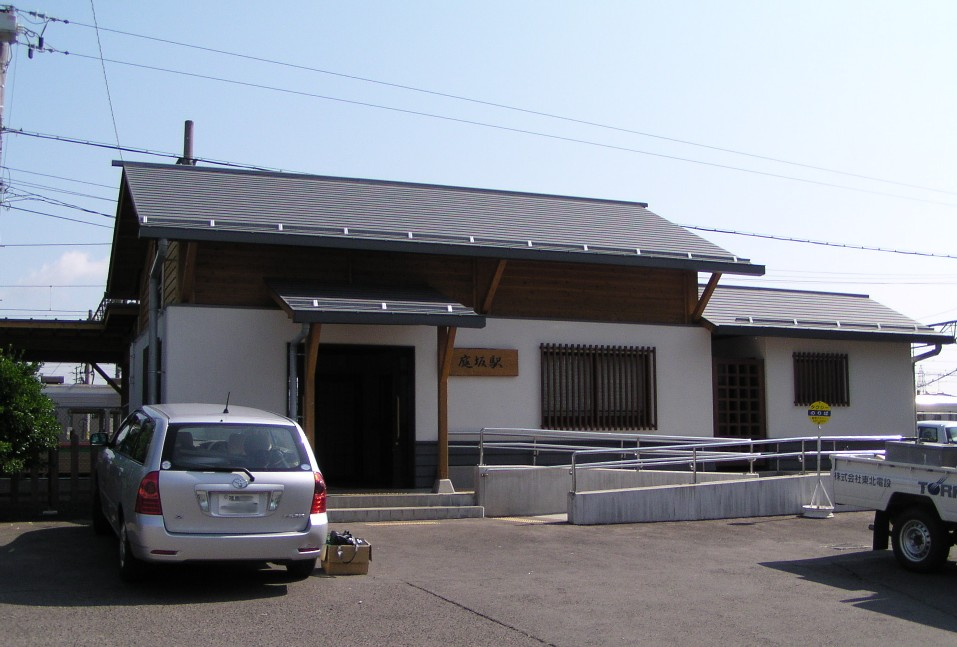
- Niwasaka Station in August 2006

General information
- Location: 1 Kitsunebayashi Machiniwasaka; Fukushima; Japan
- Coordinates: 37°46′17″N 140°23′24″E
- Operator: JR East
- Line: Ōu Main Line
- Distance: 6.9 km (4.3 mi) from Fukushima
- Platforms: 1 side platform, 1 island platform
- Tracks: 3
- Connections: Bus stop

Construction
- Structure type: At-grade

Other information
- Status: Unstaffed
- Website: Official website

History
- Opened: 15 May 1899

Services
| Preceding station | JR East | Following station |
|---|---|---|
| Sasakino towards Fukushima | Yamagata Line | Itaya towards Shinjō |
Location
- Location within Fukushima Prefecture Location within Japan

Niwasaka Station (Japanese: 庭坂駅, Hepburn: Niwasaka-eki) is a railway station on the Ōu Main Line in the city of Fukushima, Fukushima Prefecture, Japan, operated by the East Japan Railway Company (JR East). The station is served by Yamagata Line local trains and is located 6.9 kilometres (4.3 mi) from the line’s terminus at Fukushima Station. Although Yamagata Shinkansen services operate on the same tracks, they pass through the station without stopping.

== Station layout ==
Niwasaka Station consists of one island platform and one side platform, connected to the station building by a footbridge. The station is unattended.

=== Platforms ===
| 1 | ■ Yamagata Line (Ou Main Line) | for Yonezawa |
| 2 | ■ Yamagata Line (Ou Main Line) | for Fukushima and Yonezawa |
| 3 | ■ Yamagata Line (Ou Main Line) | for Fukushima |

== History ==
The station opened on 15 May 1899. It became part of the JR East network following the privatization of Japanese National Railways on 1 April 1987.

The tracks of the Yamagata Line were re-gauged from narrow gauge to standard gauge between 1988 and 1992 as part of the Yamagata Shinkansen project. Since then, the Yamagata Line has operated exclusively with standard-gauge rolling stock and is physically disconnected from other sections of the Ōu Main Line beyond Shinjō.

The current station building was completed in March 2003.
