= Izumi-Chūō Station =

Izumi-Chūō Station is the name of three train stations in Japan.

- Izumi-Chūō Station (Miyagi) (泉中央駅) in Sendai, Miyagi Prefecture
- Izumi-chūō Station (Kanagawa) (いずみ中央駅) in Yokohama, Kanagawa Prefecture
- Izumi-Chūō Station (Osaka) (和泉中央駅) in Izumi, Osaka Prefecture

== See also ==
- Izumi Station (disambiguation)
