= Sasakino Station =

Railway station in Fukushima, Fukushima Prefecture, Japan

Sasakino Station 笹木野駅
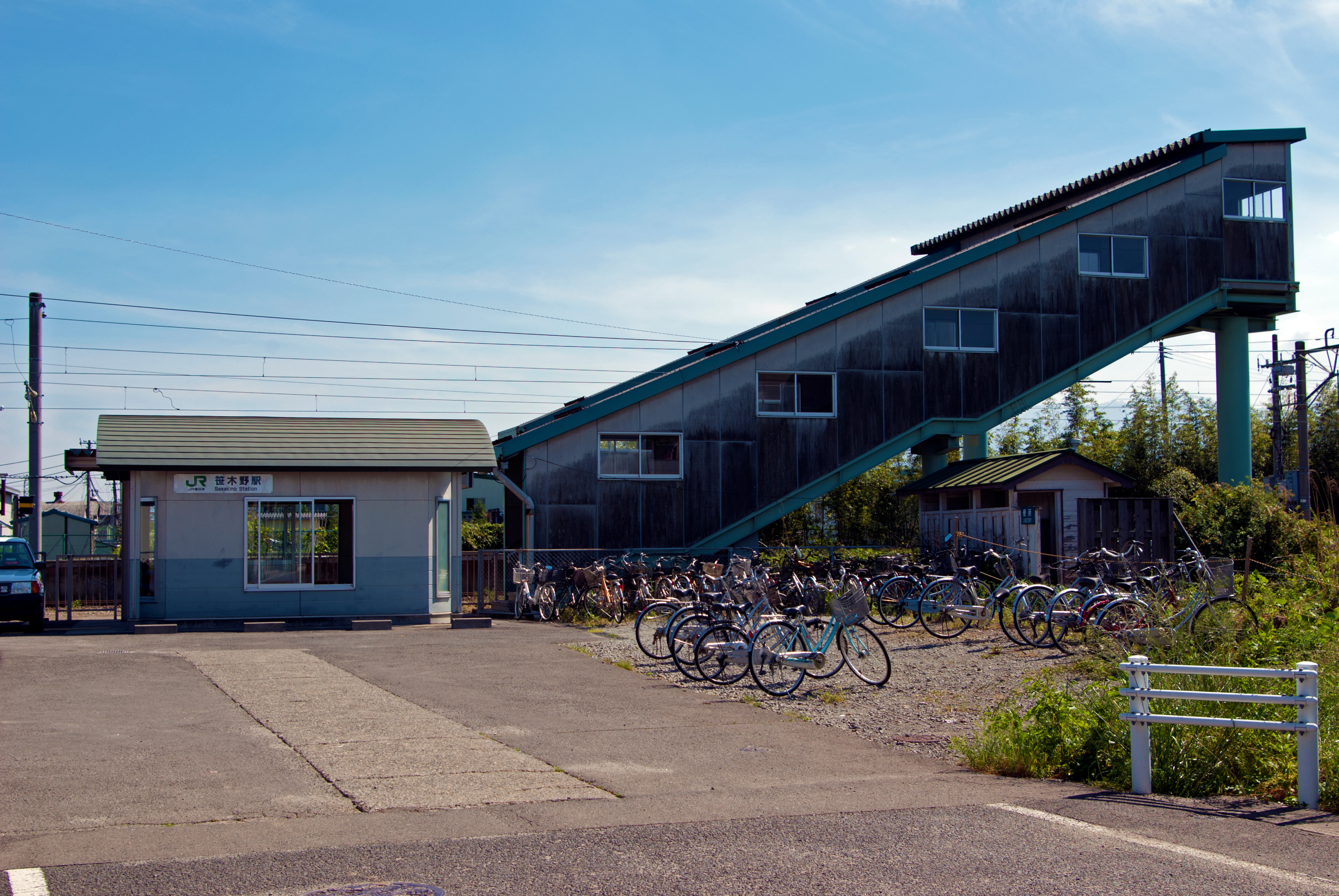
- Sasaekino Station in June 2010

General information
- Location: Kanayahigashi, Sasakino; Fukushima; Japan
- Coordinates: 37°45′58″N 140°25′31″E
- Operator: JR East
- Line: Ōu Main Line
- Distance: 3.8 km (2.4 mi) from Fukushima
- Platforms: 1 island platform
- Tracks: 2
- Connections: Bus stop

Other information
- Status: Unstaffed
- Website: Official website

History
- Opened: 15 August 1919

Passengers
- FY2000: 310 daily

Services
Preceding station	JR East	Following station
Fukushima Terminus	Yamagata Line	Niwasaka towards Shinjō
Location
- Location within Fukushima Prefecture Location within Japan

Sasakino Station (Japanese: 笹木野駅, Hepburn: Sasakino-eki) is a railway station on the Ōu Main Line in the city of Fukushima, Fukushima Prefecture, Japan, operated by the East Japan Railway Company (JR East). The station is served by Yamagata Line local trains and is located 3.8 kilometres (2.4 mi) from the line’s terminus at Fukushima Station. Although Yamagata Shinkansen services operate on the same tracks, they pass through the station without stopping.

== Station layout ==
Niwasaka Station consists of one island platform connected to the station building by a footbridge. The station is unattended.

=== Platforms ===
1	■ Yamagata Line (Ou Main Line)	for Fukushima
2	■ Yamagata Line (Ou Main Line)	for Niwasaka and Yonezawa

== History ==
The station opened on 15 August 1919. It became part of the JR East network following the privatization of Japanese National Railways on 1 April 1987.

The tracks of the Yamagata Line were re-gauged from narrow gauge to standard gauge between 1988 and 1992 as part of the Yamagata Shinkansen project. Since then, the Yamagata Line has operated exclusively with standard-gauge rolling stock and is physically disconnected from other sections of the Ōu Main Line beyond Shinjō.
