= Izumi Station =

Izumi Station is the name of multiple train stations in Japan.

- Izumi Station (Kagoshima) (出水駅)
- Izumi Station (Iwaki) (泉駅) - in Iwaki, Fukushima Prefecture
- Izumi Station (Fukushima) (泉駅) - in Fukushima, Fukushima Prefecture
