= Iizaka Onsen =

Hot spring resort in Fukushima Prefecture, Japan

Iizaka Onsen 飯坂温泉
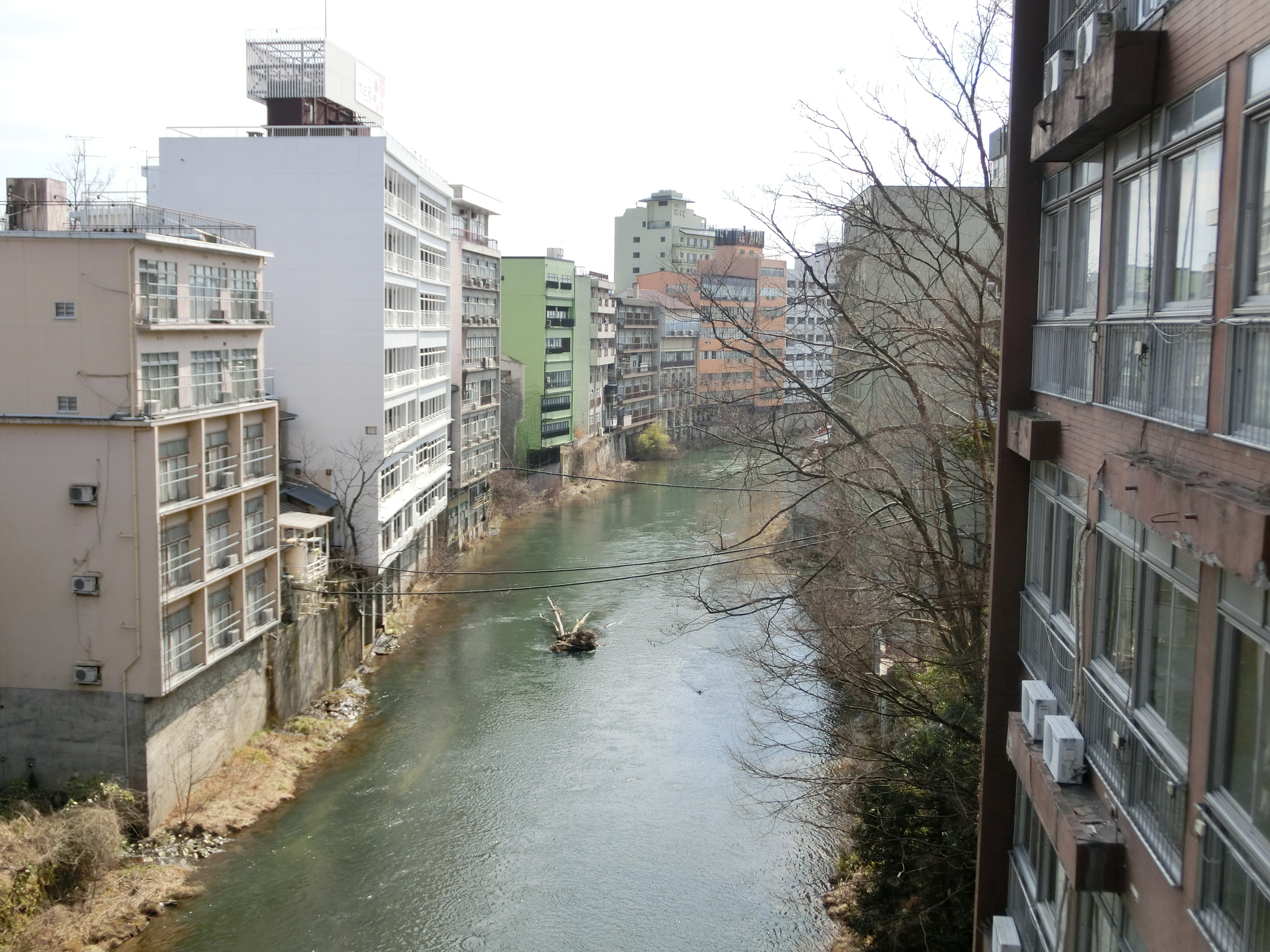
- Iizaka Onsen

- Location within Fukushima Prefecture Location within Japan
- Interactive map of Iizaka Onsen 飯坂温泉
- Location: Fukushima, Fukushima, Japan
- Coordinates: 37°49′57″N 140°27′08″E
- Temperature: 42 deg C

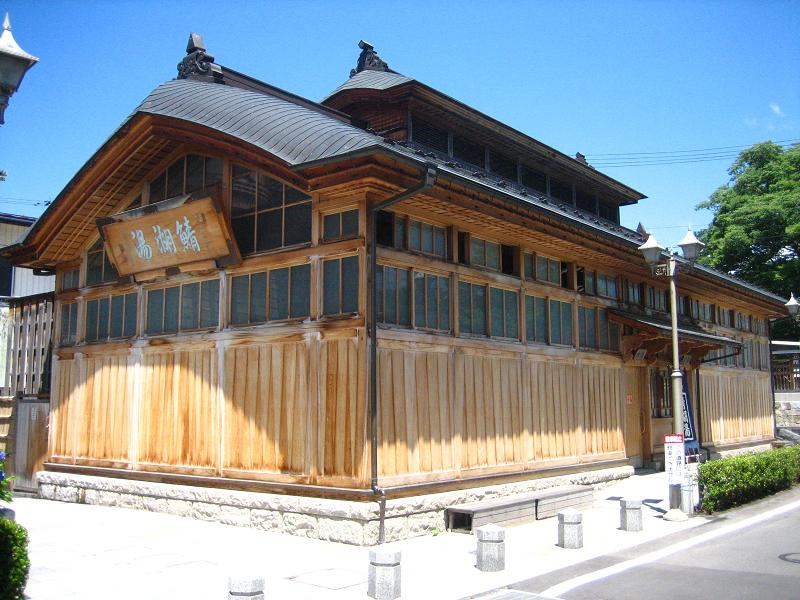
Sabakoyu

Iizaka Onsen (飯坂温泉) is an onsen (hot spring resort) located in the Iizaka district (former town of Iizaka) within the city of Fukushima, Japan. It is located to the northwest of the city center, and is connected to Fukushima Station by the Fukushima Kōtsū Iizaka Line railway.

== Description ==
Iizaka traditional hot spring town features over 40 traditional ryokan, and 9 public baths, including one of Japan’s oldest community bathhouses, Sabakoyu (鯖湖湯 or "Mackerel Lake Baths"). Sabakoyu was originally spelled 佐波来湯 when, according to legend, Yamato Takeru, prince of the imperial house and son of semi-legendary 12th Emperor Keikō, visited the area and was cured of his sickness after bathing in the hot springs. Matsuo Bashō, the famous Edo period poet, visited Sabakoyu in 1689.
