= Fukushima Kōtsū Iizaka Line =

Railway line in Fukushima prefecture, Japan

Iizaka Line
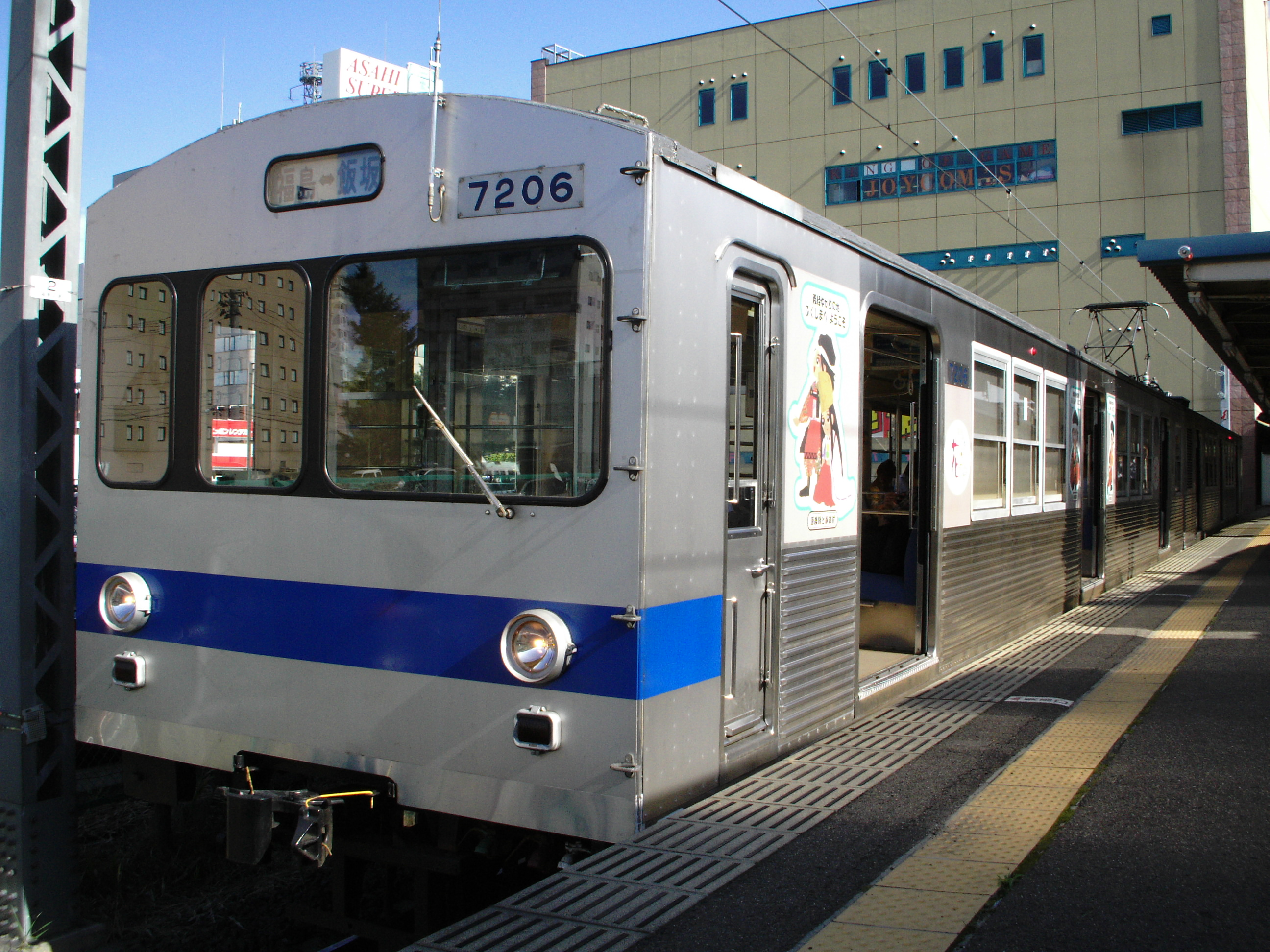
- A Fukushima Transportation 7000 series EMU

Overview
- Native name: 飯坂線
- Locale: Tōhoku
- Termini: Fukushima; Iizaka Onsen
- Stations: 12
- Website: Official website

Service
- Type: Commuter rail
- Operator: Fukushima Transportation
- Depot: Sakuramizu

History
- Opened: 13 April 1924

Technical
- Line length: 9.2 km (5.7 mi)
- Track gauge: 1,067 mm (3 ft 6 in)
- Electrification: Overhead line, 1,500 V DC

The Iizaka Line (Japanese: 飯坂線, Hepburn: Iizaka-sen), also known as the Iiden (いい電; lit. 'good train'), is a Japanese railway line which connects Fukushima Station in Fukushima City with Iizaka Onsen Station in Iizaka, both located in Fukushima Prefecture. It is owned and operated by Fukushima Transportation.

== History ==
=== 1920s ===
The Iizaka Line's history can be traced back to August 1921 and the founding of Iizaka Tramway (飯坂軌道, Iizaka Kidō) which changed its name to Fukushima Iizaka Electric Tramway (福島飯坂電気軌道, Fukushima Iizaka Denki Kidō) before the end of the year. The 8.9 km (5.5 mi) section of tramway track between Fukushima and Iizaka Station (present-day Hanamizuzaka) opened on 13 April 1923. Later on in the year the company was renamed Iizaka Electric Railway (飯坂電車, Iizaka Densha).

The track was soon extended, and in 1927 the present-day Iizaka Onsen Station became the new terminus with Iizaka Station's name being changed to Hanamizuzaka. 1927 also saw merger of Iizaka Electric Railway with Fukushima Electric Railway (福島電気鉄道, Fukushima Denki Testudō).

=== 1940s–1980s ===
Izumi Station opened in 1940, and in the following years the section between Fukushima and Moriai (present-day Bijutsukantoshokanmae) was converted to dedicated tramway track. Due to the rebuilding and moving of the track, Moriai was closed then reopened in a new location and Soneda was closed and rebuilt as Dentetsu Fukushima (present-day Soneda). In 1944, Shimizu Yakuba-mae was renamed Iwashiroshimizu. On 1 March 1945, the line was reclassified as a regional railway line.

Fukushima Electric Railway changed its name to Fukushima Transportation (福島交通, Fukushima Kōtsū) in 1962, and the same year Dentetsu Fukushima Station's name was changed to Soneda. Carrying capacity on the line was increased with the purchase of brand new 5000 series cars in 1963. Kamimatsukawa Station opened the following year.

Coming into the 1970s, capacity was increased further with the purchase of new 5300 series cars in 1971. The Iizaka East Line closed the same year, leaving the Iizaka Line as the only train line run by Fukushima Transportation. Sakuramizu Station opened in 1975, and three 3300 series cars were purchased from Tokyu in 1976.

In 1980 two more 5000 series cars were acquired from Tokyu, and two years later Iizaka Onsen Station was moved to coincide with the shortening of the line by 100 meters (330 ft).

=== 1990s–present ===
1991 saw multiple changes happen to the Iizaka Line, starting out with the renaming of Moriai to Bijutsukantoshokanmae. On 24 June 1991, the overhead catenary power supply was changed from 600 V to 1,500 V DC.

==== 2001 braking accident ====
At 21:35 JST (12:35 UTC) on 8 April 2001, a train that had departed from Iizaka Onsen in the direction of Fukushima had a brief power outage at Bijutsukantoshokanmae, two stations before Fukushima. When the train resumed operation it was realized that the braking system wasn't operating. The train continued past Soneda, the next station, and crashed through the buffer stop at Fukushima, the end of the line. The train continued for 12 meters (39 ft) further, coming to rest in Fukushima Station's East Building. Four people were injured, none seriously.

It was later discovered that due to improper maintenance, the power outage at Bijutsukantoshokanmae had caused the main brakes to become nonfunctional. The driver had also failed to activate the emergency brakes.

Following the accident, an ATS safety system was installed.

==== 2011 earthquake ====
All service on the Iizaka Line was shut down in the immediate aftermath of the 2011 Tōhoku earthquake and tsunami on 11 March, with normal service being restored two days later on 13 March.

== Stations ==
Station	Distance (km)		Transfers	Location	
Station	Between stations	From Fukushima	Transfers	Location	
Fukushima	—N/a	0	Tōhoku Shinkansen; Yamagata Shinkansen; Yamagata Line; Tōhoku Main Line; Abukuma Express Line	Fukushima	Fukushima; Prefecture
Soneda	0.6	0.6		Fukushima	Fukushima; Prefecture
Bijutsukantoshokanmae	0.8	1.4		Fukushima	Fukushima; Prefecture
Iwashiroshimizu	1.3	2.7		Fukushima	Fukushima; Prefecture
Izumi	0.3	3.0		Fukushima	Fukushima; Prefecture
Kamimatsukawa	0.7	3.7		Fukushima	Fukushima; Prefecture
Sasaya	0.5	4.2		Fukushima	Fukushima; Prefecture
Sakuramizu	0.9	5.1		Fukushima	Fukushima; Prefecture
Hirano	1.1	6.2		Fukushima	Fukushima; Prefecture
Iohji-mae	1.2	7.4		Fukushima	Fukushima; Prefecture
Hanamizuzaka	1.3	8.7		Fukushima	Fukushima; Prefecture
Iizaka Onsen	0.5	9.2		Fukushima	Fukushima; Prefecture

== Service ==
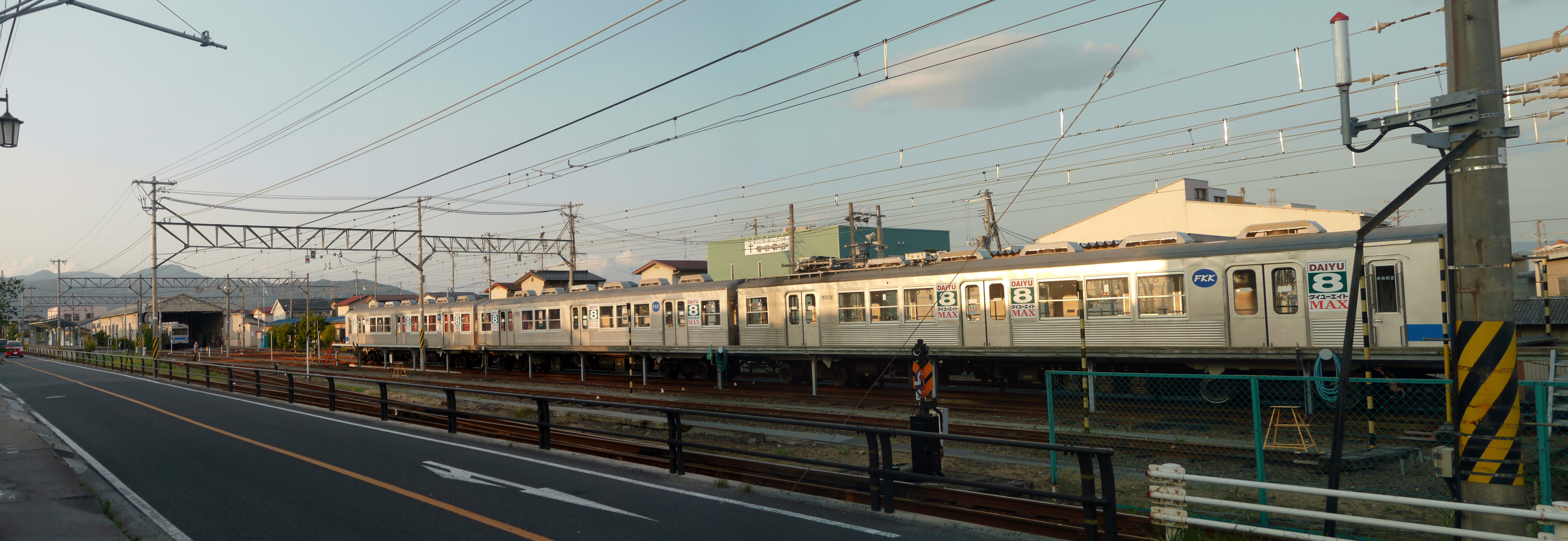
Iizaka Line's yard at Sakuramizu

While the termini of the Iizaka Line are Fukushima and Iizaka Onsen stations, all trains night at the line's rail yard located at Sakuramizu Station.

=== Service frequency ===
==== Weekdays ====
As a general rule, trains come every 20–25 minutes in the early morning, every 15 minutes in the morning, every 25 minutes in the daytime, every 15 minutes in the evening, and every 25–30 minutes at night.

==== Weekends and holidays ====
As a general rule, trains come every 20–40 minutes in the early morning, every 20 minutes in the morning, every 25 minutes in the daytime, and every 30 minutes at night.

== Rolling stock ==
- 1000 series 2/3-car EMUs (since April 2017)
- 7000 series 2/3-car EMUs

As of 1 April 2016, services on the line were operated using a fleet of four two-car and two three-car 7000 series stainless steel electric multiple unit (EMU) trains converted from former Tokyu 7000 series EMUs.

In 2017, a number of former Tokyu 1000 series cars were resold to Fukushima Transportation for use on the Iizaka Line.

The three-car sets are mainly used during the weekday morning peak hours only.

=== 7000 series ===
The 7000 series trains are formed as two- and three-car sets as follows.

==== Two-car sets ====
Designation	Mc	Mc
Numbering	DeHa 71xx	DeHa 72xx

The DeHa 7100 cars each have one lozenge-type pantograph.

==== Three-car sets ====
Designation	Mc	T	Mc
Numbering	DeHa 71xx	SaHa 73xx	DeHa 712xx

The DeHa 7100 cars each have one lozenge-type pantograph.

==== Car identities ====
The former identities of the fleet are as shown below.

Set No.	Car No.	Tokyu numbering
7101	DeHa 7101	DeHa 7126
7101	DeHa 7202	DeHa 7125
7103	DeHa 7103	DeHa 7124
7103	DeHa 7204	DeHa 7157
7105	DeHa 7105	DeHa 7158
7105	DeHa 7206	DeHa 7123
7107	DeHa 7107	DeHa 7116
7107	DeHa 7208	DeHa 7147
7109	DeHa 7109	DeHa 7148
7109	DeHa 7202	DeHa 7115
7111	DeHa 7111	DeHa 7118
7111	SaHa 7316	DeHa 7107
7111	DeHa 7212	DeHa 7117
7113	DeHa 7113	DeHa 7140
7113	SaHa 7315	DeHa 7134
7113	DeHa 7214	DeHa 7129

=== 1000 series ===
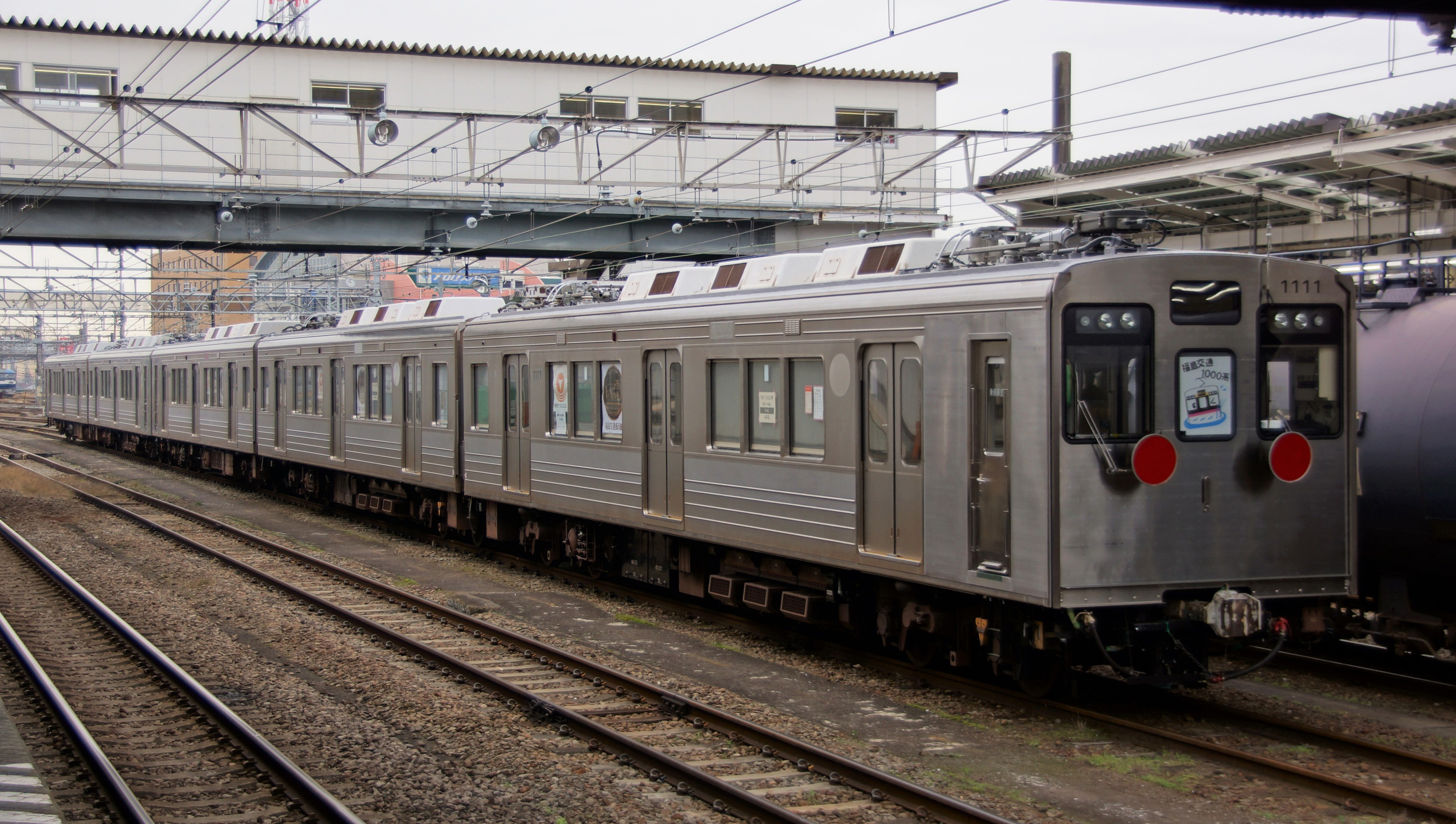
3-car set 1111 and 2-car set 1103 on delivery from Tokyu in November 2017

The 1000 series trains are formed as two- and three-car sets as follows. Two sets (one two-car and one three-car set) were converted in fiscal 2016, entering service on 1 April 2017. Two more sets (one two-car and one three-car set) are scheduled to be introduced during fiscal 2017, followed by two more two-car sets in fiscal 2018, ultimately replacing the entire fleet of 7000 trainsets.

==== Two-car sets ====
Designation	Mc	Tc
Numbering	DeHa 11xx	KuHa 12xx

==== Three-car sets ====
Designation	Mc	M	Tc
Numbering	DeHa 11xx	DeHa 13xx	KuHa 12xx

==== Car identities ====
The former identities of the fleet are as shown below.

Set No.	Car No.	Tokyu numbering
1107	DeHa 1107	DeHa 1307
1107	KuHa 1208	DeHa 1257
1109	DeHa 1109	DeHa 1308
1109	DeHa 1313	DeHa 1408
1109	KuHa 1210	DeHa 1258

== See also ==
- List of railway companies in Japan
- List of railway lines in Japan
