= Iizaka Onsen Station =

Railway station in Fukushima, Fukushima Prefecture, Japan

Iizaka Onsen Station 飯坂温泉駅
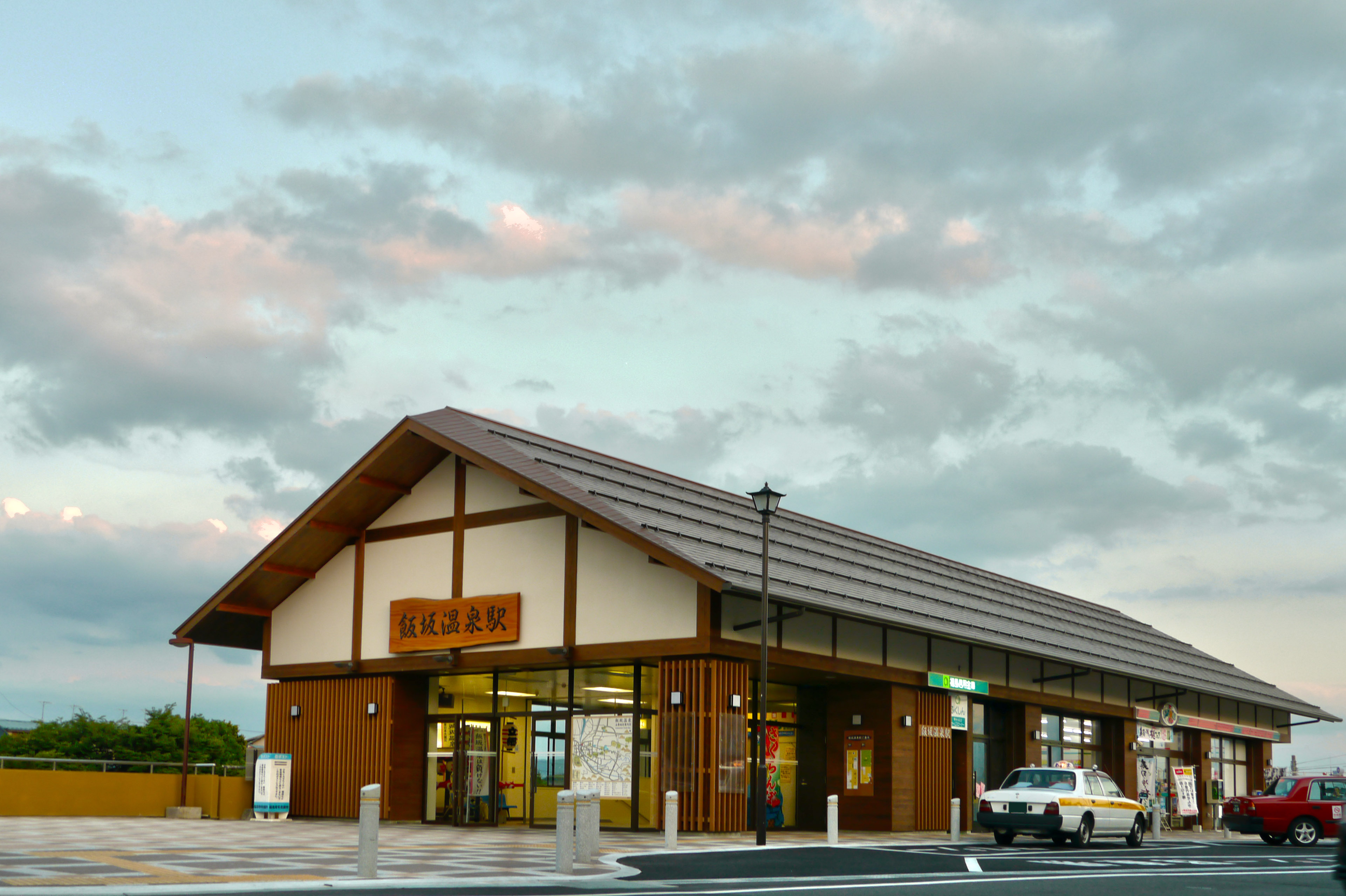
- Iizaka Onsen Station after its 2010 renovation

General information
- Location: 28, Iizaka-machi Aza Totsunashita; Fukushima; Japan
- Coordinates: 37°49′49″N 140°27′17″E
- Operator: Fukushima Transportation
- Distance: 9.2 km (5.7 mi) from Fukushima
- Platforms: 1 bay platform
- Tracks: 1
- Connections: Bus terminal

Construction
- Structure type: At-grade

Other information
- Status: Staffed
- Website: Official website

History
- Opened: 23 March 1927

Services
Preceding station	Fukushima Transportation	Following station
Hanamizuzaka towards Fukushima	Iizaka Line	Terminus
Location
- Location within Fukushima Prefecture Location within Japan

Iizaka Onsen (Japanese: 飯坂温泉駅, Hepburn: Iizaka Onsen eki) is a railway station located in the township of Iizaka in the city of Fukushima, Fukushima Prefecture, Japan operated by Fukushima Kōtsū.

== Lines ==
Iizaka Onsen Station is served by the Iizaka Line and is located 9.2 kilometres (5.7 mi) from the starting point of the line at Fukushima.

== Station layout ==
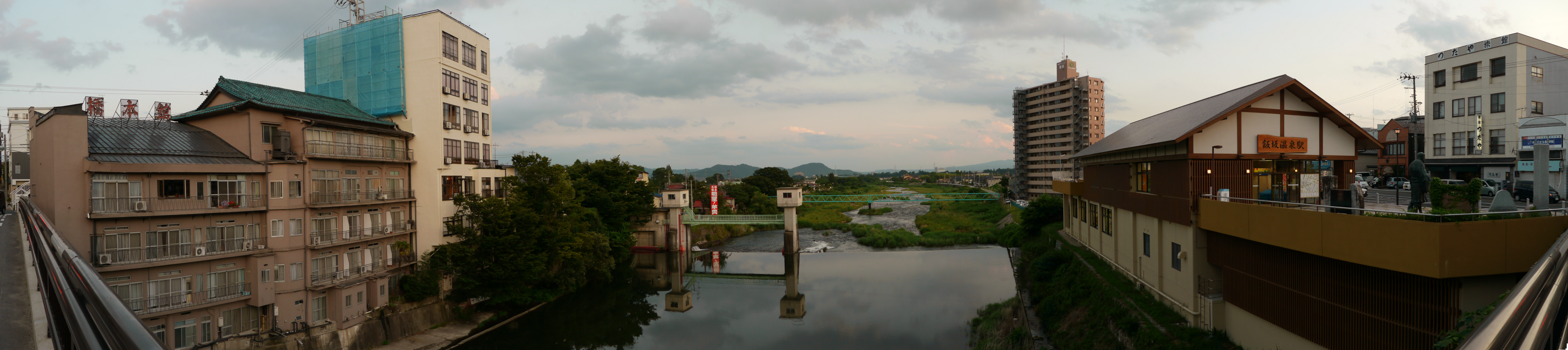
Surrounding area, including the Surikami River

Iizaka Onsen Station has two bay platforms serving a single bi-directional track. The station is staffed. Passengers generally disembark trains on the left-side platform and board from the right-side platform (left and right described when facing south (the direction of Fukushima Station)); however, during winter the left-side platform is used for both disembarking and boarding. The ground-level floor of the building contains a FamilyMart convenience store, a small vegetable shop, and a Fukushima Shinkin Bank ATM. The basement level contains the ticket gate and platforms, the station office, the waiting room, and toilets. Tickets are purchased via automated ticket machines, however tickets are checked manually by a station employee when a train's arrival/departure time is near. Generally, passengers are only allowed on the platforms when a train is present.

== History ==
The station commenced operations on 23 March 1927. From 1908 to 1967, Fukushima Kōtsū Iizaka East Line's Yuno-machi Station (湯野町駅) was a five-minute walk away, but it was shut down when the Iizaka East line closed. Iizaka Onsen Station's building was renovated in 2010, and the new look was revealed on 20 December 2010.

== Surrounding area ==
The station is located next to the Surikami River.

- Iizaka Onsen
