= Fukushima Transportation =

Rail and bus transportation company based in Fukushima City, Japan

Fukushima Transportation, Inc. 福島交通株式会社
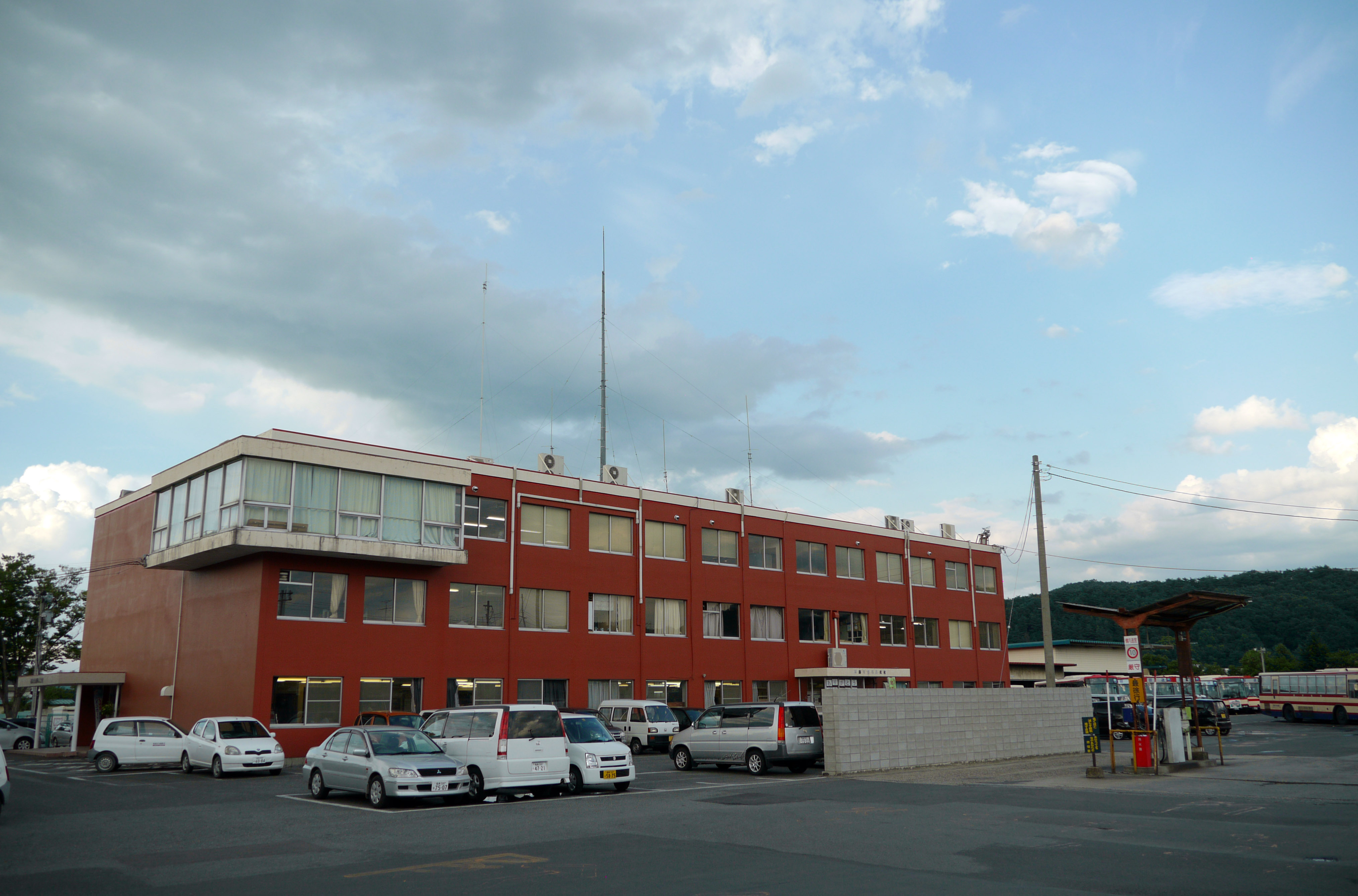

Overview
- Locale: Primary service area: Nakadōri and northern Hamadōri regions of Fukushima Prefecture; Intercity bus service: Sendai, Morioka, Niigata, Koshigaya, Tokyo, Kyoto, Osaka
- Transit type: Commuter rail, local and express bus
- Number of stations: 12 (Iizaka Line)
- Chief executive: Jun Matsumoto (executive director)
- Headquarters: Fukushima, Fukushima, Japan
- Website: https://www.fukushima-koutu.co.jp/

Operation
- Began operation: July 9, 1986

Technical
- System length: 9.2 km (5.7 mi) via rail 3,474.03 km (2,158.66 mi) via automobile

Fukushima Transportation, Inc. (福島交通株式会社, Fukushima Kōtsū Kabushiki-gaisha) is a rail and bus transportation company headquartered in Fukushima City, Fukushima Prefecture, Japan.

It operates the Iizaka Line rail line and an extensive bus network, which primarily serves the Nakadōri and northern section of the Hamadōri regions of Fukushima Prefecture.

It has been owned by Michinori Holdings since 2008.

== History ==
=== Founding and initial growth ===
Fukushima Transportation can trace its roots back to the founding of Shintatsu Tramway (信達軌道, Shintatsu Kidō) on August 1, 1907. The company opened up lines connecting Fukushima to Iizaka and Date, and in 1908 Shintatsu Tramway, along with various other regional railways, were brought together under the newly formed Dainippon Tramway (大日本軌道, Dainippon Kidō). Shintatsu Tramway became the Fukushima branch of the newly formed company.

Over the next nine years, routes connecting Hobara, Yanagawa, and Kakeda were completed.

In 1917 Shintatsu Tramway reformed as a new entity, and in January of the following year the new Shintatsu Tramway took control of the Fukushima branch of the Dainippon Tramway. The rail network was then further expanded to include Koori and Matsukawa.

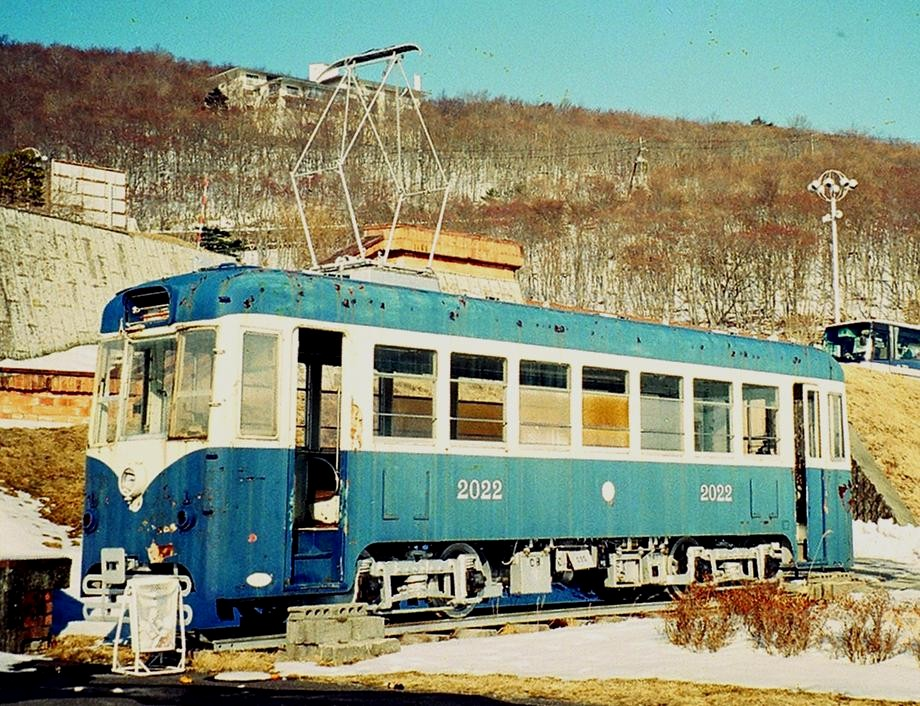
Iizaka East Line 2022 tram, preserved at Nasu Royal Center in Nasu, Tochigi

In 1926 the company's name was changed to Fukushima Electric Railway (福島電気鉄道, Fukushima Denki Tetsudō), and in 1927 it merged with Iizaka Railway (飯坂電車, Iizaka Densha). As a result of the merge, the tracks that led directly from Fukushima Station to Iizaka were renamed to Iizaka West Line and the track that led from Fukushima Station to Iizaka via an eastern loop of Fukushima City was renamed to Iizaka East Line.

=== Diversification from rail ===
Over the next few decades Fukushima Electric Railway added and expanded multiple bus routes throughout the area. As a result of the company's increasing foray into non-rail transportation, in 1962 the company was renamed to Fukushima Transportation (福島交通, Fukushima Kōtsū). In 1967 a section of the Iizaka East Line was shut down, and in 1971 the entirety of the Iizaka East Line was shut down, leaving the Iizaka West Line (now called the Iizaka Line) Fukushima Transportation's only remaining rail line in operation.

The company rapidly expanded in the 1970s, becoming one of the three pillars of the Fukushima Transportation Group (福島交通グループ, Fukushima Kōtsū Gurūpu) conglomerate. In addition to the other two pillars, Radio Fukushima and The Fukkushima Minpo newspaper, the group had its hands in various other ventures, such as real estate, transport, breweries, the Nasu Royal Center (那須ロイアルセンター) amusement park, and a ranch.

=== Financial troubles and acquisition ===
In the 1980s the company continued to diversify, taking on large amounts of debt. Weighted down by an increase in unprofitable ventures, in 1986 the company merged with its Fukushima Transportation Real Estate (福島交通不動産) subsidiary, thus having its former subsidiary assume the company's debt. Following the merger, New Fukushima Transportation (新福島交通, Shin-Fukushima Kōtsū) was spun off, with its name being changed to Fukushima Transportation (福島交通, Fukushima Kōtsū) soon after.

Entering the 2000s, passenger levels and profits fell due to a decreasing population and the resulting decreasing demand, in addition to the increased competition due to relaxation of regulations in the bus industry and the resulting increased competition. Furthermore, there was an unexpectedly high number of employees taking early retirement and requesting retirement payments, all of which led to Fukushima Transportation having increasingly stretched finances.

Entering into 2008, the company began considerations into filing for bankruptcy protection, however this was put off following a 160 million yen subsidy from the national and prefectural governments. April 11, 2008 the Tokyo District Court approved a petition for corporate reorganization under the Japanese Corporate Rehabilitation Law.

The following year restructuring plans were agreed upon with Industrial Growth Platform, Inc (株式会社経営共倉基盤, Kabushiki-gaisha Keiei Kyōsō Kiban), and Fukushima Transportation became a fully owned subsidiary of Michinori Holdings (みちのりホールディングス), a holding company owned by Industrial Growth Platform.

=== 2011 earthquake and tsunami ===
In the wake of the 2011 Tōhoku earthquake and tsunami, due to gasoline shortages and JR East being forced to cancel many of its rail services in the Tōhoku region, intercity travel became extremely difficult. In response to the need to restore intercity transportation to affected areas, Fukushima Transportation put special bus routes into effect throughout both Fukushima Prefecture and Tōhoku.

Fukushima Transportation's rail service, the Iizaka Line, resumed service on March 13, two days after the earthquake.

== Rail operations ==
=== Current ===
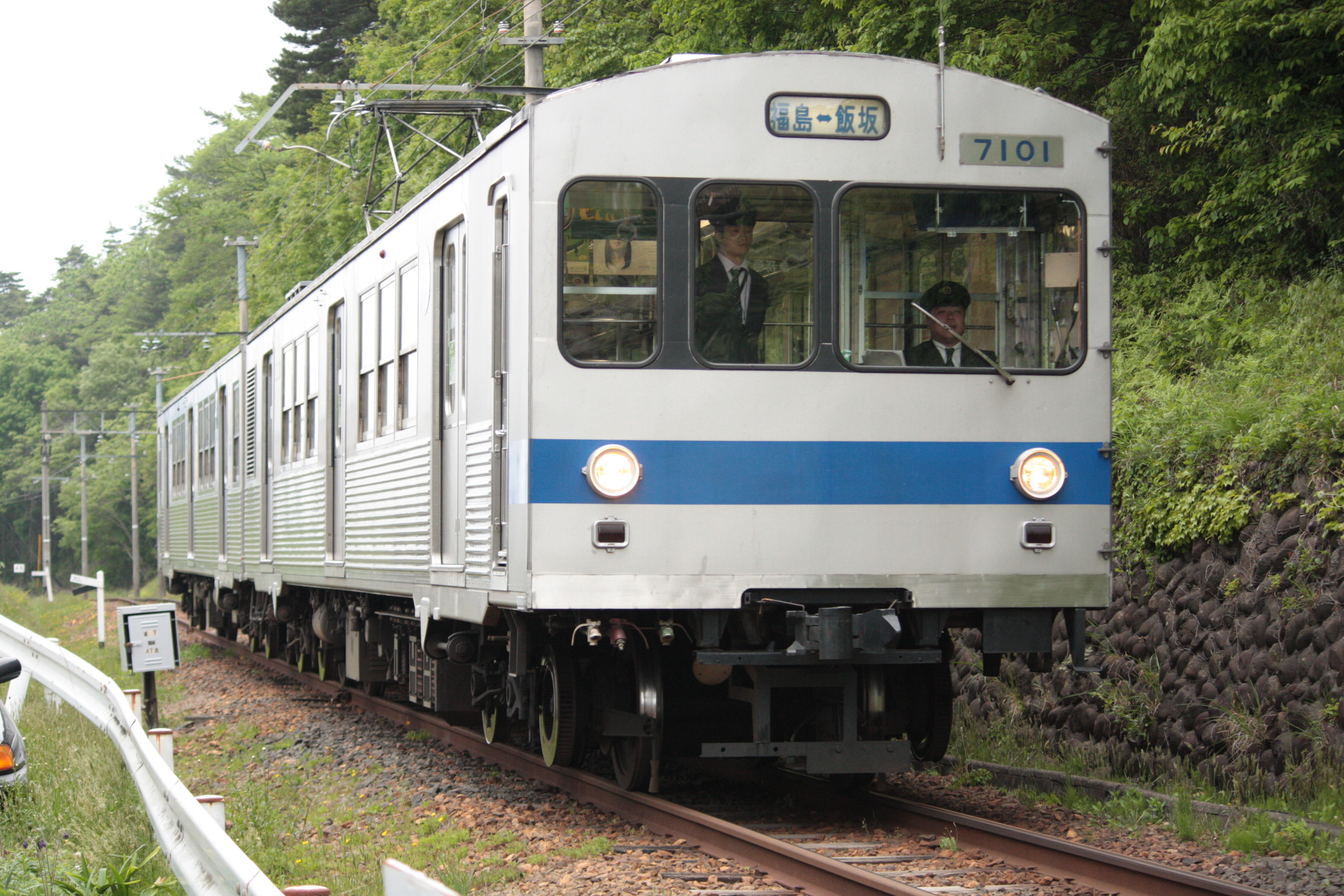
Former Tokyu 7000 series operating on the Iizaka Line

Fukushima Transportation currently operates the Iizaka Line, a 9.2 km rail line which links the center of the city of Fukushima to Iizaka in the northern part of the city. Since 1991, the Iizaka Line has run former Tokyu 7000 series cars. Beginning 2017, a number of former Tokyu 1000 series cars were resold to Fukushima Transportation for use on the Iizaka Line.

=== Past ===
Fukushima Transportation operated the Iizaka East Line until the line's closure on April 12, 1971

== Bus Operations ==
=== Local buses ===
==== Company-owned routes ====
In the 1960s and 1970s Fukushima Transportation greatly expanded its local bus system into all of Naka-dōri and the northern area of Hama-dōri, however in the 1980s passenger numbers began to fall, leading many of the bus lines into unprofitability. As a result, unprofitable lines were either closed, shortened, or reorganized. Some routes were subsidized by local governments under section 21 of the 1951 Road Transportation Act.

==== Contracted routes ====
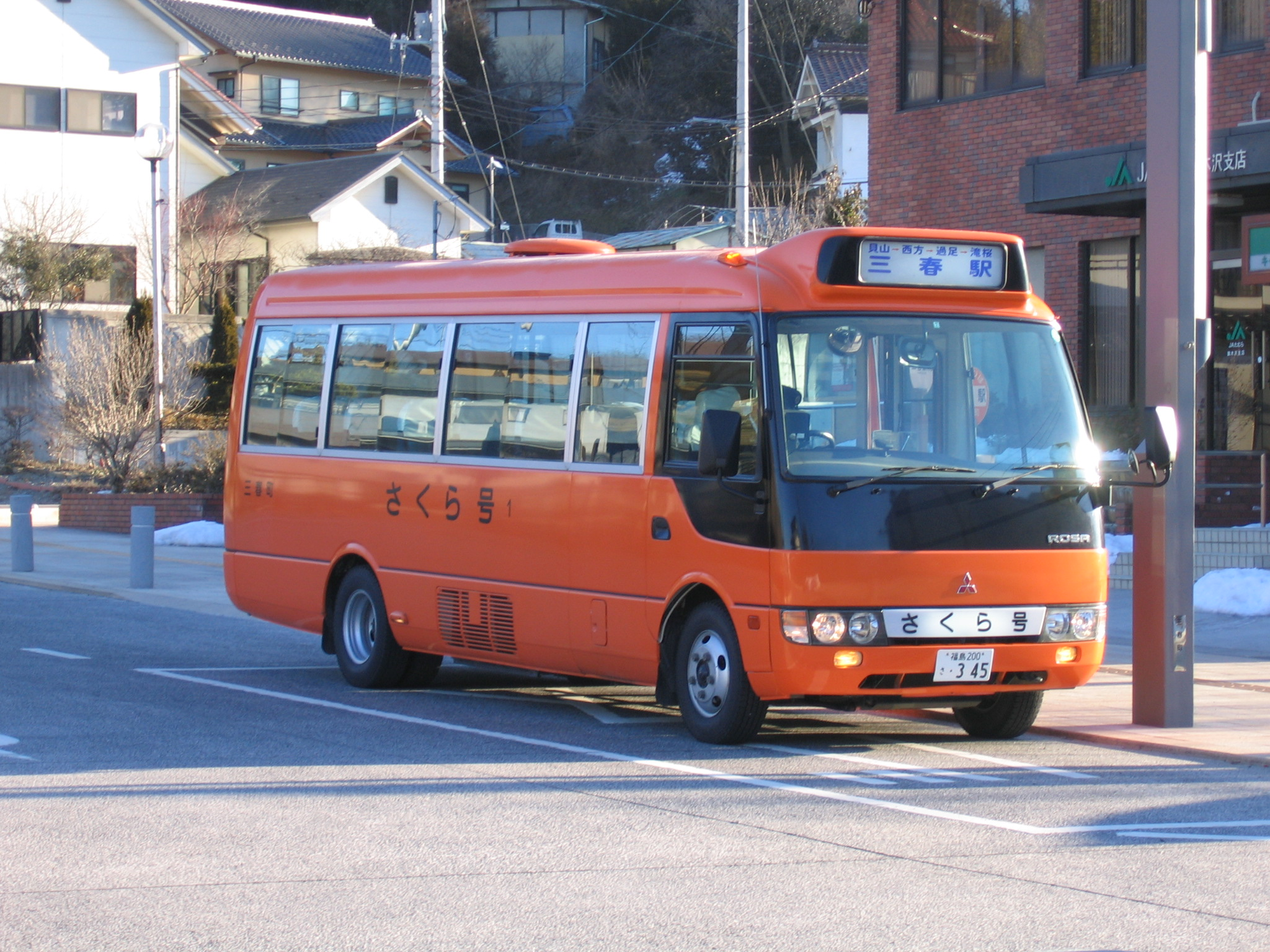
The Sakura-gō bus in Miharu, operated by Fukushima Transportation

The municipalities of Miharu and Nishigō have contracted out various bus operations to Fukushima Transportation.

=== Intercity buses ===
Fukushima Transportation operates intercity bus routes that connect the cities of Fukushima, Kōriyama, Iwaki and Aizuwakamtsu within Fukushima Prefecture. Furthermore, it runs lines that connect Fukushima and Kōriyama to Koshigaya, Sendai, Tokyo, Narita, Niigata, Nagoya, Kyoto and Osaka.

=== Bus fleet ===
Fukushima Transportation formerly owned and operated buses solely made by the Mitsubishi Fuso Truck and Bus Corporation. However, in 2009, it purchased new Isuzu and Hino Motors vehicles and used Nissan Diesel vehicles, thus ending the longstanding practice of relying only on Mitsubishi Fuso vehicles.

==== Selection of buses operated ====
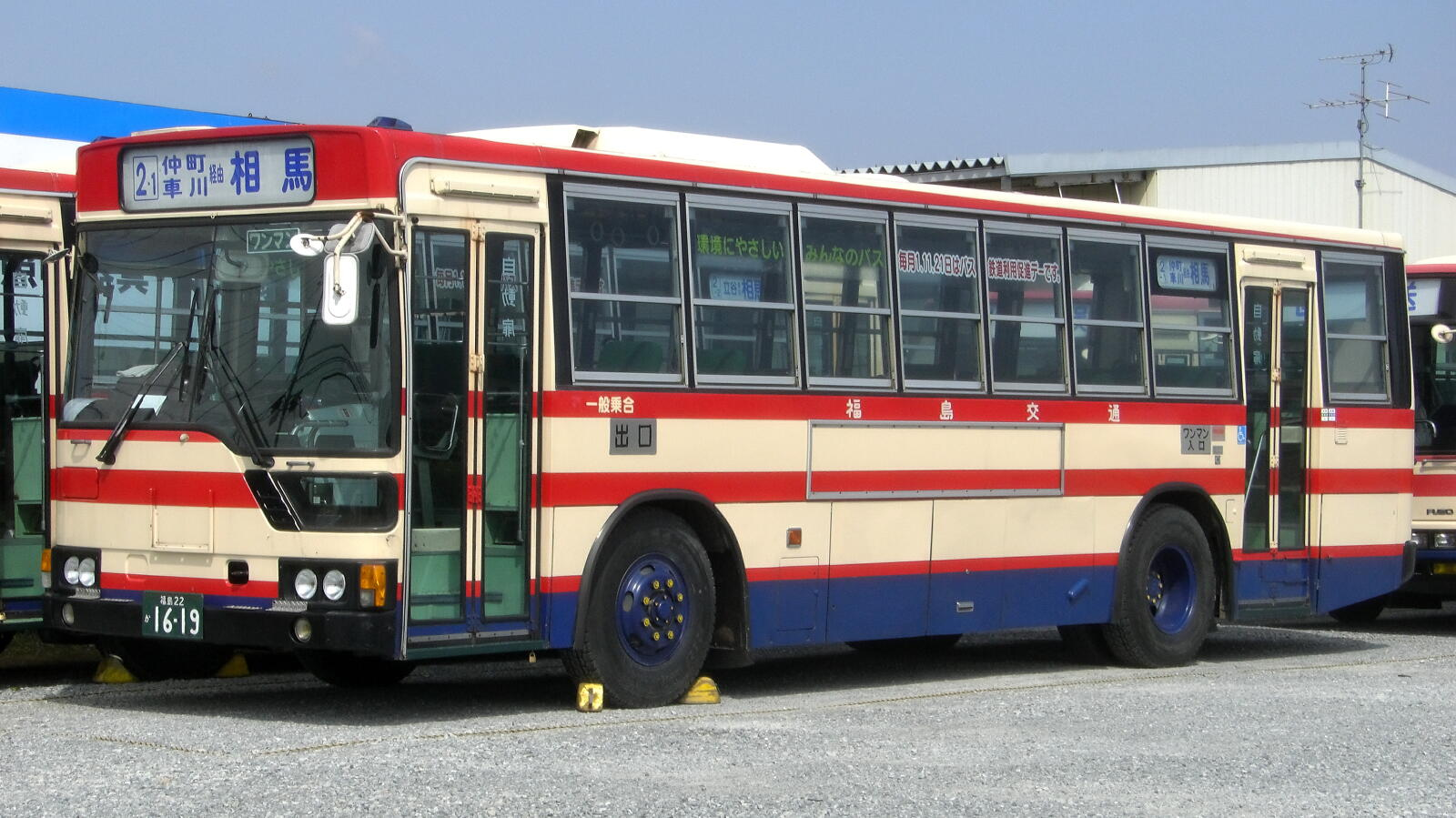
P-MP218K for large-sized bus routes

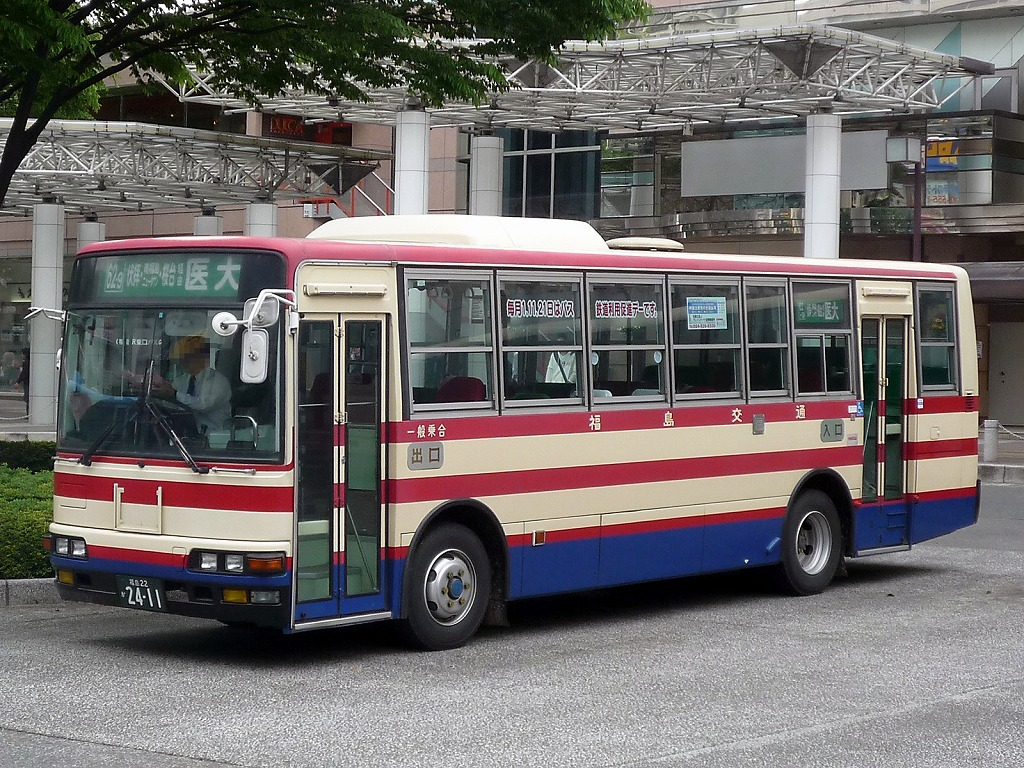
KC-MK219J for medium-sized bus routes

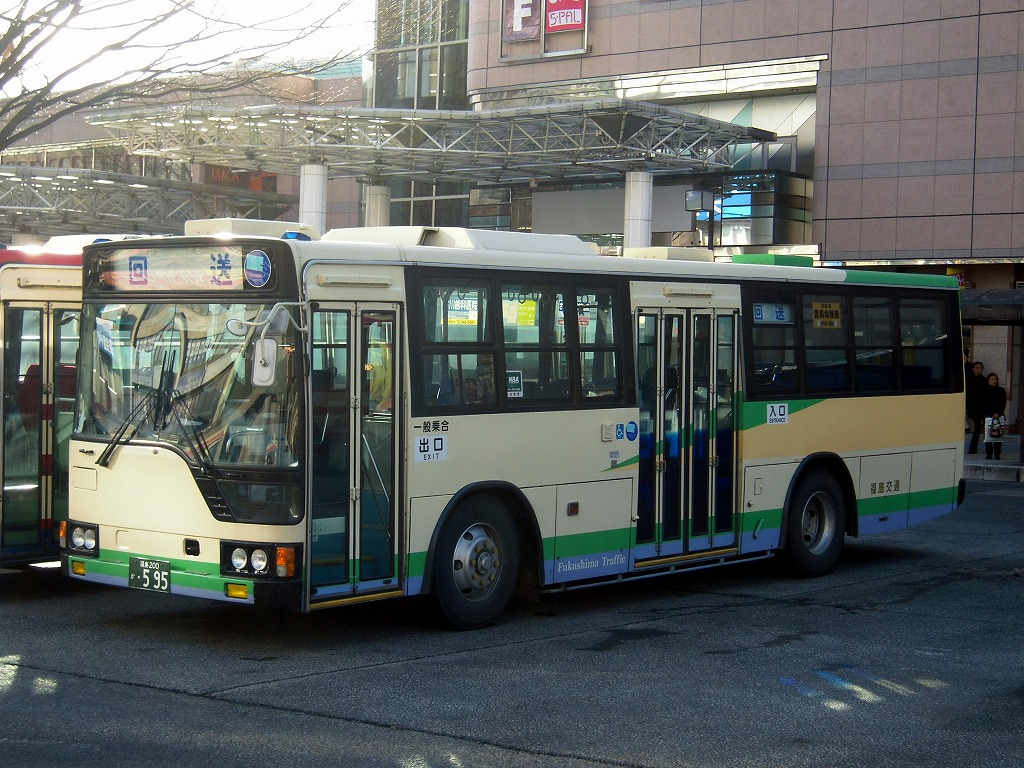
U-MP218K purchased used from Toei Bus

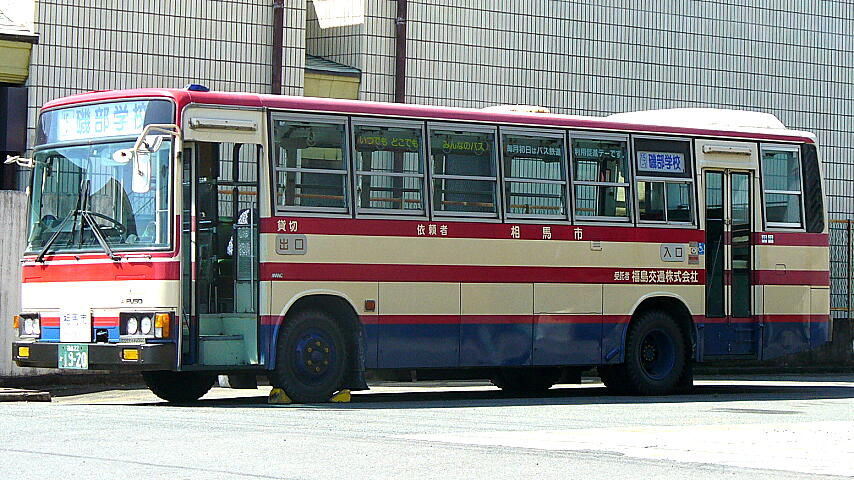
P-MK117J subsidized by the city of Sōma

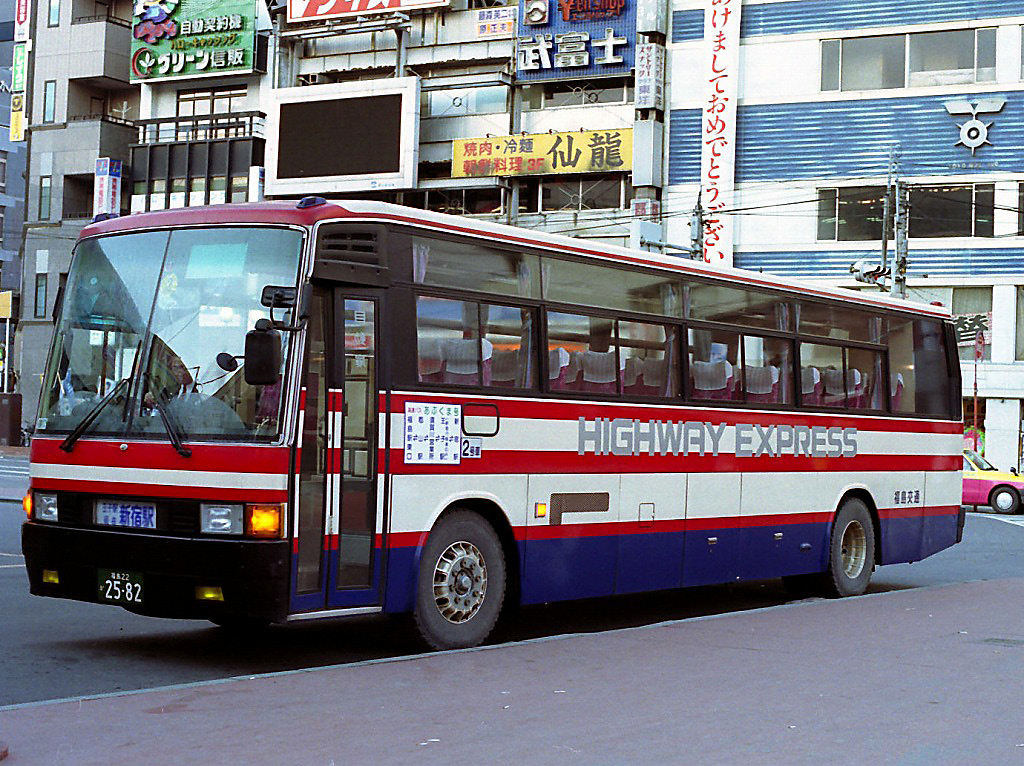
Revised P-MS725SA intercity bus, purchased from JR Bus Kanto Company

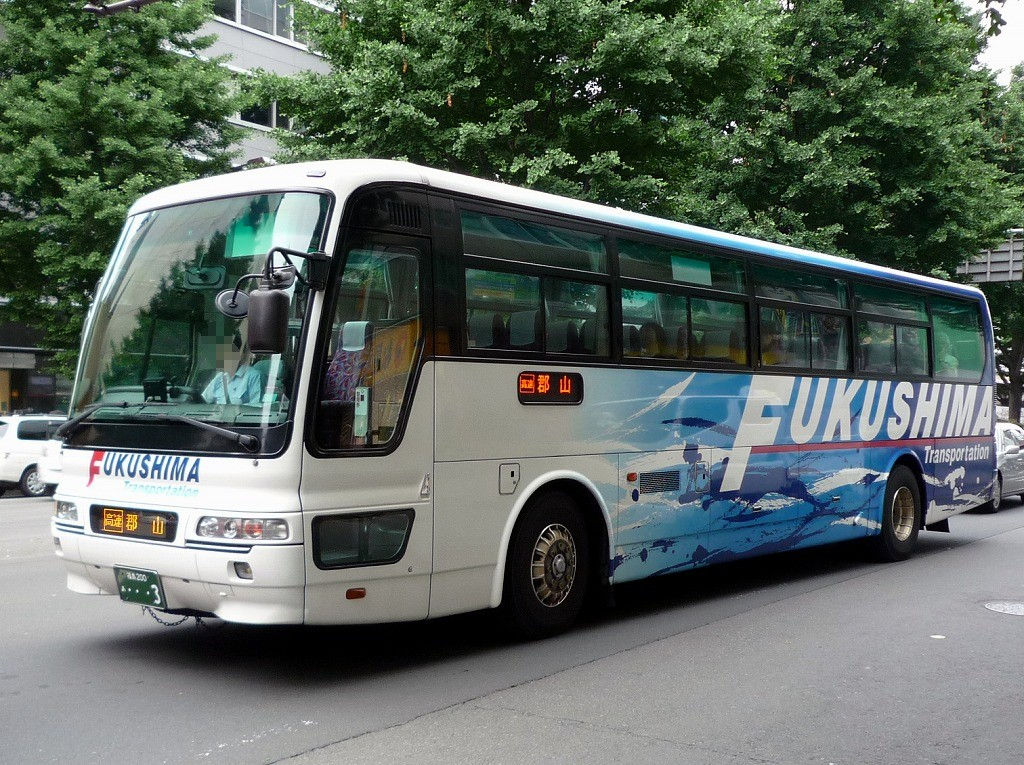
KL-MS86MP intercity bus on the Kōriyama to Sendai route

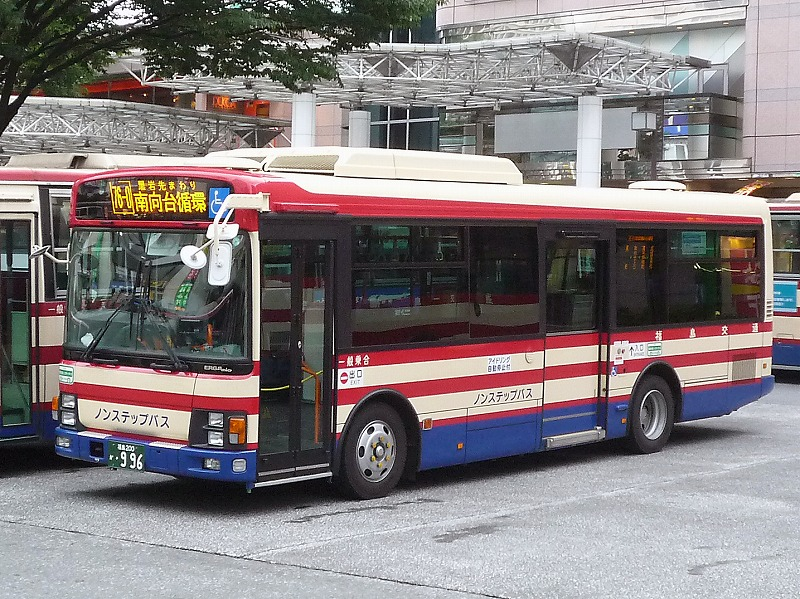
Isuzu Erga Mio, the first Isuzu bus purchased by Fukushima Transportation

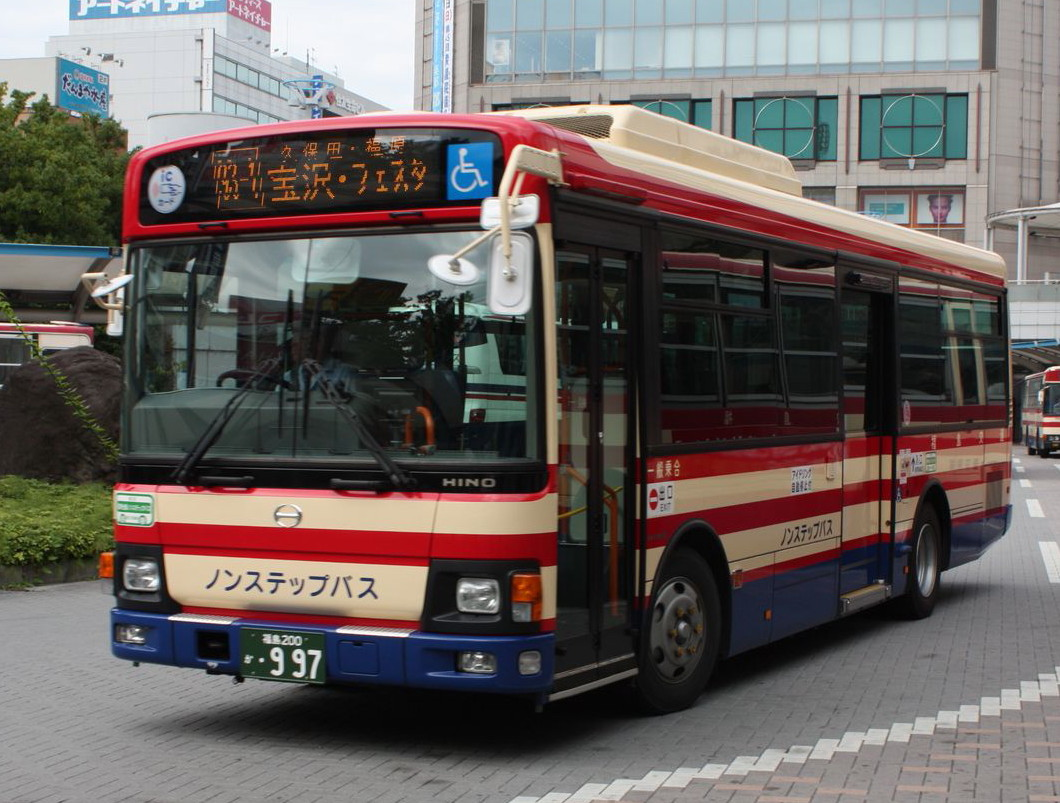
Hino Rainbow II, the first Hino bus purchased by Fukushima Transportation

== See also ==
- Fukushima Kōtsū Iizaka Line
- List of bus operating companies in Japan (east)
- List of railway companies in Japan
- Michinori Holdings
