= Fukushima Station (Fukushima) =

Railway station in Fukushima, Japan

Fukushima Station 福島駅
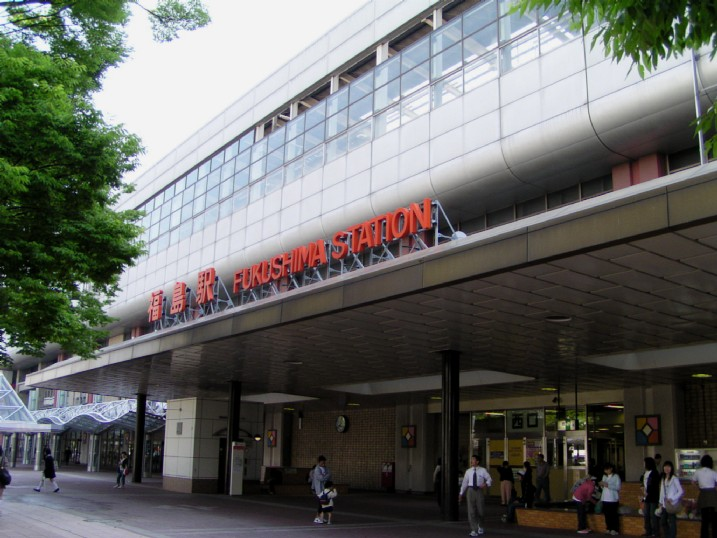
- The west side of Fukushima Station

General information
- Location: 1-1 Sakaemachi; Fukushima; Japan
- Coordinates: 37°45′15″N 140°27′34″E
- Owner: JR East
- Lines: Tōhoku Shinkansen; Ōu Main Line; Tōhoku Main Line; Abukuma Express Line; Iizaka Line
- Platforms: 5 island platforms, 1 side platform, 1 bay platform
- Train operators: Abukuma Express; Fukushima Transportation; JR East

Other information
- Status: Staffed (Midori no Madoguchi)
- Website: Official website

History
- Opened: December 15, 1887; 138 years ago

Passengers
- FY2023: 14,292 (JR) daily

Services
Preceding station	JR East	Following station
Kōriyama towards Tokyo	Tōhoku Shinkansen Yamabiko	Shiroishi-Zaō towards Morioka
Kōriyama towards Tokyo	Yamagata Shinkansen Tsubasa	Yonezawa towards Shinjō
Terminus	Tōhoku Main Line Rapid City Rabbit	Higashi-Fukushima towards Sendai
Minami-Fukushima towards Kuroiso	Tōhoku Main Line Local	Higashi-Fukushima towards Morioka
Terminus	Yamagata Line	Sasakino towards Shinjō
Preceding station	Abukuma Express	Following station
Terminus	Abukuma Express Line	Oroshimachi toward Tsukinoki
Preceding station	Fukushima Transportation	Following station
Terminus	Iizaka Line	Soneda towards Iizaka Onsen
Location
- Location within Fukushima Prefecture Location within Japan

Fukushima Station (Japanese: 福島駅, Hepburn: Fukushima-eki) is a railway station in the city of Fukushima in Fukushima Prefecture, Japan operated by the East Japan Railway Company (JR East). The station is located on JR East's Tōhoku Shinkansen and Tōhoku Main Line and is the terminus of the company's Yamagata Shinkansen and Yamagata Line. It also serves as the terminus of the third-sector Abukuma Express Line and privately operated Fukushima Kōtsū Iizaka Line.

== Lines ==
- JR East
  - Tohoku Shinkansen
  - Yamagata Shinkansen
  - Tōhoku Main Line
  - Ōu Main Line
- Abukuma Express
  - Abukuma Express Line
- Fukushima Transportation
  - Iizaka Line

== Station layout ==
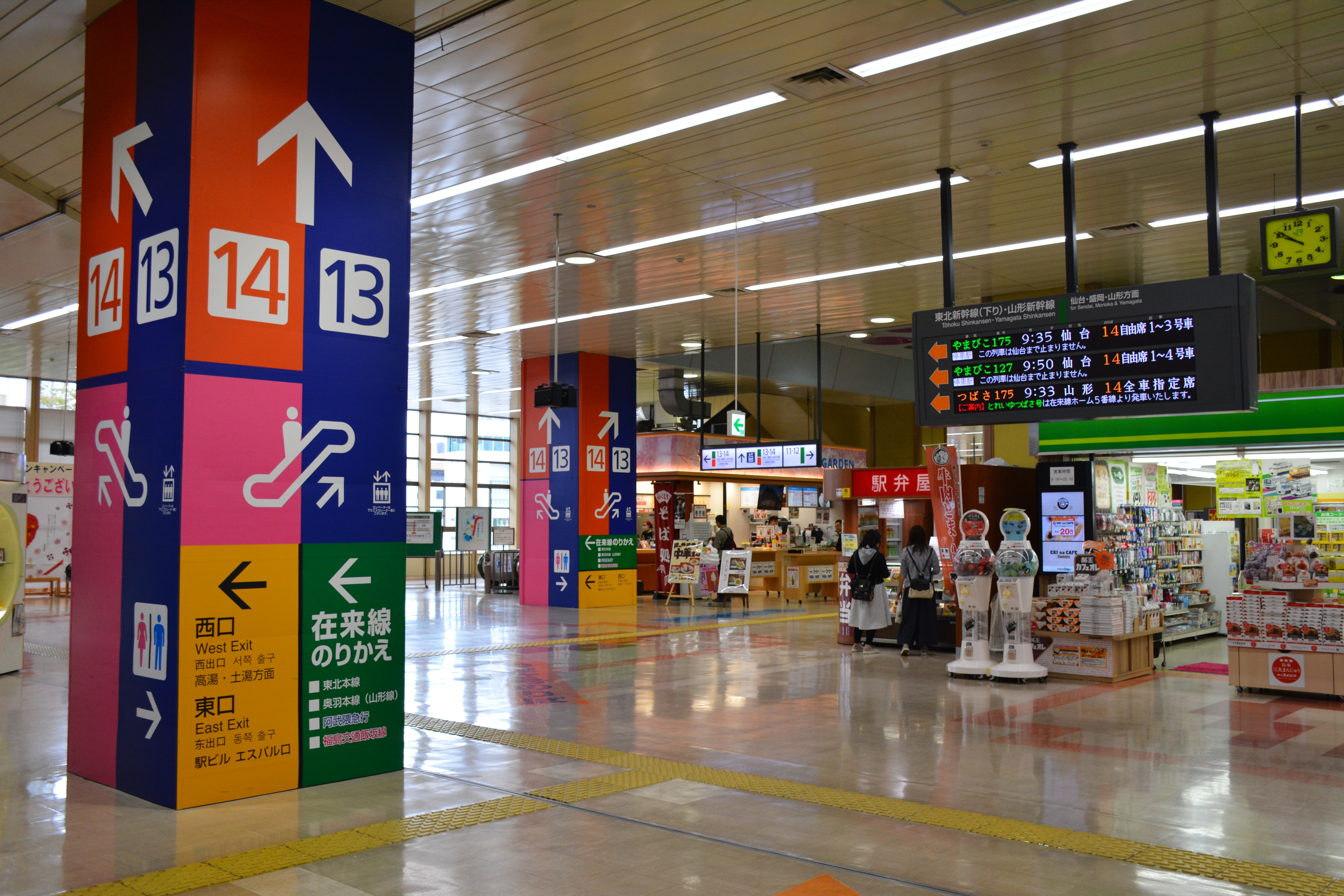
The interior of the station

The station is separated into an east and a west section. After entering the ticket gates, the opposite sections of the station are accessible via a pedestrian tunnel that runs over the tracks. Outside of the ticketed area, pedestrians must use a tunnel to access the opposite section. Cyclists and other vehicles must utilize the bridges to either the north or south of the station.

All lines, except for the Abukuma Express Line and the Iizaka Line, are accessible through the main entrance of the East or West sections of the station. The Abukuma Express Line and the Iizaka Line have a separate entrance on the Northeast side of the station.

The JR portion of the station uses one side platform, one island platform and one bay platform to serve a total of six tracks for regular trains, and two elevated island platforms for Shinkansen operations. The station has a Midori no Madoguchi staffed ticket office. The Abukuma Express Line and the Fukushima Kōtsū Iizaka Line share a single island platform.

Platform No	Line Name	Direction
JR East Platforms
1-4	■ Tohoku Main Line	for Nihonmatsu and Koriyama for Shiroishi and Sendai
5/6	■ Yamagata Line (Ōu Main Line)	for Yamagata and Shinjō
11	Tohoku Shinkansen	(Extra Platform)
12	Tohoku Shinkansen	for Utsunomiya, Omiya and Tokyo
13	Tohoku Shinkansen	for Sendai and Morioka
14	Tohoku Shinkansen	for Sendai and Morioka
14	Yamagata Shinkansen (Ōu Main Line)	for Yamagata and Shinjo
14	Tohoku Shinkansen	for Utsunomiya, Omiya and Tokyo
Abukuma Express/Iizaka Line Platform
	■ Abukuma Express Line	for Yanagawa, Marumori and Tsukinoki
	■ Iizaka Line	for Iizaka Onsen

== History ==
Nippon Railway opened Fukushima Station and the railway between Kōriyama Station and Shiogama Station (later called Shiogamakō Station) on December 15, 1887. This railway was later nationalized and named the Tōhoku Main Line. The government railways opened the railway, later named the Ōu Main Line, between Fukushima Station and Yonezawa Station on May 15, 1899. The Iizaka Line was opened on April 13, 1924 by Fukushima Iizaka Electric Tramway (福島飯坂電気軌道, Fukushima Iizaka Denki Kidō). The Tōhoku Shinkansen opened on June 23, 1982 and the Abukuma Express Line opened on July 1, 1988.

Through services between the Tōhoku Shinkansen and the Ōu Main Line, under the name Yamagata Shinkansen, began on July 1, 1992.

JR East announced in March 2020 that it would build a new approach line for the Yamagata Shinkansen at Fukushima Station to resolve a bottleneck on the Tōhoku Shinkansen. Southbound Yamabiko services bound for Tokyo, which couple with Tsubasa services, were required to cross the northbound main line twice to access Platform 14, the only platform connected to the Yamagata Shinkansen. The project will construct a second connecting track with approximately 760 metres (2,490 ft) of surface track and 540 metres (1,770 ft) of elevated viaduct, branching from the Ōu Main Line, passing beneath the elevated Shinkansen, and connecting directly to the southbound track at Platform 11. The project eliminates at-grade crossings that can delay northbound non-stop Hayabusa services and enables simultaneous arrivals and departures, improving operational flexibility and timetable recovery. Completion is scheduled for 2026.

== Bus terminals ==
=== Highway buses ===
- For Minamisōma, Haranomachi Station, Kashima Station (Fukushima)
- For Sōma
- For Nihonmatsu, Koriyama Women's University, Kōriyama Station
- For Nihonmatsu, Ono, Iwaki Station, Iwaki-Taira Velodrome
- For Nihonmatsu, Aizu-Wakamatsu Station, Aizuwakamatsu Castle
- For Sendai Station (Miyagi)
- Abukuma; For Ōji Station (Tokyo), Ikebukuro Station, Shinjuku Station
- For Narita International Airport
- Dream Fukushima/Yokohama; For Tokyo Station and Yokohama Station
- Rainbow; For Tokyo Station and Hamamatsuchō Bus Terminal
- Galaxy; For Kyōto Station, Ōsaka Station, Ōsaka Namba Station(Osaka City Air Terminal), Ōsaka Abenobashi Station and Universal Studios Japan

== Passenger statistics ==
In fiscal year 2016, the station was used by an average of 16,536 passengers daily (boarding passengers only). In fiscal year 2023, the average number of passengers decreased to 14,292 daily.

== See also ==
- List of railway stations in Japan
