= Hamadōri =

Hamadōri 浜通り
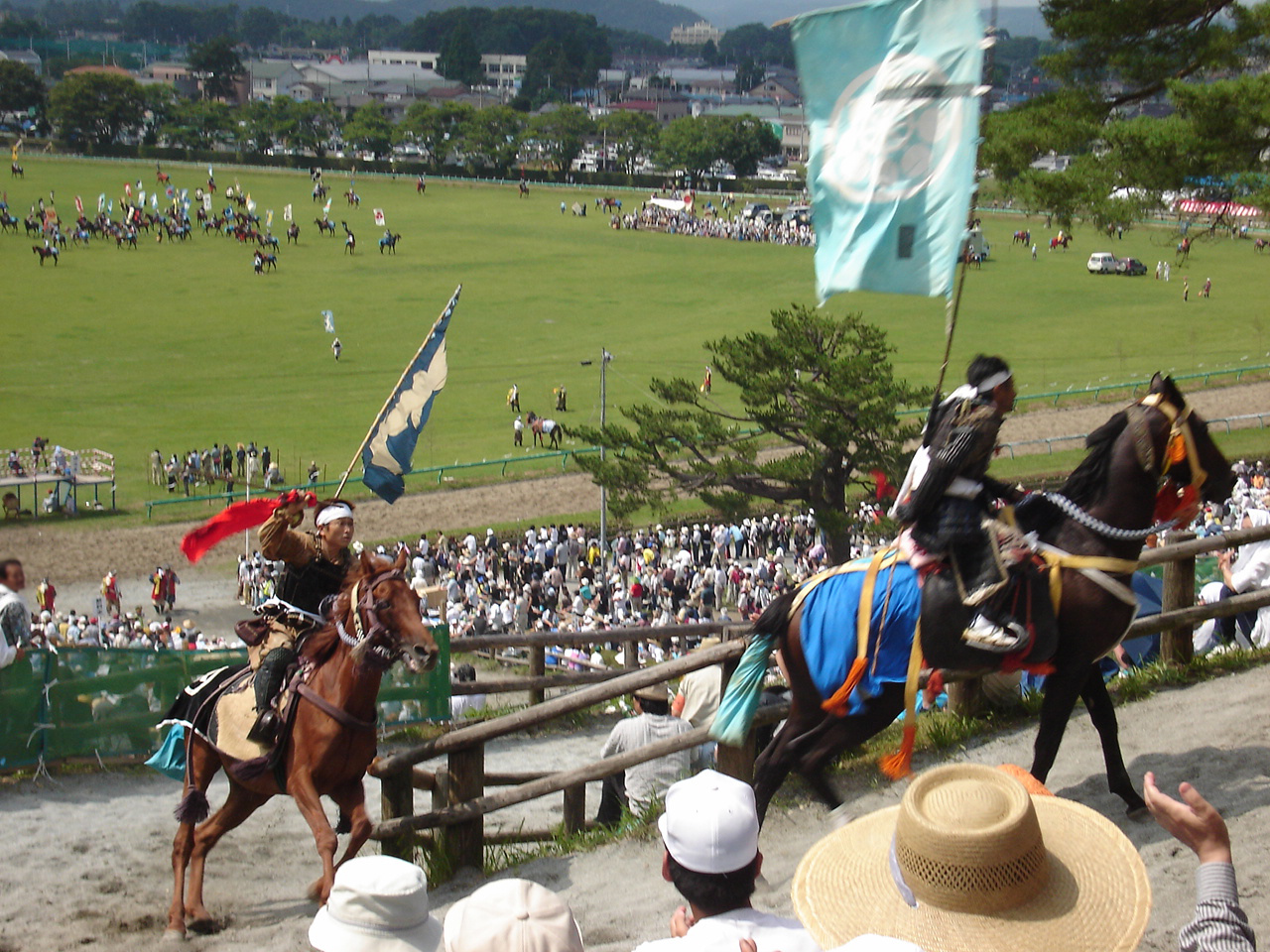
- Riders at the Sōma-nomaoi festival, which is held annually in northern Hamadōri

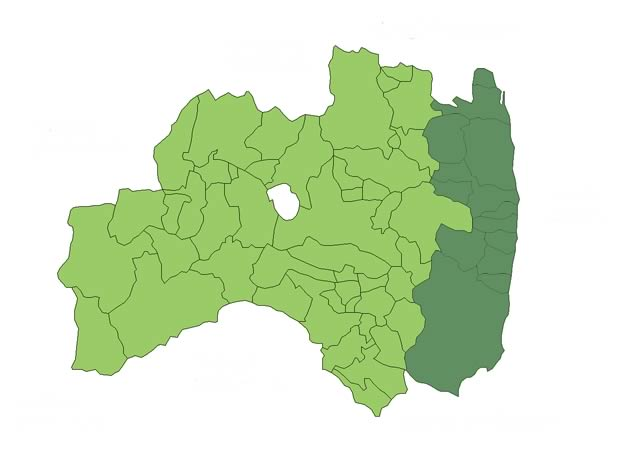
- Hamadōri comprises the eastern third of Fukushima Prefecture
- Country: Japan
- Prefecture: Fukushima

Area
  - Total: 2,969.11 km^{2} (1,146.38 sq mi)

Population (1 October 2017)
  - Total: 452,588
  - Density: 152.432/km^{2} (394.798/sq mi)

Hamadōri (浜通り) is the easternmost of the three regions of Fukushima Prefecture, Japan. The other two are Nakadōri in the central area of the prefecture and Aizu in the west. Hamadōri is bordered by the Abukuma Highlands to the west and the Pacific Ocean to the east.

The principal city of the area is Iwaki.

== Overview ==
In ancient Japan, the area currently known as Hamadōri served as a connecting route on the so-called Kaidō (海道, "Sea Road") route from Kinai in the central area of the country to Mutsu Province in northeastern Japan. The region that the road traversed also came to be known as Kaidō.

Following the implementation of the Ritsuryō system, the route's name was changed to Tōkaidō (東海道, "East Sea Road"). Despite the newly named Tōkaidō route extending up to Taga Castle in present-day Miyagi Prefecture, the region known as Tōkaidō extended only as far as the northernmost border of Hitachi Province, and the area of Hamadōri was considered a part of the Tōsandō region.

Following the conclusion of the Boshin War, the eastern section of present-day Fukushima Prefecture split off from Mutsu Province and formed Iwaki Province, the area of which included the Shirakawa District and the southern portion of modern-day Miyagi Prefecture, which the Shirakawa clan and Date clan, respectively, conquered during the Sengoku period.

The Kaidō/Tōkaidō route has been used continuously since the times of ancient Japan and into the modern age, with National Route 6, the Jōban Expressway, and the Jōban Line all beginning in Tokyo and running north along the route.

Compared to the cities of the Sōma Domain in the northern area of present-day Hamadōri, Taira, in the south, was more developed due to it having had a longer history of being a political center, its close proximity to Tokyo, and its higher population and levels of commerce. Due to these reasons, Hamadōri is also sometimes subdivided into Iwaki (いわき) to refer to the city of Iwaki in the south and Sōsō (相双) to refer to the cities in Futaba District and the former Sōma Domain the north.

== Geography and climate ==
Hamadōri is part of the Japanese Pacific Climate Zone, shown here in light green

Hamadōri, which can be literally translated to “coastal path”, makes up the eastern third of Fukushima Prefecture and comprises the entirety of the prefecture's Pacific Ocean coastal region.

The eastern section of Hamadōri is largely coastal plains sandwiched between the Pacific Ocean to the east and the Abukuma Highlands to the west. Hamadōri extends to the west until the Abukuma Highlands' ridge, which forms the border with Nakadōri.

Hamadōri belongs to Japan's Pacific Climate Zone, and seasonal winds from the Sea of Japan are largely blocked by the Ōu Mountains and the Abukuma Highlands, leading to mild winters with little snowfall.

=== Rivers ===
- Asami River
- Natsui River
- Same River
- Uda River
- Ukedo River

=== Lakes ===
- Lake Kashiko
- Matsukawa Lagoon

=== Highlands ===
- Abukuma Highlands

=== Hot springs ===
- Iwaki Yumoto Onsen

== History ==
=== Ancient Japan ===
It is said that in ancient Japan, present-day Hamadōri was in the possession of the Iwaki no Kuni no miyatsuko (石城国造). Shortly following the organization of a national government through the Ritsuryō system, Iwaki Province was founded in 718 then approximately a decade later was absorbed into Mutsu Province.

=== Heian period to the Meiji Restoration ===
Near the end of the Heian period, the Iwaki clan, having connections to Hiraizumi, built a base in Iinodaira, which is now a part of the present-day city of Iwaki. There they built the Shiramizu Amidadō temple and held power over the southern section of Hamadōri.

Entering into the Kamakura period, the Sōma clan moved from Nagareyama in present-day Chiba Prefecture to the northern area of Hamadōri and gained control over the former Iwaki Province's districts of Uda, Namekata, and Shineha.

During the Sengoku period, Hamadōri served as a buffer zone between the Satake clan, based in modern-day Ibaraki Prefecture, and the Date clan, which had control over present-day Miyagi Prefecture, north-central Fukushima Prefecture, and southern Yamagata Prefecture.

In the Battle of Sekigahara the Iwaki clan fought for the western side, however after the western army was defeated the Iwaki clan was exiled and fled to Yurihonjō, Akita. Following the exile of the Iwaki clan, southern Hamadōri became the Iwakidaira Domain. Control of the Iwakidaira Domain subsequently repeatedly switched back and forth between the Torii clan and the Andō clan.

Meanwhile, in northern Hamadōri the Sōma and Date clans came to an agreement, with the Sōma clan being granted continued rule over the lands, with the name changed to the Sōma Domain. It was during this time in the Edo period that Sōma's famed specialty product, Sōma-yaki pottery, began to be developed.

=== Meiji Restoration to the present ===
Following the Meiji Restoration, the feudal domain system was abolished and the prefecture system was established. In line with this, the Iwakidaira, Sōma, and Tanagura domains were combined into a new Iwaki Province which was later changed to Iwasaki Prefecture in 1875. The following year, on August 21, 1876, Iwasaki Prefecture merged with Fukushima Prefecture and Wakamatsu Prefecture to form present-day Fukushima Prefecture.

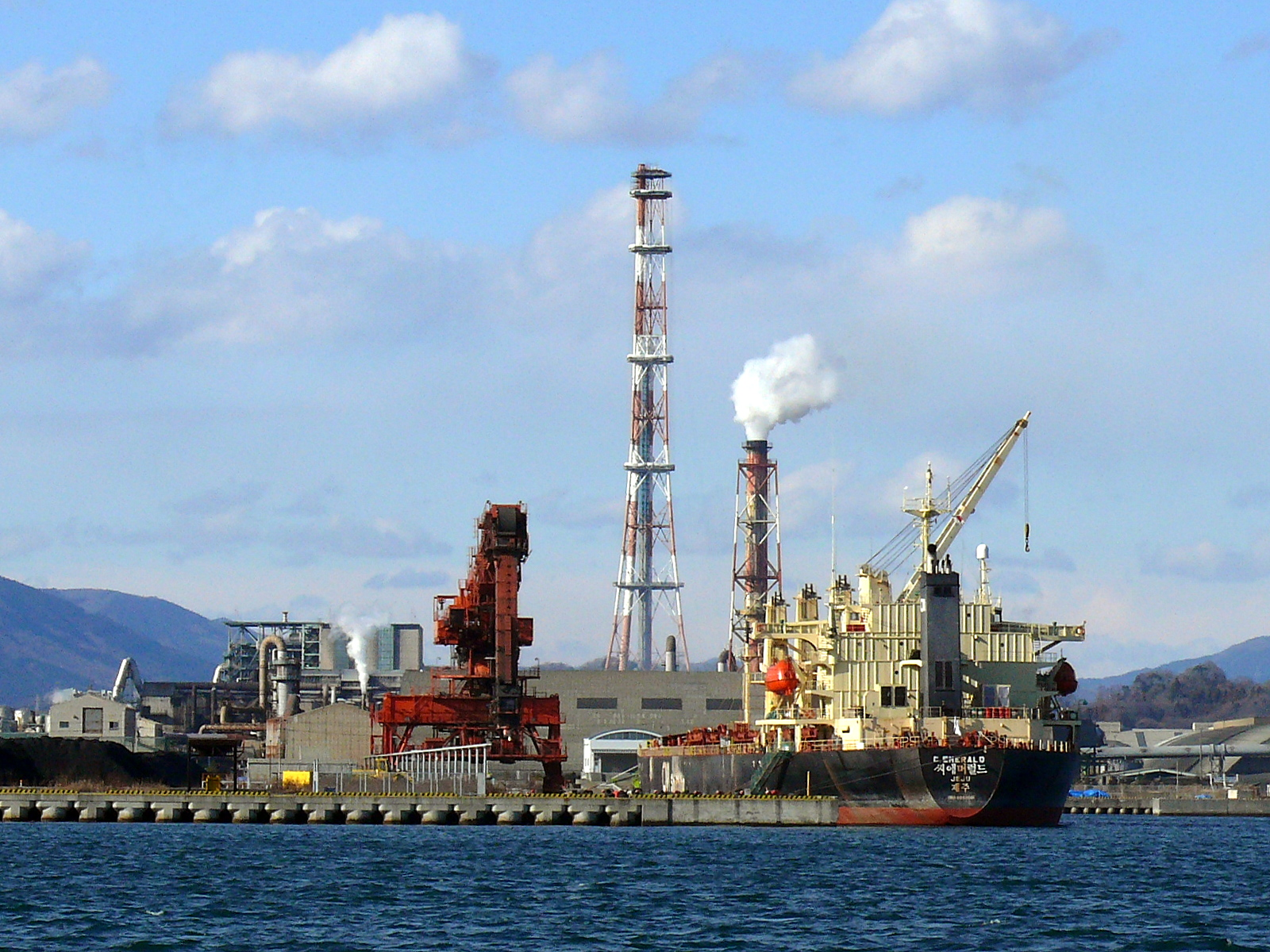
Post-World War II, Onahama developed into an industrial area, with Onahama Harbor becoming an important port for the region

Beginning during the Meiji period's rapid industrialization and continuing until the post-war rapid economic growth period, the southern section of Hamadōri and the northern part of Ibaraki Prefecture were developed by mining mogul Fusanosuke Kuhara, with operations based in Hitachi, Ibaraki. The Jōban Coalfield extended from Tomioka, Fukushima down to Hitachi, Ibaraki, with many smaller mining communities dotting the area in between.

In the midst of the post-war economic growth period, Onahama developed into an industrial area. It was during this time period that the mines of the Jōban Coalfield were closed. Following the mines' closure, multiple nuclear power plants and fossil-fuel power plants were opened, turning Hamadōri into a major electricity-generating area.

In addition to power generation, facilities making use of Hamadōri's mild weather such as the J-Village soccer training camp and Spa Resort Hawaiians contributed to the local economies.

On March 11, 2011, the Great East Japan earthquake greatly affected the area. The earthquake shook large sections of Hamadōri with an intensity of shindo 6+, the second-highest level on the scale. Furthermore, a massive tsunami hit and flooded the coast. The combination of the powerful earthquake and subsequent tsunami resulted in both large-scale loss of life and massive damage to property and infrastructure. Notably, the Fukushima Daiichi Nuclear Power Plant was heavily damaged by the tsunami, leading to the Fukushima Daiichi nuclear disaster.

== Regions ==
=== Inter-region exchange ===
Due to being sandwiched between the Pacific Ocean and the Abukuma Highlands, Hamadōri tends to be more deeply linked with other cities along the Jōban Line, namely Mito to the south and Sendai to the north, than when compared to other cities in Fukushima Prefecture, such as Fukushima (Fukushima Prefecture's capital) or Kōriyama (the prefecture's economic and transportation hub), both of which are in the prefecture's Nakadōri region. Due to this, the southern part of Hamadōri has deeper ties with Ibaraki Prefecture compared to the Tōhoku region of which it is officially a part of.

This can be observed in the regions' goods and tourism advertising, as advertising in Sōma in the north tends to emphasize Hamadōri, whereas advertising in Iwaki in the south also emphasizes the northern area of Ibaraki Prefecture. Iwaki products are also sold at Hitachi Station, which is in Ibaraki.

Also, many households in the north of Hamadōri receive local TV stations from Miyagi Prefecture, whereas many in the south receive Kantō stations.

=== Municipal governments ===
Hamadōri comprises the three displayed coastal regions. The lavender-colored area in the coastal north represents the Sōma Area Government's jurisdiction, and the Futaba Area Government's jurisdiction is directly south of the Sōma area. Together they form the Sōsō Regional Development Bureau. The green-colored region in the far coastal south is the Iwaki Regional Development Bureau.

==== Sōsō ====
The administrative area of the Sōsō Regional Development Bureau (相双地方振興局管内, Sōsō Chihō Shinkō-kyoku) had a 2010 population of 195,938 people.

- Sōma Area Government (相馬広域行政圏, Sōma Kōiki Gyōsei-ken)
  - Sōma
  - Minamisōma
    - Sōma District
    - Shinchi - Iitate
- Futaba Area Government (双葉広域行政圏, Futaba Kōiki Gyōsei-ken)
  - Futaba
    - Hirono - Naraha - Tomioka - Kawauchi - Ōkuma - Futaba - Namie - Katsurao

==== Iwaki ====
The administrative area of the Iwaki Regional Development Bureau (いわき地方振興局管内, Iwaki Chihō Shinkō-kyoku) had a 2010 population of 342,198 people.

- Iwaki (core city)

== Power plants ==
=== Nuclear power plants ===
- Fukushima Daiichi Nuclear Power Plant (Ōkuma/Futaba)
- Fukushima Daini Nuclear Power Plant (Tomioka/Naraha)

=== Fossil-fuel power plants ===
- Hara Thermal Power Plant
- Hirono Power Station
- Nakoso Power Plant
- Shinchi Power Plant

== Transportation ==
=== Rail ===
- Ban'etsu East Line
- Jōban Line

=== Expressways ===
- Ban-etsu Expressway
- Jōban Expressway

=== National roads ===
- National Route 6
- National Route 49 (Taira - Kōriyama - Aizuwakamatsu - Niigata)
- National Route 289 (Nakoso - Tanagura - Shirakawa - Tajima - Tadami)
- National Route 288 (Futaba - Kōriyama)
- National Route 459 (Namie - Nihonmatsu - Kitakata - Tsugawa)
- National Route 114 (Namie - Kawamata - Fukushima)
- National Route 115 (Sōma - Fukushima - Inawashiro)
- National Route 113 (Sōma - Shiroishi - Nan'yō)

== Media ==
=== Newspapers ===
- Iwaki Minpo

=== FM radio stations ===
- Sea Wave FM Iwaki

== See also ==
- Aizu
- Futabasaurus
- Hula Girls
- Iwaki clan
- Iwaki Province (718)
- Iwaki Province (1868)
- Iwakidaira Domain
- Jōban Coalfield
- Nakadōri
- Sōma clan
- Sōma Domain
- Sōma-nomaoi
