= Japan National Route 114 =

Road in Fukushima Prefecture, Japan

National Route 114
- 国道114号
- Japan National Route 114 highlighted in red

Route information
- Length: 69.0 km (42.9 mi)
- Existed: 1953–present

Major junctions
- West end: National Route 4 in Fukushima, Fukushima
- National Route 349; National Route 399; Jōban Expressway
- East end: National Route 6 in Namie, Fukushima

Location
- Country: Japan

Highway system
- National highways of Japan; Expressways of Japan
← National Route 113	→ National Route 115

National Route 114 (国道114号, Kokudō Hyaku jūyongō) is a national highway of Japan that traverses the prefecture of Fukushima in a northwest–southeast routing. It connects the prefecture's capital city, Fukushima in north-central Fukushima Prefecture to the town of Namie on the prefecture's eastern coast. It has a total length of 69.0 kilometers (42.9 mi). A section of the highway was closed following the Fukushima nuclear accident, but it has since been reopened.

== Route description ==
National Route 114 begins at a junction with National Route 4 and National Route 115 in the Fukushima Prefecture's capital city, Fukushima in the north-central part of the prefecture. Heading east through the town of Kawamata, the route crosses over the Abukuma Highlands that divide the prefecture's central Nakadōri and eastern Hamadōri regions. Crossing into the town of Namie, the highway meets National Route 399 and shares a brief concurrency with it before National Route 399 departs to the south at junction with National Route 459. National Route 459 joins National Route 114 as a concurrent route towards central Namie. Just west of central Namie the highway meets the Jōban Expressway at Namie Interchange. In the central district of Namie, the two concurrent highways end at a junction with National Route 6. National Route 114 has a total length of 69.0 kilometers (42.9 mi).

== History ==
National Route 114 was established by the Cabinet of Japan on 18 May 1954 as Secondary National Route 114 between the city of Fukushima and the town of Namie. The highway was reclassified as General National Route 114 on 1 April 1965. A straightening and widening project, called the Kotsunagi Bypass, began along the highway in the mountains of Kawamata in 2006. After nine years of construction, the project was completed on 28 June 2015.

=== Closure within the nuclear exclusion zone ===
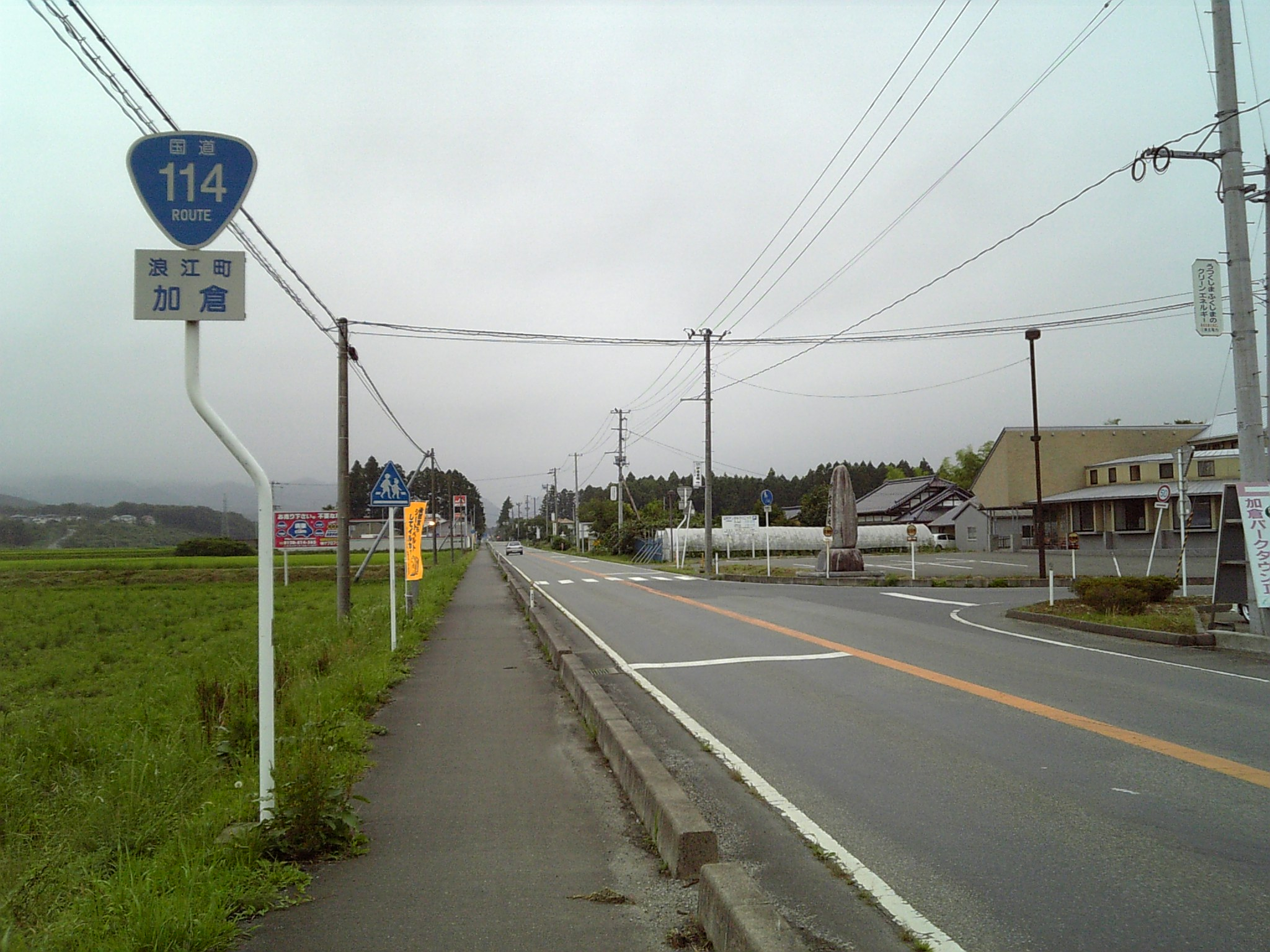
National Route 114 in Namie.

A section of the highway was closed between its eastern terminus and the Shimotsushima neighborhood of Namie following the Fukushima nuclear accident and the subsequent establishment of the 20 kilometer exclusion zone on 22 April 2011. On 6 December 2014, the highway was reopened to vehicular traffic east of the Jōban Expressway in order to allow traffic from the new section of expressway to be linked to National Route 6 and the rest of the expressway further south. From then until 2017, a 27-kilometer-long (17 mi) section of highway remained closed within the exclusion zone. The interchange with the Jōban Expressway was expanded on 1 March 2015 to allow access to the expressway's newly-built section between Namie and Tomioka. National Route 114 was fully reopened to vehicular traffic on 20 September 2017, though some restrictions are still in place in terms of where the highway can be exited.

== Major junctions ==
The route lies entirely within Fukushima Prefecture.

Location	km	mi	Destinations	Notes
Fukushima	0.0	0.0	National Route 4 / National Route 115 (Kitamachi Bypass) – Kōriyama, Sendai	Western terminus
Fukushima	1.2	0.75	Fukushima Prefecture Route 309 – to National Route 115, Okabe	
Fukushima	1.4	0.87	Fukushima Prefecture Route 308 – Yamaguchi	
Fukushima	8.0	5.0	Fukushima Prefecture Route 306 south – Iino	
Fukushima	11.0	6.8	Fukushima Prefecture Route 40 south – Iino	
Kawamata	15.0	9.3	Fukushima Prefecture Route 269 north – Date	
Kawamata	16.2	10.1	Fukushima Prefecture Route 39 west – to Tōhoku Expressway, Nihonmatsu	
Kawamata	19.0	11.8	Fukushima Prefecture Route 117 west – Nihonmatsu, Kawamata Gymnasium	
Kawamata	20.3	12.6	National Route 349 – Iitate, Minamisōma, Date, Tamura	
Kawamata	29.0	18.0	Fukushima Prefecture Route 62 west – Nihonmatsu	Western end of Fukushima Prefecture Route 62 concurrency
Kawamata	30.7	19.1	Fukushima Prefecture Route 62 west – Minamisōma	Eastern end of Fukushima Prefecture Route 62 concurrency
Namie	39.4	24.5	National Route 399 north – Iitate	Western end of National Route 399 concurrency
Namie	40.3	25.0	National Route 399 south / National Route 459 west – Nihonmatsu, Miyakoji	Eastern end of National Route 399 concurrency, western end of National Route 459 concurrency
Namie	53.1	33.0	Fukushima Prefecture Route 49 north – Minamisōma	
Namie	54.7	34.0	Fukushima Prefecture Route 50 west – Katsurao, Tamura	
Namie	62.1	38.6	Fukushima Prefecture Route 34 north – Minamisōma	
Namie	62.8	39.0	Fukushima Prefecture Route 35 south – Futaba	
Namie	63.9	39.7	Jōban Expressway – Mito, Sōma, Tokyo, Sendai	Namie Interchange (E6 exit 21)
Namie	65.4	40.6	Fukushima Prefecture Route 257 north – Sōma, Odaka	
Namie	68.1	42.3	Fukushima Prefecture Route 120 north – Minamisōma; Fukushima Prefecture Route 253 south – Central Namie	
Namie	69.0	42.9	National Route 6 – Sendai, Tokyo; Fukushima Prefecture Route 254 east – Ukedo	Eastern terminus of National Routes 114 and 459; roadway continues east as Fukushima Prefecture Route 254
1.000 mi = 1.609 km; 1.000 km = 0.621 mi: Concurrency terminus
