= Iwaki Province =

Iwaki Province may refer to:

- Iwaki Province (718) (岩城国), an old province of Japan established in 718 and dissolved by 724
- Iwaki Province (1868) (磐城国), an old province of Japan established in 1868
