= Namie, Fukushima =

Namie 浪江町
- Town
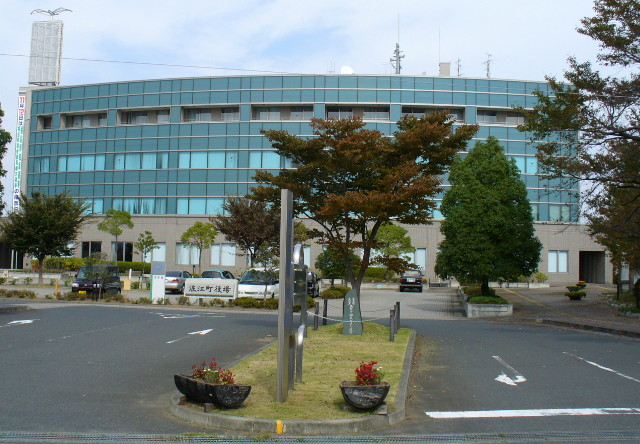
- Namie Town Hall

- Flag Seal

- Location of Namie in Fukushima Prefecture

- Coordinates: 37°29′40.5″N 141°00′2.6″E
- Country: Japan
- Region: Tōhoku
- Prefecture: Fukushima
- District: Futaba

Area
  - Total: 223.14 km^{2} (86.15 sq mi)

Population (February 29, 2020)
  - Total: 1,238
  - Density: 5.548/km^{2} (14.37/sq mi)
- Time zone: UTC+9 (Japan Standard Time)
- Phone number: 0243-62-0123
- Address: Kiyohashi Rokutanda 7-2, Namie-machi, Futaba-gun, Fukushima-ken 979-1592
- Climate: Cfa
- Website: Official website
- Symbols
- Bird: Common gull
- Flower: Cosmos
- Tree: Pine

Namie (浪江町, Namie-machi) is a town located in Fukushima Prefecture, Japan. As of 29 February 2020 the town has a population of 1,238 in 794 households, although the official registered population was 17,114 in 6853 households. The total area of the town is 223.14 square kilometres (86.15 sq mi).

The town was evacuated as a result of the Fukushima Daiichi nuclear disaster—being directly downwind from the power plant—and was within the exclusion zone set up in response to the disaster. Following ongoing clean-up efforts, Namie's business district and town hall have reopened, but access to more heavily contaminated western parts of the town remains restricted as decontamination continues to be carried out.

== Geography ==
Namie is located on the Pacific Ocean coastline of central Fukushima.

=== Surrounding municipalities ===
- Fukushima Prefecture
  - Futaba
  - Iitate
  - Katsurao
  - Kawamata
  - Minamisōma
  - Nihonmatsu
  - Ōkuma
  - Tamura

=== Climate ===
Namie has a humid subtropical climate (Köppen climate classification Cfa). The average annual temperature in Namie is 12.7 °C (54.9 °F). The average annual rainfall is 1,539.7 mm (60.62 in) with September as the wettest month. The temperatures are highest on average in August, at around 24.0 °C (75.2 °F), and lowest in January, at around 2.2 °C (36.0 °F).

Climate data for Namie (1991−2020 normals, extremes 1976−present)
Month	Jan	Feb	Mar	Apr	May	Jun	Jul	Aug	Sep	Oct	Nov	Dec	Year
Record high °C (°F)	18.6 (65.5)	22.2 (72.0)	25.9 (78.6)	32.0 (89.6)	33.5 (92.3)	35.7 (96.3)	36.9 (98.4)	37.9 (100.2)	36.2 (97.2)	31.6 (88.9)	25.8 (78.4)	21.6 (70.9)	37.9 (100.2)
Mean daily maximum °C (°F)	7.4 (45.3)	8.0 (46.4)	11.1 (52.0)	16.2 (61.2)	20.9 (69.6)	23.3 (73.9)	26.9 (80.4)	28.5 (83.3)	25.2 (77.4)	20.3 (68.5)	15.4 (59.7)	10.1 (50.2)	17.8 (64.0)
Daily mean °C (°F)	2.2 (36.0)	2.7 (36.9)	5.7 (42.3)	10.7 (51.3)	15.5 (59.9)	18.8 (65.8)	22.6 (72.7)	24.0 (75.2)	20.6 (69.1)	15.1 (59.2)	9.7 (49.5)	4.7 (40.5)	12.7 (54.9)
Mean daily minimum °C (°F)	−3.0 (26.6)	−2.7 (27.1)	0.1 (32.2)	5.0 (41.0)	9.9 (49.8)	14.6 (58.3)	19.1 (66.4)	20.3 (68.5)	16.5 (61.7)	10.0 (50.0)	3.7 (38.7)	−0.7 (30.7)	7.7 (45.9)
Record low °C (°F)	−11.9 (10.6)	−12.4 (9.7)	−8.0 (17.6)	−4.7 (23.5)	−1.1 (30.0)	4.6 (40.3)	9.9 (49.8)	10.2 (50.4)	5.5 (41.9)	−1.6 (29.1)	−5.6 (21.9)	−11.2 (11.8)	−12.4 (9.7)
Average precipitation mm (inches)	59.0 (2.32)	45.6 (1.80)	94.5 (3.72)	119.6 (4.71)	125.8 (4.95)	156.3 (6.15)	193.4 (7.61)	163.4 (6.43)	238.2 (9.38)	225.9 (8.89)	71.1 (2.80)	44.2 (1.74)	1,539.7 (60.62)
Average precipitation days (≥ 1.0 mm)	4.7	5.0	7.9	9.2	10.0	12.8	14.3	11.0	12.8	9.6	6.3	5.0	108.6
Mean monthly sunshine hours	170.5	171.7	183.0	186.6	194.3	145.8	136.7	164.6	126.8	137.3	152.6	159.1	1,926.1
Source: Japan Meteorological Agency

== Demographics ==
Per Japanese census data, the population of Namie was relatively constant over the past 40 years until the nuclear disaster.

Historical population
Year	Pop.	±%
1960	25,234	—
1970	21,375	−15.3%
1980	22,601	+5.7%
1990	23,515	+4.0%
2000	22,609	−3.9%
2010	20,905	−7.5%
2020	1,238	−94.1%

== History ==
The area of present-day Namie was part of Mutsu Province. The remains of Kofun period burial mounds have been found in the area. During the Nara period, it was the center of ancient Futaba District within Iwaki Province During the Edo period, it was part of Sōma Domain, which was ruled by the Sōma clan until the Meiji restoration. On April 1, 1889, the village of Namie was created within Naraha District, Fukushima with the establishment of the modern municipalities system. Naraha District became Futaba District in April 1896. Namie was raised to town status on March 1, 1900. The town expanded on May 1, 1956 by annexing the neighboring villages of Obori, Karino and Tsushima.

=== 2011 Tōhoku earthquake and tsunami ===
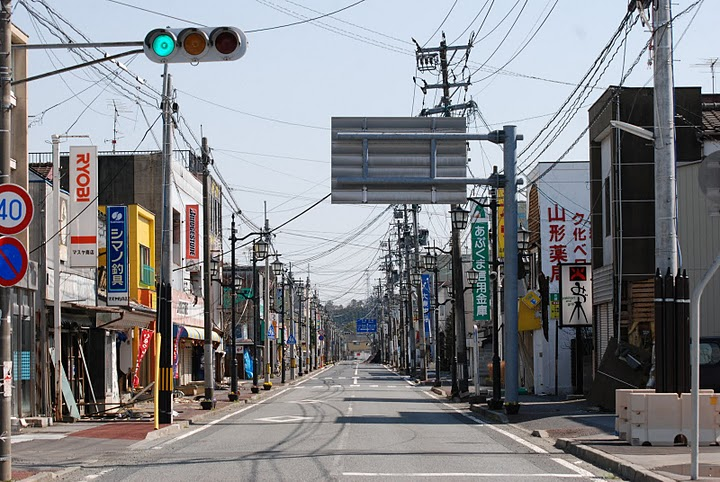
The center of Namie on April 12, 2011, showing damage to buildings sustained during the earthquake a month prior

Namie was severely affected by the Fukushima Daiichi nuclear disaster, and the Tōhoku earthquake and tsunami on March 11, 2011. Besides sustaining considerable damage from the earthquake, and the tsunami (which devastated the coastal area), the entire population of the town was evacuated en masse on the morning of March 12 as it is located well within the 20-kilometre (12 mi) exclusion radius around the damaged Fukushima Daiichi nuclear power plant. It was not searched for bodies until more than one month after the tsunami.

During the evacuation, many town residents took refuge at a community center in western Namie in the belief that seasonal winds would blow radiation from the plant in a different direction. However, a change in wind direction blew the plant's plume directly at them, heavily contaminating that part of the town. It was revealed months later that the national and prefectural governments had known about the direction of the plume due to forecasts by the System for Prediction of Environment Emergency Dose Information (SPEEDI) computer system, but had decided not to tell evacuees in order to prevent a panic. Tamotsu Baba, Namie's mayor at the time, said the decision to withhold information from his town was akin to "murder."

On 15 April 2012, the town of Namie asked the Japanese government for free health-care for its residents. To monitor the long-term health, the city would provide to all inhabitants health handbooks in order to keep a thorough record of all health checks and thyroid examinations. These handbooks were similar to ones used to monitor the health of the survivors of the Atomic bombings of Hiroshima and Nagasaki. These "hibakusha" health books were free from medical fees, and Namie asked the government to set up a similar program for the people in Namie. Of the seven other cities around the nuclear plant, Futaba town was also willing to take part in this program.

In April 2012, the government of the evacuated town of Namie purchased a whole-body dosimeter. The device was installed in a temporary housing in Nihonmatsu, Fukushima, in order to monitor the internal radiation exposure and the health of the citizens of Namie. Some 50 people a day could be examined, a complete screening would take two minutes per person. Initial screenings of the whole population was planned to be finished at the end of the fiscal year 2012. In this way the town government wanted to offer a long-term monitoring program to the population. Another reason for this was the excessive exposure to radiation during the first days directly after the nuclear disaster in March 2011, when predictions from SPEEDI were ignored by the Fukushima Prefectural government.

On April 1, 2013, the nuclear evacuation zone in Namie was revised. Japanese authorities set three different zones according to different levels of radiation: in the first, people were free to go in and out, but not allowed to stay overnight; in the second, access was limited to short visits; and in the third area, all entry was forbidden because of elevated radiation levels that were not expected to go down within five years after the accident.

On October 27, 2016, a brand new shopping mall, Machi Nami Marche, was opened in the town, with the intention that it would aid the return of people to the area in the event that the evacuation orders were lifted. This construction project was completed around the same time as a similar project in the nearby town of Tomioka, also within the evacuation zone.

On April 1, 2017, restrictions were lifted on the first and second zones, allowing residents to return to those areas, although a poll indicated over half did not intend to do so. The areas are in the coastal portion of Namie, which holds the town centre. The majority of the town's hinterland remains in zone 3, with access completely prohibited due to high residual radiation. On December 22, 2017, the area was listed by the national government as one of several special zones for reconstruction and revitalisation, alongside several neighbouring towns and cities in the vicinity.

Further decontamination work began in May 2018 as part of a plan to decontaminate 660 hectares by March 2023. This is 3.7% of the area where entry is prohibited.

On October 3, 2020, it was announced that Ukedo Elementary School, one of the town's six elementary schools, was to be preserved as a museum and memorial to the events of the earthquake and tsunami. Though the building was in the direct path of the surging waters, prompt action by the school's faculty ensured that there were no casualties, with all 96 students and staff inside the school at the time of the disaster successfully escaping to higher ground.

=== 2016 earthquake ===
A 6.9 magnitude earthquake struck off the coast of Namie in the early morning hours of November 22, 2016. A tsunami warning was issued indicating waves of up to three meters.

== Economy ==
The economy of Namie was dependent on commercial fishing, agriculture and food processing.

On 7 March 2020, the Fukushima Hydrogen Energy Research Field (FH2R), a 10MW-class hydrogen production unit, was inaugurated in Namie. The site occupies 180,000 square meters of land, much of which is occupied by a solar array; but power from the grid is also used to conduct electrolysis of water to produce hydrogen fuel.

== Education ==
Namie had six public elementary schools and three public junior high schools operated by the town government, and two public high schools operated by the Fukushima Prefectural Board of Education. All schools were closed after the nuclear disaster. As of 2019, six pupils were enrolled at a new elementary school.

== Transportation ==
=== Railway ===
East Japan Railway Company (JR East) -Jōban Line

- Namie

=== Highway ===
- Jōban Expressway - Namie Interchange
- National Route 6
- National Route 114
- National Route 259
- National Route 399

== Local attractions ==
- Sōma ware ceramics

== Sister cities ==
- Xinghua, Jiangsu, People's Republic of China,
- Dipolog, Philippines
- Dapitan, Philippines
- Polanco, Zamboanga del Norte, Philippines
- Lancaster, California, United States
