= Katsurao, Fukushima =

Katsurao 葛尾村
- Village
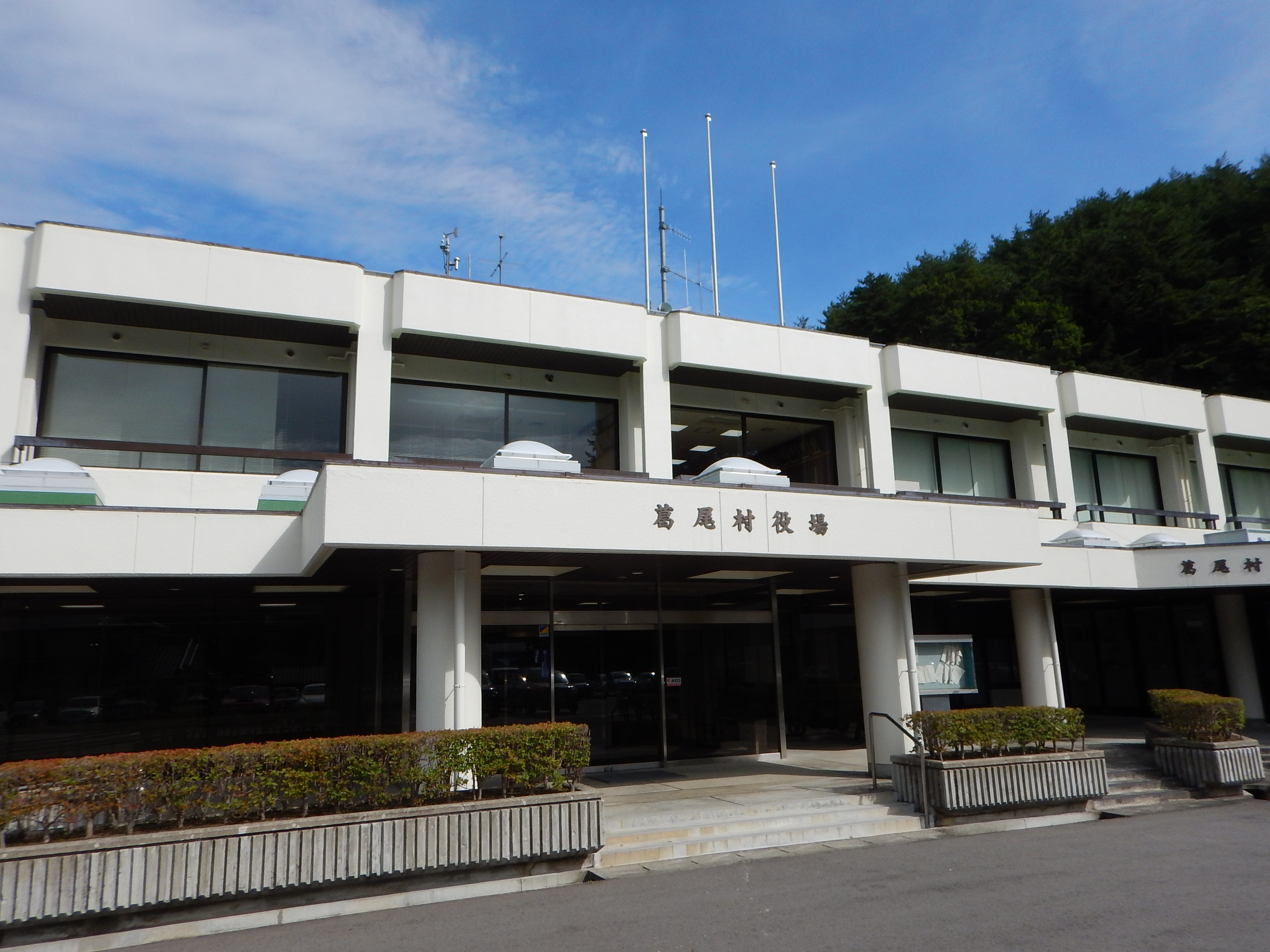
- Katsurao village hall

- Flag Seal

- Location of Katsurao in Fukushima Prefecture

- Coordinates: 37°30′12.7″N 140°45′51.5″E
- Country: Japan
- Region: Tōhoku
- Prefecture: Fukushima
- District: Futaba

Area
  - Total: 84.37 km^{2} (32.58 sq mi)

Population (April 1, 2020)
  - Total: 1,387
  - Density: 16.44/km^{2} (42.58/sq mi)
- Time zone: UTC+9 (Japan Standard Time)
- City symbols
  - Tree: Pinus densiflora
  - Flower: Azalea
  - Bird: Green pheasant
- Phone number: 0247-61-2850
- Address: Ochiai 16, Katsurao-mura, Futaba-gun, Fukushima-ken 979-1602
- Website: Official website

Katsurao (葛尾村, Katsurao-mura) is a village located in Fukushima Prefecture, Japan. As of 1 April 2020, the village had an official registered population of 1,387 in 475 households, and a population density of 16 inhabitants per square kilometre (41/sq mi). The total area of the village is 84.37 square kilometres (32.58 sq mi). However, in March 2011, the entire population was evacuated as a result of the Fukushima Daiichi nuclear disaster. The evacuation order was lifted on June 12, 2016 for much of the village; however, the actual number of residents who returned is considerably less than the official population numbers.

== Geography ==
Katsurao is located in the Abukuma Plateau of central Fukushima in the Tōhoku region of northern Japan, with a mean altitude of over 500 metres (1,600 ft).

=== Surrounding municipalities ===
- Fukushima Prefecture
  - Namie
  - Nihonmatsu
  - Tamura

== Demographics ==
Per Japanese census data, the population of Katsurao was relatively constant over the past 40 years until the nuclear disaster.

Historical population
Year	Pop.	±%
1920	1,625	—
1930	2,278	+40.2%
1940	1,875	−17.7%
1950	2,816	+50.2%
1960	3,041	+8.0%
1970	2,397	−21.2%
1980	1,992	−16.9%
1990	1,866	−6.3%
2000	1,736	−7.0%
2010	1,531	−11.8%
2020	420	−72.6%

== Climate ==
Katsurao has a humid subtropical climate (Köppen climate classification Cfa). The average annual temperature in Katsurao is 10.4 °C (50.7 °F). The average annual rainfall is 1,374 mm (54.1 in) with September as the wettest month. The temperatures are highest on average in August, at around 23 °C (73 °F), and lowest in January, at around −0.7 °C (30.7 °F).

== History ==
The area of present-day Katsurao was part of Mutsu Province. The remains of Kofun period burial mounds have been found in the area. During the Nara period, it was part of ancient Futaba District in Iwaki Province. During the Edo period, it was part of Sōma Domain, ruled by the Sōma clan until the Meiji restoration. After the Meiji restoration, on April 1, 1889, the village of Katsurao was created within Futaba District, Fukushima with the establishment of the modern municipalities system on April 1, 1889.

=== 2011 Fukushima Daiichi nuclear disaster ===
Although Katsurao escaped significant damage from the 2011 Tōhoku earthquake and tsunami, it was located downwind of the Fukushima Daiichi Nuclear Power Plant. Although outside the nominal 20-kilometre (12 mi) exclusion zone, as a result of wind patterns following the Fukushima Daiichi nuclear disaster, the entire population of the village was evacuated by government order by May 2011. In March 2013, the government divided the village into three zones, with the majority of the village area cleared for unrestricted return of its inhabitants by spring of 2014, a smaller area cleared for daylight return only, and a larger area in which the existing restrictions against entry would be maintained until at least 2017. However, in March 2014, the government postponed lifting of the restrictions on return for a year due to remaining high levels of radiation. On June 12, 2016, the evacuation order was lifted for approximately two-thirds of the village area, with the mountainous region bordering neighbouring Namie remaining restricted due to high residual radiation.

== Economy ==
The economy of Katsurao was formerly heavily dependent on agriculture.

== Education ==
Katsurao had one public elementary school and one public junior high school operated by the village government in March 2011. The elementary school remains closed. The village did not have a public high school.

== Transportation ==
=== Railway ===
- Katsurao is not served by any passenger train stations.

=== Highway ===
- National Route 399
