= Ōkuma, Fukushima =

Ōkuma 大熊町
- Town
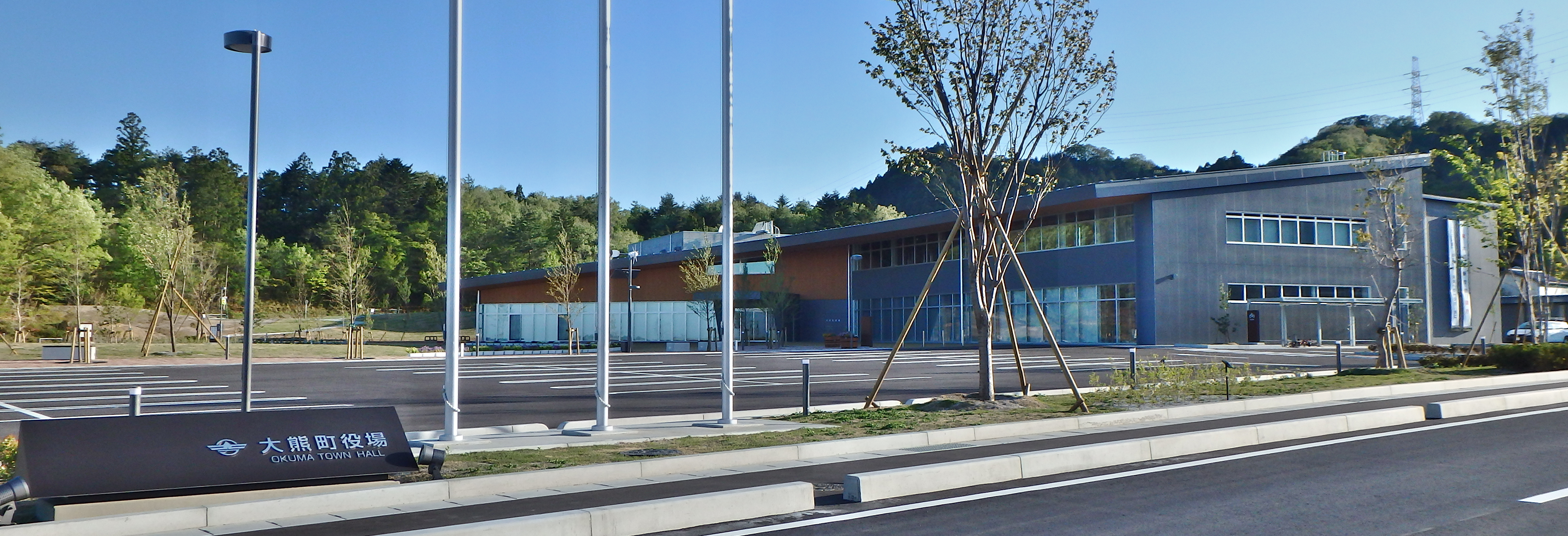
- Ōkuma Town Hall

- Flag Emblem

- Location of Ōkuma in Fukushima Prefecture

- Coordinates: 37°22′55″N 140°57′30″E
- Country: Japan
- Region: Tōhoku
- Prefecture: Fukushima
- District: Futaba

Area
  - Total: 78.71 km^{2} (30.39 sq mi)

Population (1 May 2023)
  - Total: 10,004
  - Density: 127.1/km^{2} (329.2/sq mi)
- Time zone: UTC+09:00 (Japan Standard Time)
  - Tree: Momi fir
  - Flower: Nashi pear
  - Bird: Black kite
- Phone number: 0120-26-3844
- Address: Shimonogami Ōno 634, Ōkuma-machi, Futaba-gun, Fukushima-ken 979–1308
- Website: Official website

Ōkuma (大熊町, Ōkuma-machi) is a town located in Fukushima Prefecture, Japan. In 2010, the town had a population of 11,515. However, the town was totally evacuated in the aftermath of the Fukushima Daiichi nuclear disaster and residents were permitted return during daylight hours from May 2013. In April 2019, parts of the town were deemed to have been successfully decontaminated, with residents allowed to return to these areas.

As of 1 May 2023, the town had an official registered population of 10,004 in 4,852 households; however, this number is substantially higher than the actual number of residents in the town due to the municipality continuing to keep track of its residents despite them having evacuated to settlements elsewhere throughout the country. The actual resident population in the town was 545 people in May 2023.

== Geography ==
Ōkuma is located on the Pacific Ocean coastline of central Fukushima. Ōkuma lies in the center of the Hamadōri region of Fukushima, bordered to the west by the Abukuma Highlands and to the east by the Pacific Ocean. It is set between the cities of Namie and Futaba to the north, Tamura to the west, and Kawauchi and Tomioka to the south. The town is the site of the Fukushima Daiichi Nuclear Power Plant.

Mt. Higakure (日隠山, Higakure-yama), with a height of 601.5 metres (1,973 ft), is within the town. The Kuma River (熊川, Kuma-gawa) also flows within the town.

=== Surrounding municipalities ===
- Fukushima Prefecture
  - Futaba
  - Kawauchi
  - Namie
  - Tamura
  - Tomioka

== Demographics ==
Per Japanese census data, the population of Ōkuma grew steadily over the past 40 years until the nuclear disaster.

Historical population
Year	Pop.	±%
1920	5,790	—
1930	6,401	+10.6%
1940	6,044	−5.6%
1950	8,760	+44.9%
1960	8,206	−6.3%
1970	7,750	−5.6%
1980	9,396	+21.2%
1990	10,304	+9.7%
2000	10,803	+4.8%
2010	11,515	+6.6%
2018	10,402	−9.7%
2020	10,265	−1.3%
2023	10,004	−2.5%

== Climate ==
Ōkuma has a humid subtropical climate (Köppen climate classification Cfa). The average annual temperature in Ōkuma is 12.1 °C (53.8 °F). The average annual rainfall is 1,329 mm (52.3 in) with September as the wettest month. The temperatures are highest on average in August, at around 24.1 °C (75.4 °F), and lowest in January, at around 1.5 °C (34.7 °F).

== History ==
=== Early history of the area ===
The area of present-day Ōkuma was part of Mutsu Province. While historical records are unclear, it is believed that the area of present-day Ōkuma was ruled by the Shineha clan beginning in the mid-12th century. Later, during the Sengoku period, in December 1492 the Sōma clan defeated the Shineha clan, and the area transferred to the Sōma clan's control.

During the Edo period, the Kumagawa Post Town (熊川宿, Kumagawa-juku) was established along the Iwaki-Sōma Road (岩城相馬街道), also referred as Coastal Road (浜通り Hamadōri), in the area of present-day Ōkuma. The Iwaki-Sōma Road connected the region to Mito in the south and Sendai in the north. Modern-day National Route 6, which runs through Ōkuma, generally follows the same route as the Iwaki-Sōma Road.

=== Creation of the municipality ===
In 1888, the national government passed the Municipal Government Act (市制町村制, Shi-sei Chōson-sei), and in accordance with the act, on 1 April of the following year the villages of Ōno (大野村, Ōno-mura) and Kumamachi (熊町村, Kumamachi-mura) were inaugurated as parts of the district of Shineha (標葉郡, Shineha-gun).

On 1 April 1896, the Shineha district merged with the district of Naraha (楢葉郡, Naraha-gun) to become the present-day district of Futaba. Over a half a century later, on 11 November 1954, the villages of Ōno and Kumamachi merged to form the present-day town of Ōkuma.

=== From coal mining to nuclear power ===
Beginning during the 1870s, coal mining became an integral part of the economy of the Hamadōri region. This continued through the beginning stages of Japan's post-World War II rapid economic growth period, leading Fukushima Prefecture to lag behind the country as a whole in industrial and economic development. In the tail end of the 1950s, the prefecture began promoting electricity generation as a way to alleviate the economic problems on the horizon from the impending closure of the coal mines.

On 30 September – 22 October 1961 the town councils of Futaba and Ōkuma, respectively, unanimously voted to invite Tokyo Electric Power Company to build a nuclear power plant on the border of the two towns. In September 1967 construction began on unit one of the Fukushima Daiichi Nuclear Power Plant. By October 1978, units one through four, which are on the Ōkuma side of the plant, had been commissioned. Units five and six (on the Futaba side) were commissioned by March 1979.

=== 2011 Tōhoku earthquake, tsunami, and nuclear disaster ===
On 11 March 2011 the 2011 Tōhoku earthquake and tsunami occurred, causing severe damage to Ōkuma and especially devastating coastal areas. The tsunami hit and flooded the Fukushima Daiichi Nuclear Power Plant, located on the Pacific coast of Ōkuma, and set off the Fukushima Daiichi nuclear disaster. By the following morning, the Japanese government had ordered residents to evacuate to outside of a 10 km (6.2 mi) radius of the power plant. Many residents were evacuated to the nearby city of Tamura, among other cities.

Shortly thereafter Ōkuma set up a temporary town office in the Tamura City General Gymnasium (田村市総合体育館, Tamura-shi Sōgō Taiikukan). The temporary town office was later moved on 3 April to Aizuwakamatsu. Ōkuma residents had scattered to about 20 evacuation centers located in the cities of Tamura and Kōriyama and the towns of Miharu and Ono, and by 30 April approximately 1,800 residents had expressed the desire to also move to Aizuwakamatsu.

On 10 December 2012 Ōkuma modified the areas of the town under evacuation orders and permitted residents of select regions of the town to return to their homes. Within the first 19 days 104 residents returned, however other residents of Ōkuma, like some other communities in Fukushima, are "starting to come to terms with a sobering realization: their old homes are probably lost forever, and they must start anew elsewhere."

In 2015, the town sought to develop a forested area for living by 2018. The seaside area of the town, which was once heavily populated, was intended to be turned into a nature reserve.

In April 2019, parts of Ōkuma were deemed safe from further radiation contamination. The BBC reported that around 50 people were scheduled to move back.

== Education ==
Ōkuma has three public elementary schools and one public junior high school operated by the town government, and one public high school operated by the Fukushima Prefectural Board of Education. The operation of all schools remains suspended indefinitely.

== Transportation ==
=== Railway ===
- JR East – Jōban Line
  - Ōno

=== Highway ===
- Jōban Expressway – Ōkuma Interchange
- National Route 6
- National Route 288

== International relations ==
- Bathurst, New South Wales, Australia, since March 1991
