= Iwaki-kuni =

Iwaki-kuni may refer to two former provinces of Japan centered on the coast of today's Fukushima Prefecture:

- Iwaki Province (718) (岩城国), an old province of Japan established in 718 and dissolved by 724
- Iwaki Province (1868) (磐城国), an old province of Japan established in 1868
