= Ōborisōma ware =

Type of Japanese pottery

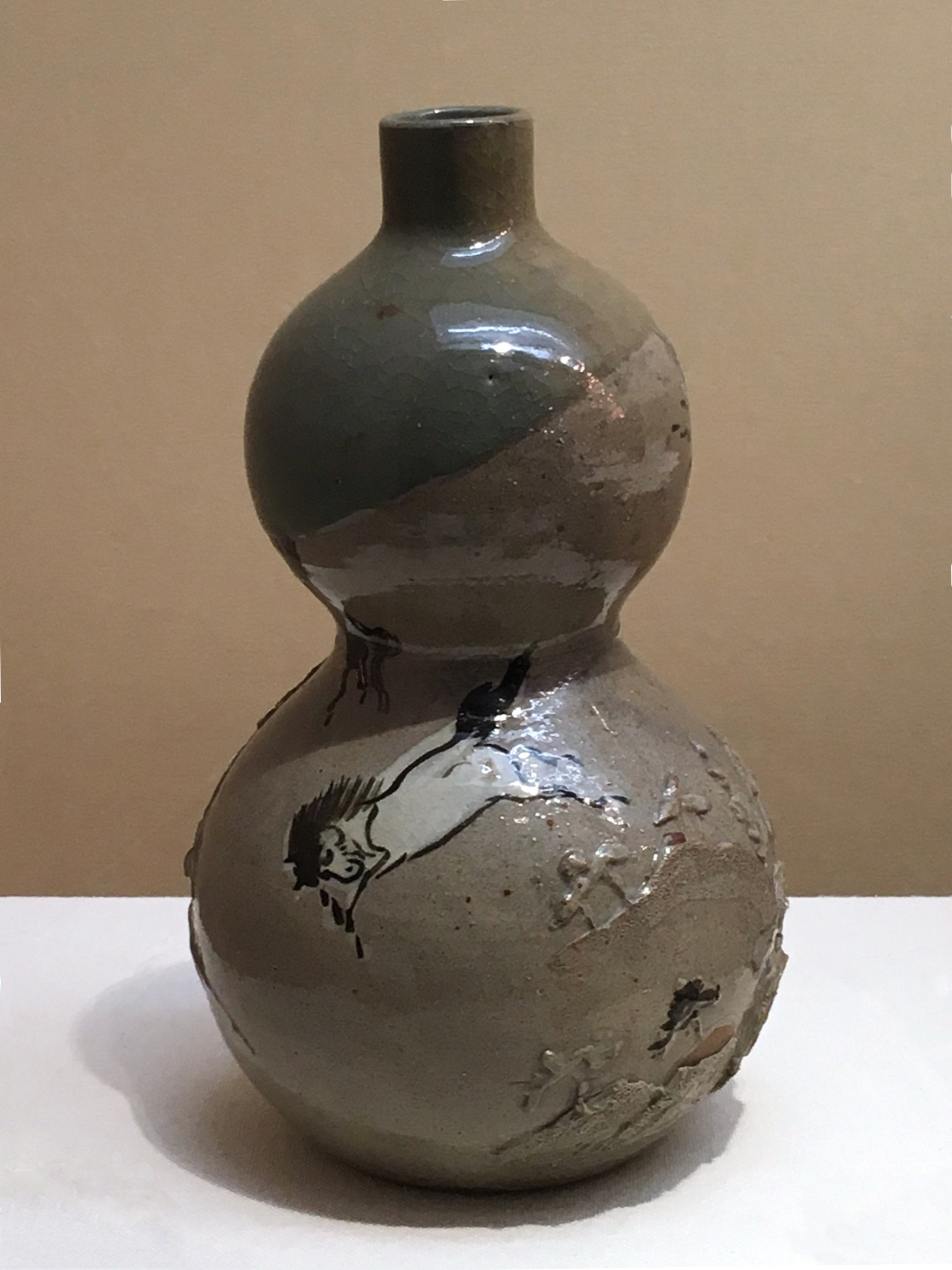
Sōma ware gourd-shaped bottle, horse design. Edo period, 18–19th century.

Ōborisōma ware (大堀相馬焼), also known as Ōbori ware (大堀焼) or Sōma ware (相馬焼) is a form of Japanese pottery traditionally from the Hamadōri area of Fukushima Prefecture, in the Tōhoku region of Japan.

== History ==
The production of Ōborisōma ware began during the Genroku era (1688–1704) when suitable clays were found in what is now the town of Namie, Fukushima, which was used to make everyday utility items. Although the pottery came to the attention of the daimyō of Sōma Nakamura Domain, who encouraged production and lent the Sōma clan crest to choice examples, the pottery remained largely for common usage, and by the end of the Edo period there were over 100 kilns in the area. However, production rapidly declined after the Meiji restoration with the industrialisation of Japan and the increasing prevalence of mass produced pottery for everyday use. Production was only revived after the end of World War II and in 1978, Ōborisōma ware was designated as one of the national objects of traditional craftsmanship.

The Fukushima Daiichi nuclear disaster in March 2011 severely affected this industry, as the village, located only 10 km away from the nuclear powerplants, was heavily polluted by radioactive material, and all craftsmen had to leave their workshops. A new workshop opened at Nihonmatsu, Fukushima; however, the traditional sources of clay and ceramic glaze are within the Fukushima exclusion zone and are now inaccessible.

== Characteristics ==
It is characterized by its green color and blue cracks on the surface. Much of it is multi-layered.

Because the ma in sōma means "horse", calligraphic horses are painted on many pieces, often as a stylized horse painted in metallic gold.

A very rare character of Sōma ware is its multi-layered structure.

The dual layering of the pottery insulates the hot liquids to keep them hot and keeps the outside cool, so one doesn't burn one's hands.

== See also ==
- Japanese pottery and porcelain
- List of Traditional Crafts of Japan
