= Sōma Nakamura Castle =

Sōma Nakamura Castle 相馬中村城
- Sōma, Fukushima Prefecture, Japan
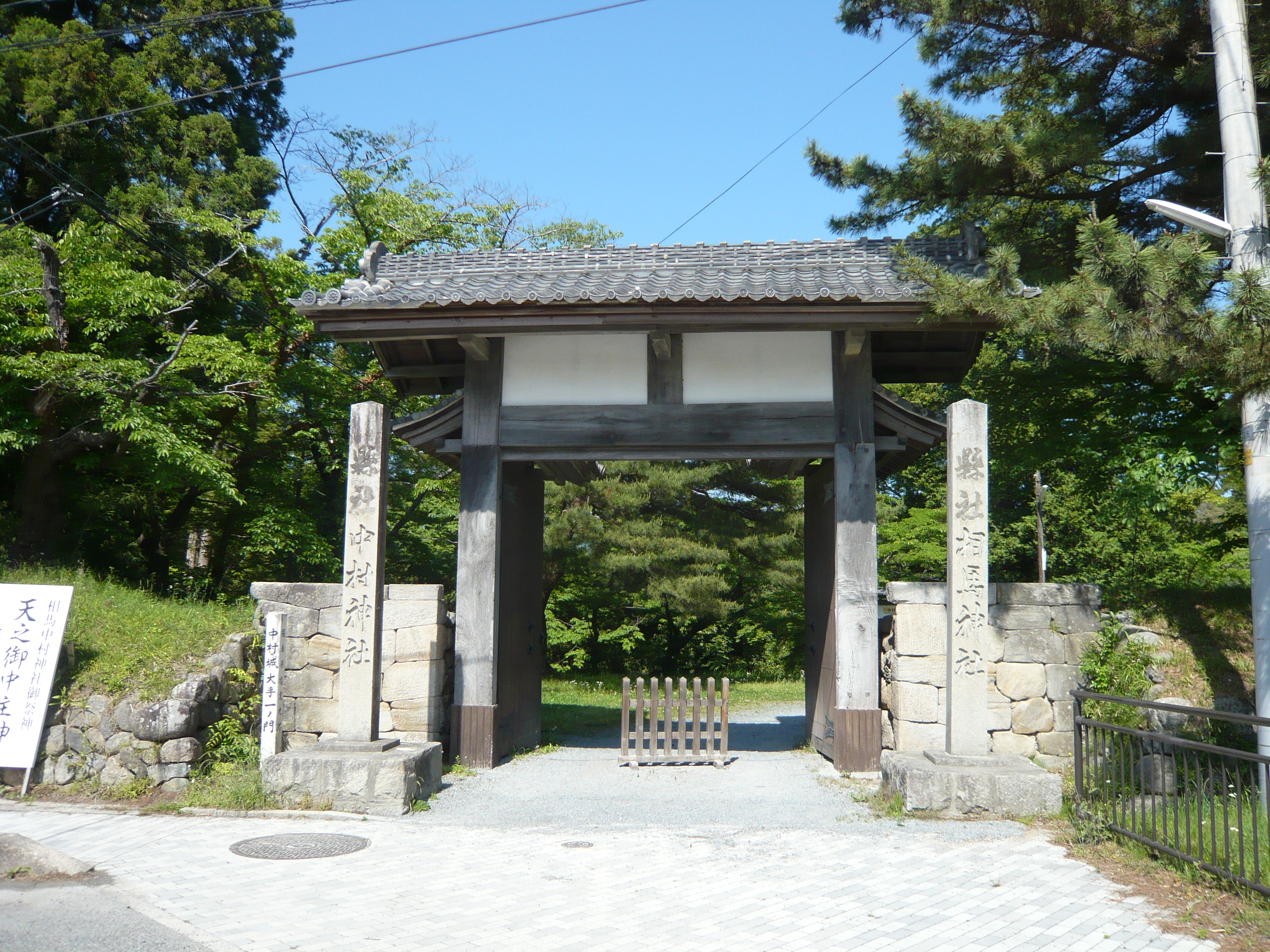
- Ōte-ichimon main gate

Site information
- Type: Hirayama-style Japanese castle
- Open to the public: yes
- Condition: ruins

Location
- Nakamura Castle Sōma Nakamura Castle 相馬中村城 (Japan)
- Coordinates: 37°47′53″N 140°54′52″E

Site history
- Built: 1611
- Built by: Sōma Toshitane
- In use: Edo period
- Demolished: 1871

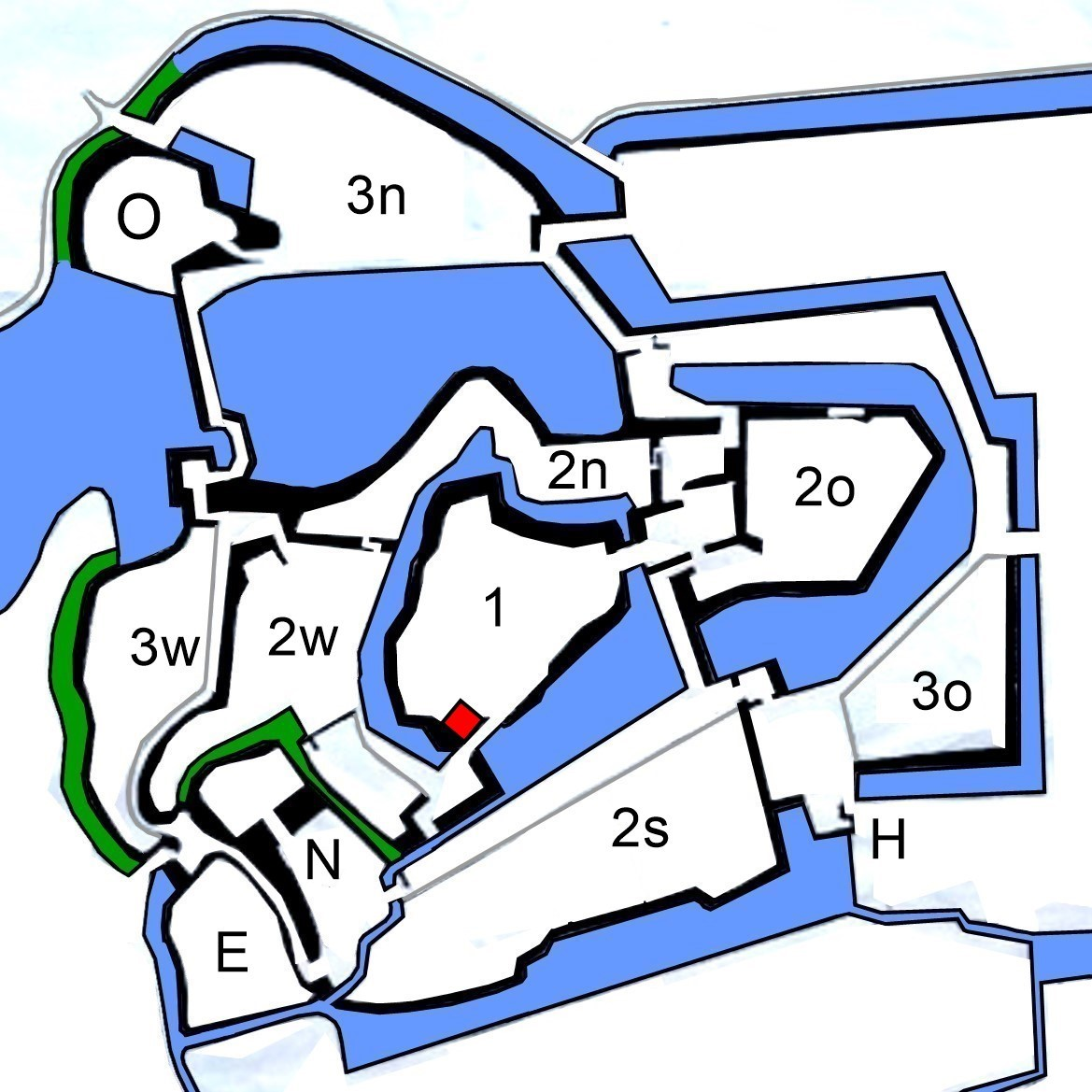
Layout of Sōma Nakamura Castle

Sōma Nakamura Castle (相馬中村城, Sōma Nakamura-jō) was a Japanese castle that formed the administrative center of Sōma Domain, a feudal domain of the Sōma clan under the Tokugawa shogunate, located in what is now the city of Sōma in northern Fukushima Prefecture, Japan. The castle was also called "Nakamura Castle" or "Mutsu-Nakamura Castle". The castle's contemporary nickname was Baryū Castle (馬陵 城) from a place name mentioned in the Chinese Spring and Autumn Annals.

== History ==
Sōma Morotsune (1139-1205), the progenitor of the Sōma clan, was a retainer of Minamoto-no-Yoritomo and was awarded with the district of Namekata in southern Mutsu Province for his services against the Northern Fujiwara at Hiraizumi. His sixth generation descendant, Sōma Shigetane (相 馬 重 胤), built a fortified house at Odaka (小 高) in 1326, which was later expanded into a castle.

In 1611, Sōma Toshitane (相 馬 利 胤, 1581-1625) the daimyō of Sōma Domain, decided to abandon Odaka and build a new castle nearby in Nakamura, where an ancient castle built by Sakanoue no Tamuramaro had once stood. His descendants remained at the castle until the end of the Edo period.

== Layout ==
The Inner bailey (本 丸) of the castle was built on a hill that rises above the local plain between the Koizumi and Udagawa rivers. In the southwest corner of the Inner bailey was a three-story donjon (天 守, marked in red on the map), which was lost in 1670 by a lightning strike. It was never rebuilt. The inner bailey was surrounded by the Second Bailey (二 ノ 丸), which was divided into northern, eastern, southern and western sections, respectively. The Third Bailey formed a ring around the Second Bailey and was also divided into four sections. In the southeast was a separate area once containing the residence of the daimyō (marked "N" on the map), which is now occupied by the Nakamura Jinja, a Shinto shrine dedicated to the Sōma clan ancestors. This was protected by an outer enclosure (marked "E" on the map) called the Enzō-kuruwa (円 蔵 曲 輪).

The defences of the castle were the strongest to the north, where the moats could be cut to flood a large area, turning it into an impassable swamp. This was because the Sōma clan viewed the main threat to the castle as being from the Date clan to the north. However, Sōma Nakamura Castle never saw battle, and was surrendered to the forces of the Satchō Alliance during the Boshin War with no resistance.

After the Meiji Restoration, the new Meiji government ordered the destruction of all former feudal fortifications, and in compliance with this directive, all structures of Sōma Nakamura Castle were pulled down and demolished in 1871, leaving only the inner Ōte-ichimon main gate (marked "H" on the map). The site is now a public park, and nothing remains of the former castle aside from a monument and part of the moats to the north and east.

== Literature ==
- Schmorleitz, Morton S. (1974). Castles in Japan. Tokyo: Charles E. Tuttle Co. pp. 144–145. ISBN 0-8048-1102-4.
- Motoo, Hinago (1986). Japanese Castles. Tokyo: Kodansha. p. 200 pages. ISBN 0-87011-766-1.
- Mitchelhill, Jennifer (2004). Castles of the Samurai: Power and Beauty. Tokyo: Kodansha. p. 112 pages. ISBN 4-7700-2954-3.
- Turnbull, Stephen (2003). Japanese Castles 1540-1640. Osprey Publishing. p. 64 pages. ISBN 1-84176-429-9.
