= Sōma Yoshitane =

Sōma Yoshitane may refer to:

- Sōma Yoshitane (1558-1635) (相馬義胤), a Sengoku period daimyō and 16th hereditary head of the Sōma clan
- Sōma Yoshitane (1619–1651) (相馬義胤), an early Edo-period tozama daimyō of Sōma Nakamura Domain and 18th hereditary head of the Sōma clan
- Sōma Yoshitane (1765–1813) (相馬祥胤), a mid-Edo-period fudai daimyō of Sōma Nakamura Domain and 25th hereditary head of the Sōma clan
