= Sōma Nakamura Domain =

Sōma Nakamura Domain 相馬中村藩
- under Tokugawa shogunate Japan
- 1602–1871
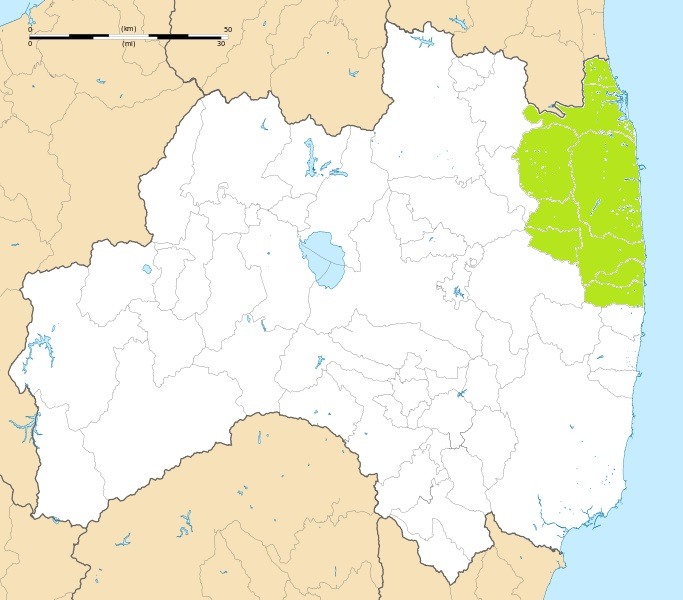
- Map of Sōma Nakamura Domain holdings in the late Edo period.
- Capital: Sōma Nakamura Castle
- Area
  - Coordinates: 37°47′53″N 140°54′52″E
  - Type: Daimyō
- Historical era: Edo period
  - Established: 1602
  - Disestablished: 1871
- Today part of: part of Fukushima Prefecture

The Sōma Nakamura Domain (相馬中村藩, Sōma Nakamura han) was a minor feudal domain under the Tokugawa shogunate of Edo period Japan based in southern Mutsu Province in what is now part of the Hamadōri region of modern-day Fukushima Prefecture. It was ruled for the entirety of its history by the Sōma clan. It was centered at Sōma Nakamura Castle in what is now part of the city of Sōma. The domain was also known as Sōma Domain (相馬藩, Sōma-han) or Nakamura Domain (中村藩, Nakamura-han).

== History ==
During early Kamakura period, the Sōma clan served as retainers of Minamoto no Yoritomo and were awarded lands in southern Mutsu Province for their role in the conquest of Hiraizumi in 1189. Thus, along with the Nanbu clan and Shimazu clan, they had the distinction of being one of the few clans which held onto their territories for over 700 years, from the Kamakura period through the Meiji Restoration.

During the late Sengoku period, the Sōma were allied with the powerful Satake clan based at Mito and fought many battles against the Date clan to the north. The 16th hereditary chieftain of the Sōma clan, Sōma Yoshitane was defeated by Date Masamune in 1589. However, after he pledged fealty to Toyotomi Hideyoshi, his domain was re-established. During the Battle of Sekigahara, he did not respond to Tokugawa Ieyasu, as the Satake clan had decided to side with the pro-Toyotomi western army under Ishida Mitsunari. As a result, his domain was again seized, this time by the victorious Ieyasu. A couple of months later, largely through the mediation and compassion of Honda Masanobu and Date Masamune, the clan was pardoned and allowed to return to its former lands, with Yoshitane's son, Sōma Toshitane becoming first daimyō of the 60,000-koku Sōma Nakamura Domain in 1602.

Sōma Nakamura Castle was rebuilt in 1611 to be the seat of the domain. In 1712, the Sōma managed to change their status from tozama to fudai daimyō. The Great Tenmei famine of 1781–1789 hit the domain very hard and the domain subsequently accepted landless immigrants from the Etchū Province (present-day Toyama Prefecture) to keep the population. During the last Edo period, the domain began to implement the Hōtoku agricultural reforms originated by Ninomiya Sontoku.

In the Boshin War of the Meiji Restoration, the domain joined the pro-Tokugawa Ōuetsu Reppan Dōmei. As forces of the Satchō Alliance advanced into Nakadori, Nakamura Castle fell with little resistance. was captured by the Meiji government troops. With the abolition of the han system in 1871, the lands of the domain became Nakamura Prefecture, which subsequently was merged into Fukushima Prefecture.

== Holdings at the end of the Edo period ==
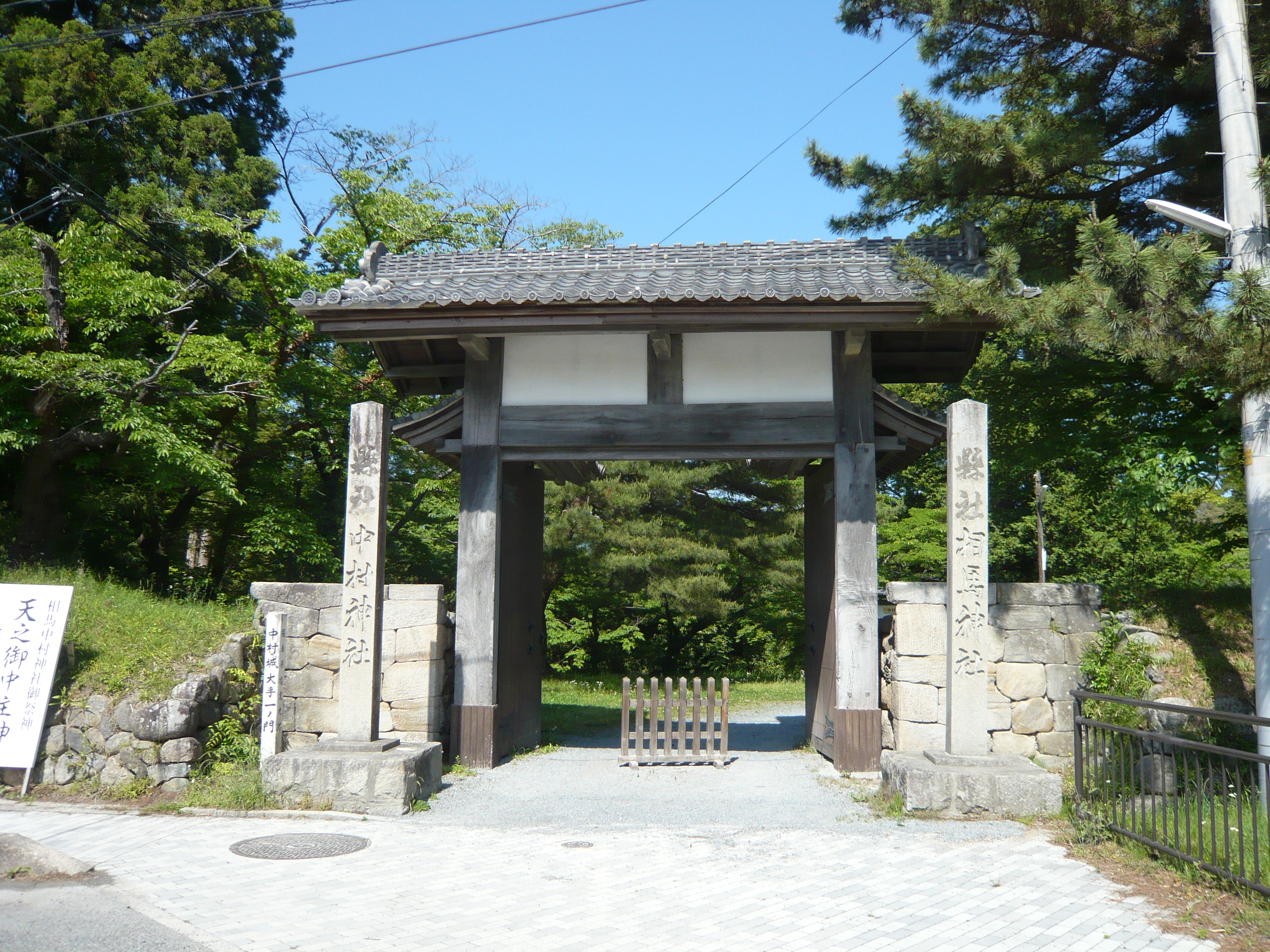
Gate of Sōma Nakamura Castle

Unlike most domains in the han system which consisted of several discontinuous territories calculated to provide the assigned kokudaka, based on periodic cadastral surveys and projected agricultural yields., Sōma Nakamura Domain consisted of a single unified territory covering what is now the modern municipalities of Sōma, Minamisōma, Futaba, Namie, Ōkuma and Iitate as well as most of Shinchi in what is now Fukushima Prefecture.

- Mutsu Province (Iwaki)
  - 124 villages in Namekata District
  - 55 villages in Shimeha District
  - 41 villages in Uda District

== List of daimyōs ==
- Sōma clan, 1602–1871 (tozama; fudai from 1712)

#	Name	Tenure	Courtesy title	Court Rank	kokudaka
1	Sōma Toshitane (相馬利胤)	1602–1625	Daizen-no-suke (大膳亮)	Junior 5th Rank, Lower Grade (従五位下)	60,000 koku
2	Sōma Yoshitane (相馬義胤)	1625–1651	Daizen-no-suke (大膳亮)	Junior 5th Rank, Lower Grade (従五位下)	60,000 koku
3	Sōma Tadatane (相馬忠胤)	1651–1673	Nagato-no-kami (長門守)	Junior 5th Rank, Lower Grade (従五位下)	60,000 koku
4	Sōma Sadatane (相馬貞胤)	1673–1679	Dewa-no-kami (出羽守)	Junior 5th Rank, Lower Grade (従五位下)	60,000 koku
5	Sōma Masatane (相馬昌胤)	1679–1701	Danjō-shōhitsu (弾正少弼)	Junior 5th Rank, Lower Grade (従五位下)	60,000 koku
6	Sōma Nobutane (相馬叙胤)	1701–1709	Nagato-no-kami (長門守)	Junior 5th Rank, Lower Grade (従五位下)	60,000 koku
7	Sōma Takatane (相馬尊胤)	1709–1765	Danjō-shōhitsu (弾正少弼)	Junior 5th Rank, Lower Grade (従五位下)	60,000 koku
8	Sōma Morotane (相馬恕胤)	1765–1783	Nagato-no-kami (長門守)	Junior 5th Rank, Lower Grade (従五位下)	60,000 koku
9	Sōma Yoshitane (相馬祥胤)	1783–1801	Danjō-shōhitsu (弾正少弼)	Junior 5th Rank, Lower Grade (従五位下)	60,000 koku
10	Sōma Muratane (相馬樹胤)	1801–1813	Buzen-no-kami (豊前守)	Junior 5th Rank, Lower Grade (従五位下)	50,000 koku
11	Sōma Masutane (相馬益胤)	1813–1835	Nagato-no-kami (長門守)	Junior 5th Rank, Lower Grade (従五位下)	50,000 koku
12	Sōma Michitane (相馬充胤)	1835–1865	Daizen-no-kami (大膳大夫)	Junior 4th Rank, Lower Grade (従四位下)	60,000 koku
13	Sōma Tomotane (相馬誠胤)	1865–1871	Inaba-no-kami (因幡守)	Junior 5th Rank, Lower Grade (従五位下)	60,000 koku

=== Sōma Toshitane ===
Sōma Toshitane (相馬利胤, 1581 – 11 October 1625) was the 1st daimyō of Sōma-Nakamura Domain and the 17th hereditary chieftain of the Sōma clan. He was the eldest son of Sōma Yoshitane, the 16th Sōma chieftain. His courtesy title was Daizen-no-suke and Court rank was Junior Fifth Rank, Lower Grade. During the Battle of Sekigahara, he attempted to remain neutral, as his father was on close terms with Ishida Mitsunari and as he had concerns with regards to his powerful neighbors, the Satake clan. However, the forces of Tokugawa Ieyasu won the battle, and with the establishment of the Tokugawa shogunate, the clan faced the loss of their hereditary domains. The shogunate relocated the Satake to Akita Domain and despite a considerable loss of kokudaka, the Satake offered to set aside a portion of their new territories for the Sōma clan. However, Sōma Toshitane (at that time named Sōma Mitsutane) decided to petition the shogunate for reinstatement instead, and changed the kanji of his name from 三胤 to蜜胤 to remove the character in his name that he had shared with Ishida Mitsunari. A number of senior Tokugawa retainers spoke out on his behalf, including Honda Masanobu, and the Sōma clan's traditional rival, Date Masamune. The shogunate agreed to his petition, and the Sōma clan were allowed to keep their lands.

In 1602, Toshitane remarried to an adopted daughter of shōgun Tokugawa Hidetada, further cementing his position. He changed his name to Toshitane shortly thereafter. In 1611 he relocated the domain seat to Nakamura Castle. During the 1615 Battle of Osaka, he served in the van of Hidetada's army. On his return after the war, he laid out a castle town around Nakamura Castle modeled after the grid-pattern of Kyoto and sponsored the development of Sōma ware ceramics as a local product. He died in 1625 at the age of 45, and his grave is in what is now the city of Minamisōma, Fukushima, at the temple of Dokei-ji.

=== Sōma Yoshitane (1619–1651) ===
Sōma Yoshitane (相馬義胤, 1619 – 24 April 1651) was the 2nd daimyō of Sōma-Nakamura Domain and the 18th hereditary chieftain of the Sōma clan. He was the eldest son of Sōma Toshitane, and his mother was an adopted daughter of Shogun Tokugawa Hidetada. His courtesy title was Nagato-no-kami but was changed to Daizen-no-suke in 1636. His wife was a daughter of Naito Tadashige of Toba Domain. He became daimyō at the age of 7 in 1625 on the death of his father, and due to his youth, his uncle Sōma Yoshitane served as regent. In 1641, during a great fire in Edo, he was ordered by the shogunate to oversee firefighting efforts, but was seriously injured when a horse panicked. He died of illness in 1651 without a male heir.

=== Sōma Tadatane ===
Sōma Tadatane (相馬忠胤, 1637 – 9 December 1673) was the 3rd daimyō of Sōma-Nakamura Domain and the 19th hereditary chieftain of the Sōma clan. He was the younger son of Tsuchiya Toshinao of Kururi Domain and was adopted into the domain through the intervention of the rōjū Matsudaira Nobutsuna when Yoshitane died without heir. His courtesy title was Nagato-no-kami. In 1656 he conducted a comprehensive re-survey of the domain, accompanied by land reform and tax reduction and in 1668 undertook large scale development of new rice lands. He is regarded as one of the most able of the Sōma rulers and had good relations with officials in the shogunate administration. He died of illness at Nakamura Castle in 1673.

=== Sōma Sadatane ===
Sōma Sadatane (相馬貞胤, 28 June 1659 – 25 December 1679) was the 4th daimyō of Sōma-Nakamura Domain and the 20th hereditary chieftain of the Sōma clan. He was the eldest son of Sōma Tadatane. His wife was a daughter of Itakura Shigenori. He became daimyō in 1673 on the death of his father, and received the courtesy title of Dewa-no-kami. He died six years later in 1679 without and heir, and the domain passed to his younger brother Masatane.

=== Sōma Masatane ===
Sōma Masatane (相馬 昌胤, 1 August 1661 – 7 November 1728) was the 5th daimyō of Sōma-Nakamura Domain and the 21st hereditary chieftain of the Sōma clan. As his older brother Sadatane had died without heir, he was posthumously appointed successor. He was received in formal audience to Shogun Tokugawa Ietsuna and received the courtesy title of Danjō-shōhitsu. From 1689 to 1690 he served as a sobayōnin to Shogun Tokugawa Tsunayoshi. He retired from public life in February 1701, living in rural seclusion to his death at the age of 68 in 1728.

=== Sōma Nobutane ===
Sōma Nobutane (相馬叙胤, 5 May 1677 – 6 June 1711) was the 6th daimyō of Sōma-Nakamura Domain and the 22nd hereditary chieftain of the Sōma clan. He was the second son of Satake Yoshizumi of Kubota Domain and his mother was the daughter of Matsudaira Naomasa of Matsue Domain. He married the daughter of Sōma Masatane when he was adopted as heir. He was presented in formal audience to Shogun Tokugawa Tsunayoshi as the son of Satake Yoshizumi in December 1692, and was adopted into the Sōma clan in July 1696. After a second audience with Shogun Tokugawa Tsunayoshi in December 1696, he was granted the courtesy title of Zushō-no-kami. He became daimyō in February 1701 on his Masatane's retirement. In 1708, his courtesy title was changed to Nagato-no-kami. He retired a year later in 1709, turning the domain over to Masatane's real son, Takatane and died in 1711 at the age of 35.

=== Sōma Takatane ===
Sōma Takatane (相馬尊胤, 10 April 1697 – 6 May 1772) was the 7th daimyō of Sōma-Nakamura Domain and the 23rd hereditary chieftain of the Sōma clan. He was the second son of Sōma Masatane by a concubine. His wife was a daughter of Honda Yasuyoshi of Zeze Domain. In 1696, the childless Masatane adopted Nobutane, a younger son from the Satake clan, as his heir, but Takatane was born the following year. In order to restore the line of succession, Takatane was adopted by Nobutane in December 1708. He was presented in formal audience to Shogun Tokugawa Tsunayoshi and became daimyō shortly afterwards on Nobutane's retirement. He was granted the courtesy title Sanuki-no-kami in 1719. He adopted Nobutane's son Tokutane has heir in December 1708. In 1728, he was reprimanded with a reduction in his courtesy title to Danjō-shōhitsu. In 1752 Tokutane died before taking office, and his son Morotane was named heir. In May 1765 Takatane retired. He died in 1772.

=== Sōma Morotane ===
Sōma Morotane (相馬祥胤, 29 November 1734 – 11 September 1791) was the 8th daimyō of Sōma-Nakamura Domain and the 24th hereditary chieftain of the Sōma clan. He was the third son of Sōma Tokutane, the son of Nobutune. His wife was a daughter of Aoyama Yoshihide of Miyazu Domain. In January 1751 named Tokutane's heir, and was presented in formal audience to shōgun Tokugawa Ieshige a month later. The following year, he was appointed Sōma Takatane's heir and was granted the courtesy title of Sanuki-no-kami. He became daimyō in May 1765 on the retirement of Sōma Takatane, and his courtesy title was changed to Inaba-no-kami in September 1775. He retired from public life in December 1783, turning his titles over to his son Yoshitane. He died in Nakamura in 1791 at the age of 57.

=== Sōma Yoshitane (1765–1813) ===
Sōma Yoshitane (相馬祥胤, 20 July 1765 – 14 July 1813) was the 9th daimyō of Sōma-Nakamura Domain and the 25th hereditary chieftain of the Sōma clan. He was the third son of Sōma Morotane. Although he was born in 1765, when he was appointed heir to the domain in 1774, the clan reported his birth year to have been 1761, so that he would not be considered to be underage. His eldest brother had died in infancy, and his second eldest brother was sickly, and not considered a suitable heir. He was presented in formal audience to shōgun Tokugawa Ieharu in June 1775 and granted the courtesy title of Sanuki-no-kami. He became daimyō in 1783 on the retirement of his father, and his courtesy title was changed to Inaba-no-kami. The following year, the Great Tenmei famine struck the domain, which was forced to borrow 5000 ryō from the shogunate; however, most of this money was misappropriated by corrupt officials and many people in the domain starved. The domain was unable to repay the loan as agreed, and Yoshitane was ordered to step down in favor of his son Muratane. He was also reprimanded by a reduction in courtesy title to Danjō-shōhitsu. He died in 1816.

=== Sōma Muratane ===
Sōma Muratane (相馬樹胤, 4 January 1782 – 13 October 1839) was the 10th daimyō of Sōma-Nakamura Domain and the 26th hereditary chieftain of the Sōma clan. He was the eldest son of Sōma Yoshitane, and his mother was a daughter of Matsudaira (Sakurai) Tadatsugu of Amagasaki Domain. He was presented in formal audience to shōgun Tokugawa Ienari in November 1798 and granted the courtesy title of Sanuki-no-kami. He became daimyō in 1801 on the death of his father, and his courtesy title was changed to Inaba-no-kami. He retired from public life in November 1813. As his only son had died in childhood, he turned his titles over to his younger brother, Sōma Masutane. He died in 1839.

=== Sōma Masutane ===
Sōma Masutane (相馬 益胤, 18 February 1796 – 15 July 1845) was the 11th daimyō of Sōma-Nakamura Domain and the 27th hereditary chieftain of the Sōma clan. He was the fourth son of Sōma Yoshitane. His wife was a daughter of Matsudaira Yoriyoshi of Moriyama Domain. In September 1813, he was formally adopted by his elder brother Muratane as heir. He was presented in formal audience to Shogun Tokugawa Ienari in October 1813 and became daimyō one month later. His courtesy title was Nagato-no-kami. From 1817, he took steps to reform the domain's finances, and he retired in March 1835 in favor of his eldest son, Michitane. He died in 1845.

=== Sōma Michitane ===
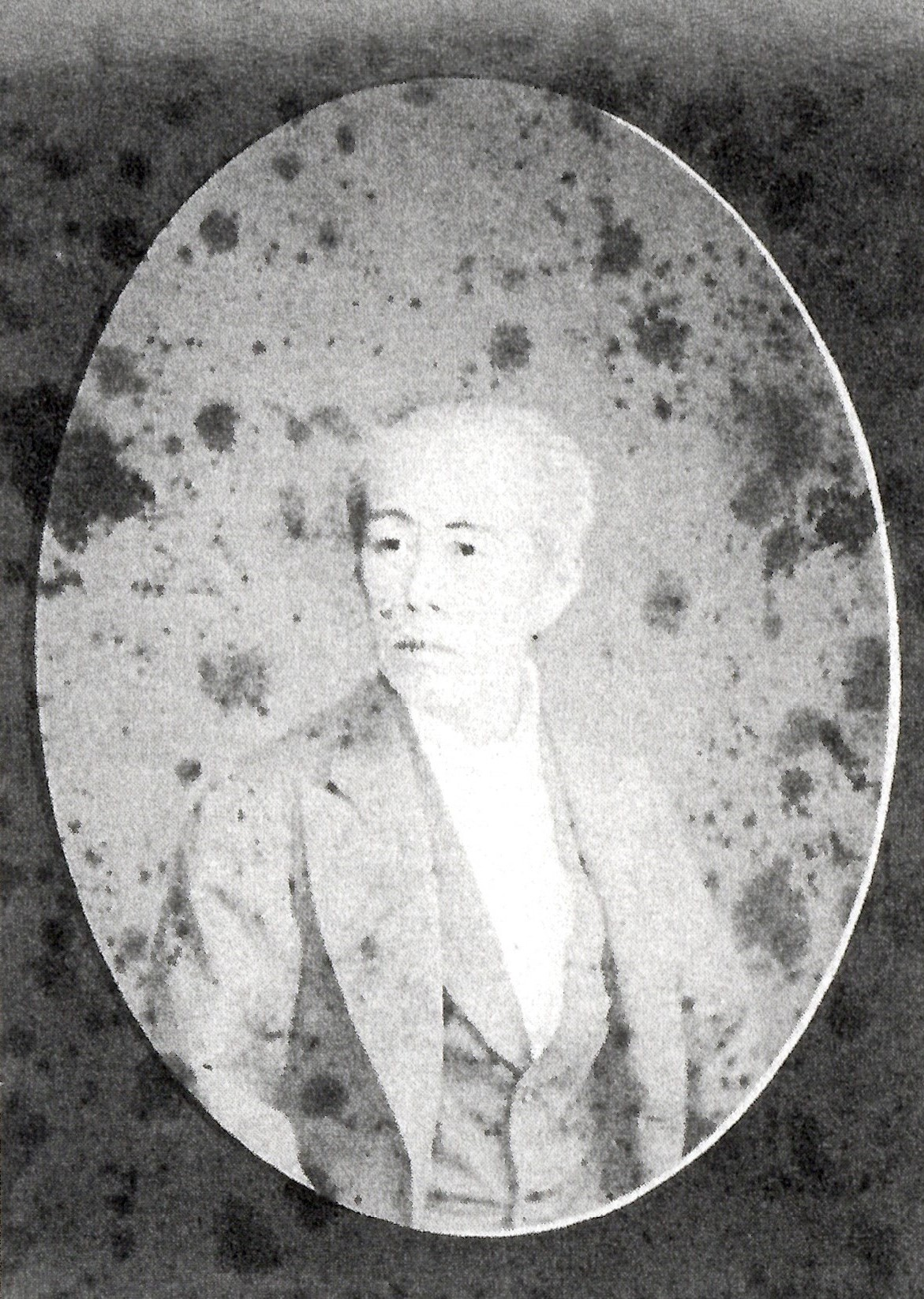
Sōma Michitane

Sōma Michitane (相馬 充胤, 13 April 1819 – 19 February 1887) was the 12th daimyō of Sōma-Nakamura Domain and the 28th hereditary chieftain of the Sōma clan. He was the eldest son of Sōma Masutane. His wife was a daughter of Yanagisawa Yasuhiro of Yamato-Kōriyama Domain. In February 1833, he was presented in formal audience to shōgun Tokugawa Ienari and subsequently received the courtesy title of Daizen-no-suke. He became daimyō on the retirement of his father in March 1835. He took steps to reform the domain by introducing the theories of Ninomiya Sontoku. In May 1864, he was advised to Junior Fourth Rank, Lower Grade and Daizen Daifu. He retired from public life in April 1865. He surrendered the domain to Imperial forces during the Boshin War of the Meiji Restoration, and was received in audience by Emperor Meiji in May, 1870. He was advanced to Third Rank on his death in 1922.

=== Sōma Tomotane ===
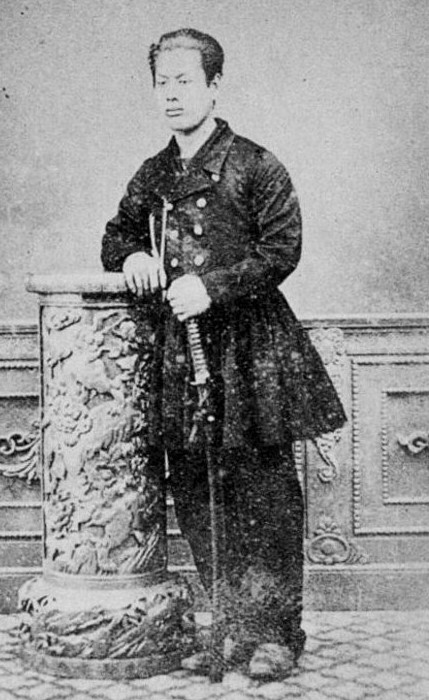
Sōma Tomotane

Sōma Tomotane (相馬誠胤, 18 September 1852 – 22 February 1892) was the 13th and final daimyō of Sōma-Nakamura Domain and the 29th hereditary chieftain of the Sōma clan. He was the younger brother of Sōma Michitane. He had the courtesy title of "Inaba-no-kami" under the Tokugawa shogunate, and his court rank was elevated the Fourth Rank with the kazoku peerage title of viscount under the Meiji government. His wife was the daughter of Toda Mitsuhisa of Matsumoto Domain. Toshitane was the second son of Sōma Masutane, and was appointed heir to Michitane in 1858. He was presented in formal audience to shōgun Tokugawa Ieshige in March 1865, and became daimyō when his brother retired a few months later. During the Bakumatsu period, he initially attempted to remain neutral in the Boshin War, as the domain had negligible military forces. However, after the defeat of the Tokugawa forces at the Battle of Toba–Fushimi in February 1868, he was pressured by his more powerful neighbors (including Iwakitaira Domain and Sendai Domain into joining the Ōuetsu Reppan Dōmei. The Satchō Alliance forced advanced through the Hamadōri region and captured Sōma Nakamura Castle with only token resistance a few months later. Under the new Meiji government, he was appointed Domain governor in June 1868, and was advanced to Fifth Court Rank. In 1871, with the abolition of the han system, he was relieved of his post.

On 14 April 1879, Tomotane was placed under house arrest by the government, after family members filed a petition accusing him of mental instability. On 10 December 1885, one of his former retainers, Nishigori Takekiyo, filed a lawsuit accusing these relatives, led by Toshitane's younger brother, Sōma Aritane, of having made false charges leading to Tomotane's incarceration, for the purposes of embezzling the monies of the former domain. This created what came to be called the "Sōma Incident" and was a major scandal of the early Meiji period. The Sōma clan hired the famous lawyer Hoshi Tōru to defend their case, which went on for years, as the legal definition of insanity and the qualifications necessary for a doctor to declare a person mentally incompetent were not yet defined in Japanese jurisprudence. On Tomotane's death in 1892, Nishigori accused the defendants of having murdered him by poison. However, after an autopsy failed to find any evidence, Nishikori was countersued for slander and was sentenced to four years in prison.

== See also ==
- List of Han
- Sōma ware
- Sōma, Fukushima
