= Futaba District, Fukushima =

District in Fukushima prefecture, Japan

Coordinates: 37°26′50″N 141°00′20″E

Location of Futaba District in Fukushima Prefecture

Futaba (双葉郡, Futaba-gun) is a district located in Fukushima Prefecture, Japan.

As of 2010, the district has a population of 72,822, which fell to 7,338 in 2015, and a density of 8.5 persons per km^{2}. The total area is 865.12 km^{2}.

== Towns and villages ==
- Futaba
- Hirono
- Namie
- Naraha
- Ōkuma
- Tomioka
- Katsurao
- Kawauchi

== See also ==
- Fukushima Daiichi nuclear disaster
