= Kawamata, Fukushima =

Kawamata 川俣町
- Town
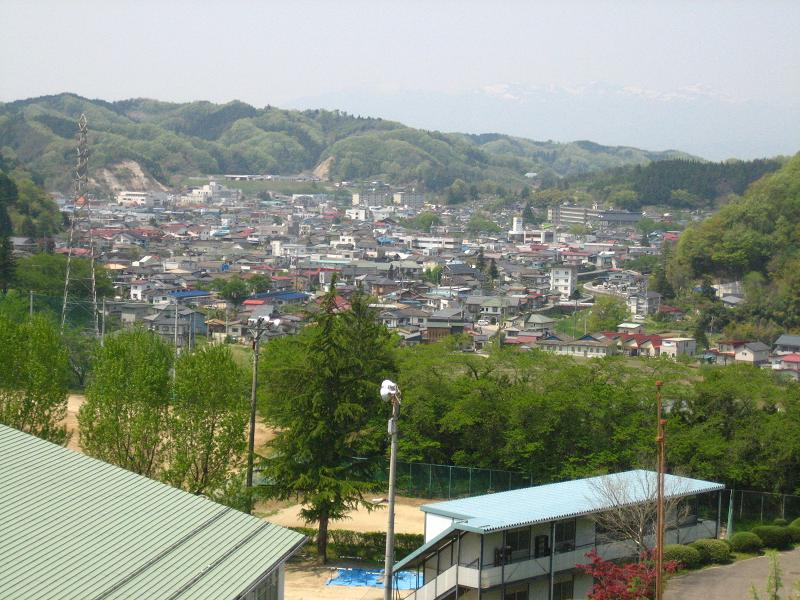
- View of Kawamata Town

- Flag Seal

- Location of Kawamata in Fukushima Prefecture

- Coordinates: 37°39′54″N 140°35′54″E
- Country: Japan
- Region: Tōhoku
- Prefecture: Fukushima
- District: Date

Government
  - Mayor: Michio Furukawa

Area
  - Total: 127.70 km^{2} (49.31 sq mi)

Population (March 2020)
  - Total: 12,917
  - Density: 101.15/km^{2} (261.98/sq mi)
- Time zone: UTC+9 (Japan Standard Time)
  - Tree: Maple
  - Flower: Mountain Azalea
  - Bird: Japanese bush warbler
- Phone number: 024-566-2111
- Address: 3-0 Gohyakuda, Kawamata-machi, Date-gun, Fukushima-ken 969–1392
- Website: Official website

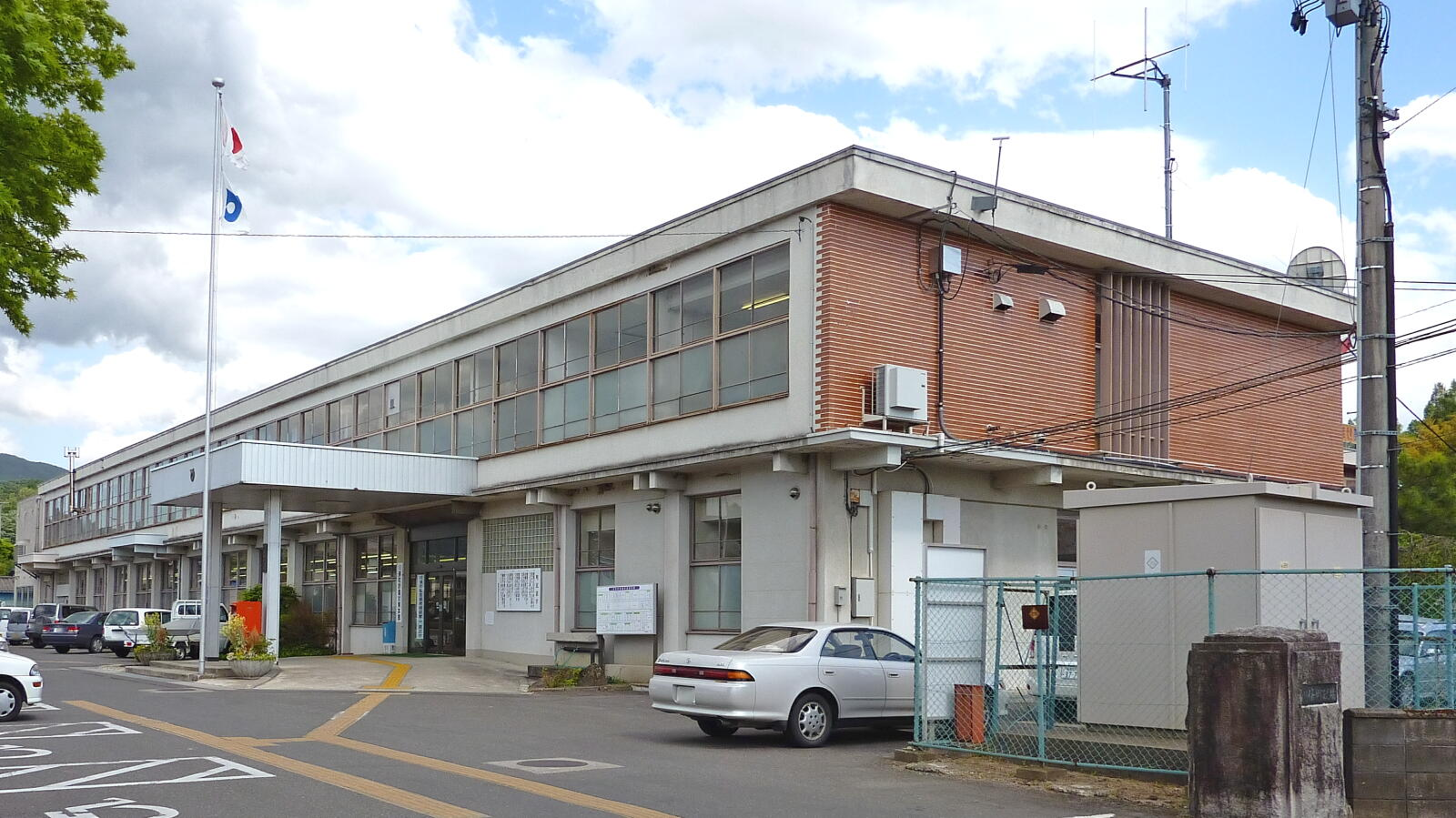
Kawamata Town Hall

Kawamata (川俣町, Kawamata-machi) is a town in Fukushima Prefecture, Japan. As of 1 March 2020, the town had an estimated population of 12917 in 5414 households, and a population density of 110 persons per km^{2}. The total area of the town was 127.7 square kilometres (49.3 sq mi).

Kawamata is known for its production of silk and silk products. In the late 6th century, Ōtomo no Koteko, also known as Otehime, came to this area. According to tradition, she is honored for having encouraged silk farming in the area. The town is also known for the raising of shamo, a special breed of game bird similar to chicken. Shamo ramen is a local speciality.

Kawamata's main annual event is the Cosquín en Japón festival, a three-day celebration of traditional Argentinian music and dance, which is held each year in October.

== Geography ==
The geographic area of Kawamata is approximately 10 km east-to-west and 20 km north-to-south; the total land area is 127.66 km^{2}. It has an altitude of 201.2 m as measured at the site of the municipal office. Kawamata is located at the confluence of two local rivers, the Hirose and the Isazawa, from which the town's name (meaning "river fork") is derived. Several other small rivers and streams run through the town.

There are four designated mountains in Kawamata: Mt. Kōdaishi (863 m), Mt. Hakubaishi (821 m), Mt. Kuchibuto (842 m), and Mt. Hanazuka (918 m).

=== Surrounding municipalities ===
- Fukushima Prefecture
  - Date
  - Fukushima
  - Iitate
  - Namie
  - Nihonmatsu

=== Subdivisions ===
The central town consists of the Kawamata neighborhood and parts of Tsuruzawa, Kogami, and Iizaka. The remaining areas are outlying neighborhoods:

- (Central) Kawamata
- Tsuruzawa
- Kogami
- Iizaka
- Ōtsunagi
- Kotsunagi
- Higashi-Fukuzawa
- Nishi-Fukuzawa
- Ojima
- Akiyama (also called Fukuda)
- Yamakiya

==== Yamakiya ====
The former village of Yamakiya (山木屋) is the largest and most sparsely populated region of Kawamata, as well as the most physically isolated. It is located in the mountains to the south-east of the central town; at 37.40 km^{2}, it occupies almost one third of Kawamata's geographic area. Within Kawamata, Yamakiya retains some of its own distinct cultural characteristics. Yamakiya is home to the Yamakiya Taiko Club, an amateur taiko drum performance group made up of young people from the community. In April 2012, several members of the club travelled to Washington, DC in the US for the 100th anniversary of the National Cherry Blossom Festival as part of a cultural exchange initiative.

One of Yamakiya's prominent facilities is the Yamakiya Skating Rink, an outdoor ice rink which is normally open during January and early February. Speed skating competitions are held for local school children every year.

The Yamakiya region was placed under mandatory evacuation (classified as a "planned evacuation zone") due to elevated levels of radiation following the 2011 earthquake and nuclear crisis. As of 10 August 2013, the evacuation status of Yamakiya was reorganized, with the majority of the area being redesignated as "an area readying for the lifting of evacuation orders", and a small area by the Namie border to remain restricted. The actual evacuation status may be lifted in spring of 2016.

== Climate ==
Kawamata has a humid subtropical climate (Köppen climate classification Cfa). The average annual temperature in Kawamata is 11.4 °C (52.5 °F). The average annual rainfall is 1,271 mm (50.0 in) with September as the wettest month. The temperatures are highest on average in August, at around 24.3 °C (75.7 °F), and lowest in January, at around −0.1 °C (31.8 °F).

== Demographics ==
Per Japanese census data, like many rural Japanese communities, Kawamata has suffered from a shrinking population over the past few decades. From a high of more than 27,000 in 1950, the population has decreased to only 15,010 in 2012. This has been correlated with a reduction in available services, including the shutting down of the Kawamata Line railway in 1972, and the closing or merging of several schools.

Historical population
Year	Pop.	±%
1920	21,451	—
1930	21,629	+0.8%
1940	22,234	+2.8%
1950	27,182	+22.3%
1960	25,983	−4.4%
1970	22,747	−12.5%
1980	21,099	−7.2%
1990	20,001	−5.2%
2000	17,751	−11.2%
2010	15,569	−12.3%
2020	12,170	−21.8%

== History ==
The area of present-day Kawamata was part of ancient Mutsu Province. Numerous Jōmon period ruins have been found in the area. During the Edo period, it was tenryō territory under direct control of the Tokugawa shogunate. After the Meiji Restoration, it was organized as part of Adachi District in the Nakadōri region of Iwaki Province with the creation of the modern municipalities system.

The origin of modern Kawamata goes back to 1876, when Kawamata Village was established; the community was subsequently redesignated as Kawamata Town with the establishment of the municipalities system on 1 April 1889. In 1955, seven neighboring villages – Fukuda, Iizaka, Kotsunagi, Ōtsunagi, Ojima, Tomita, and Yamakiya – were merged into Kawamata Town, leading to the current municipal boundaries.

Kawamata's official emblem, a stylized か (ka) hiragana designed to resemble a bird in flight, was adopted in 1965.

=== 2011 earthquake and Fukushima nuclear disaster ===
Kawamata was impacted in a number of ways by the March 2011 Tōhoku earthquake and tsunami. As an inland community, the town was not directly affected by the tsunami. However, power outages lasting up to several days (depending on area) occurred. Several buildings, including the municipal office building, suffered significant structural damage and were subsequently evacuated.

The Fukushima Daiichi nuclear disaster at the Fukushima I Nuclear Power Plant initially led to the establishment of a 30 km exclusion zone around the power station. Although Kawamata was located outside this region, in April 2011, the Japanese government established additional evacuation areas which included the Yamakiya neighborhood of Kawamata. The evacuation order will be lifted on 31 March 2017. Controls had been relaxed in August 2013 permitting decontamination work to start.

== Economy ==
The traditional industries of Kawamata were historically agriculture and textiles. Rice farming, shamo chicken, and silk goods all remain culturally important. In recent years, the manufacturing of products such as automobile parts has also become prominent.

== Education ==
As of 2012, Kawamata had six public elementary schools and two junior high schools operated by the town government. The town also operates five half-day kindergartens, and one full-day nursery school. The is one public high school operated by the Fukushima Prefectural Board of Education. Since 2011 a number of schools (kindergarten through junior high school) from neighbouring Iitate village have been housed inside temporary facilities in Kawamata.

=== Kindergartens and nursery schools ===
- Kawamata Kindergarten (川俣幼稚園, Kawamata yōchien)
- Kawamata-Minami Kindergarten (川俣南幼稚園, Kawamata minami yōchien)
- Tomita Kindergarten (富田幼稚園, Tomita yōchien)
- Fukuda Kindergarten (福田幼稚園, Fukuda yōchien)
- Yamakiya Kindergarten (山木屋幼稚園, Yamakiya yōchien) (currently sharing facilities with Kawamata-Minami Kindergarten)
- Sumiyoshi Nursery School (すみよし保育園, Sumiyoshi hoikuen)

=== Elementary schools ===
- Kawamata Elementary School (川俣小学校, Kawamata shōgakkō)
- Kawamata-Minami Elementary School (川俣南小学校, Kawamata minami shōgakkō)
- Tomita Elementary School (富田小学校, Tomita shōgakkō)
- Iizaka Elementary School (飯坂小学校, Iizaka shōgakkō)
- Fukuda Elementary School (福田小学校, Fukuda shōgakkō)
- Yamakiya Elementary School (山木屋小学校, Yamakiya shōgakkō) (currently housed inside Kawamata-Minami Elementary School)

Kawamata-Minami Elementary School was founded in 1985 from the merger of two former schools: Ōtsunagi Elementary School and Kotsunagi Elementary School. Similarly, Tomita Elementary School was founded in 1989 from the merger of Tsuruzawa and Kogami Elementary Schools.

Two other schools, Ojima Elementary School (小島小学校, Ojima shōgakkō) and Fukuzawa Elementary School (福沢小学校, Fukuzawa shōgakkō), were closed down in March 2008 due to declining enrollment. Students from these two schools were moved into Kawamata Elementary School.

Following the March 2011 earthquake and tsunami, the former Ojima Elementary School building, now a community centre, was temporarily used to house evacuees from several other municipalities close to the damaged Fukushima I nuclear power station.

=== Junior high schools ===
- Kawamata Junior High School (川俣中学校, Kawamata chūgakkō)
- Yamakiya Junior High School (山木屋中学校, Yamakiya chūgakkō) (currently housed inside Kawamata Junior High School)

Originally, various districts of Kawamata had their own junior high schools. In 1974, all except Yamakiya Junior High School were merged into Kawamata Junior High School.

=== High schools ===
- Kawamata Senior High School (川俣高等学校, Kawamata Kōtōgakkō) is located in the Iizaka district of Kawamata; like all public senior high schools in Japan, it is operated by the prefectural government rather than by the municipality.

== Transportation ==
=== Railway ===
- Kawamata is not served by any passenger train lines. The nearest railway station is Matsukawa Station on the Tōhoku Main Line. Kawamata itself has had no railway service since 1972, when the former Kawamata Line from Matsukawa, operated by Japanese National Railways (JNR), was abolished.

=== Highways ===
- National Route 114
- National Route 349
- National Route 459

Bus access is available to and from various surrounding municipalities. In particular, the East Japan Railway Company (JR East) operates buses between Kawamata and Fukushima City.

== Local attractions ==
=== Events ===
Kawamata holds various annual events throughout the year. These include:

- Kawamata Road Race (June)
- Karariko Festa (August) – a street festival to mark Obon, with dancing, fireworks, and live performances
- Shamo Matsuri (August) – a two-day exhibition celebrating the local shamo industry
- Traffic Safety Marching Band Parade (September)
- Cosquín en Japón (October) – a three-day Argentinian music festival and concert, featuring performers from around Japan and the world
- Kasuga Shrine Festival (October) – two-day autumn street festival
- Silk Fair (October) – a two-day open market for silk and other local products
