= Abukuma Highlands =

Highlands region between Fukushima, Ibaraki, and Miyagi Prefectures, Japan

Coordinates: 37°6′20.002″N 140°40′8.000″E

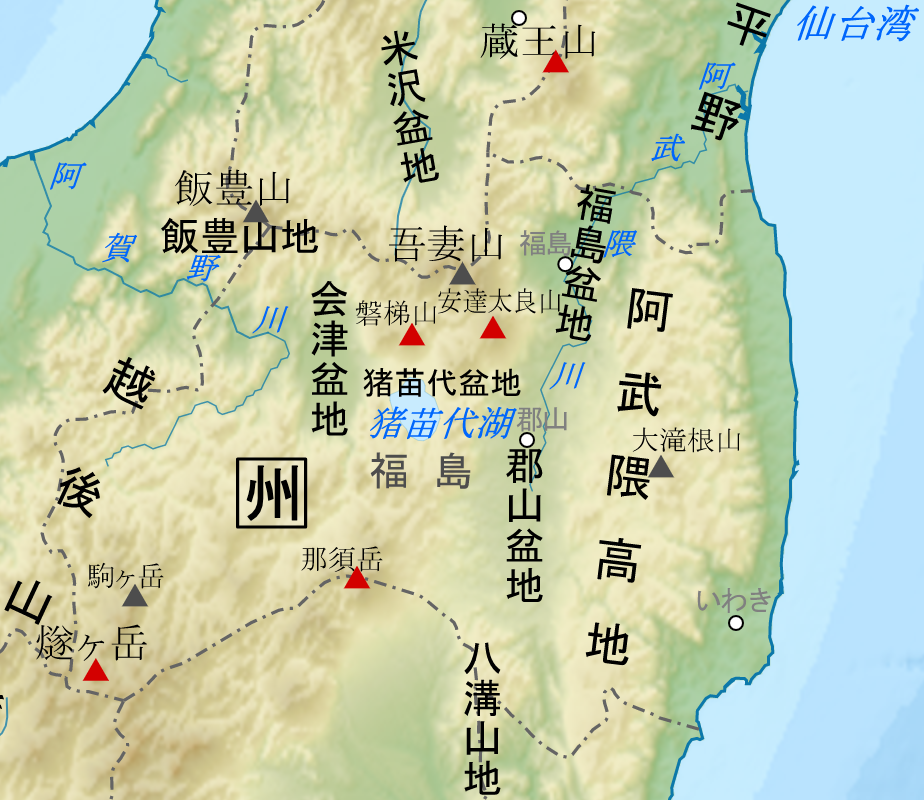
Topographic map of Fukushima Prefecture

Location of Abukuma Highlands

The Abukuma Highlands (阿武隈高地, Abukuma-kōchi) or Abukuma Mountains is a highland area of Japan that extends from the southern part of Miyagi Prefecture to the eastern part of Fukushima Prefecture and then to the northern part of Ibaraki Prefecture. Most of the highlands belong to Fukushima Prefecture. The highest peak in the highlands is Mount Ōtakine (1,192m).
