= Iitate, Fukushima =

Iitate 飯舘村
- Village
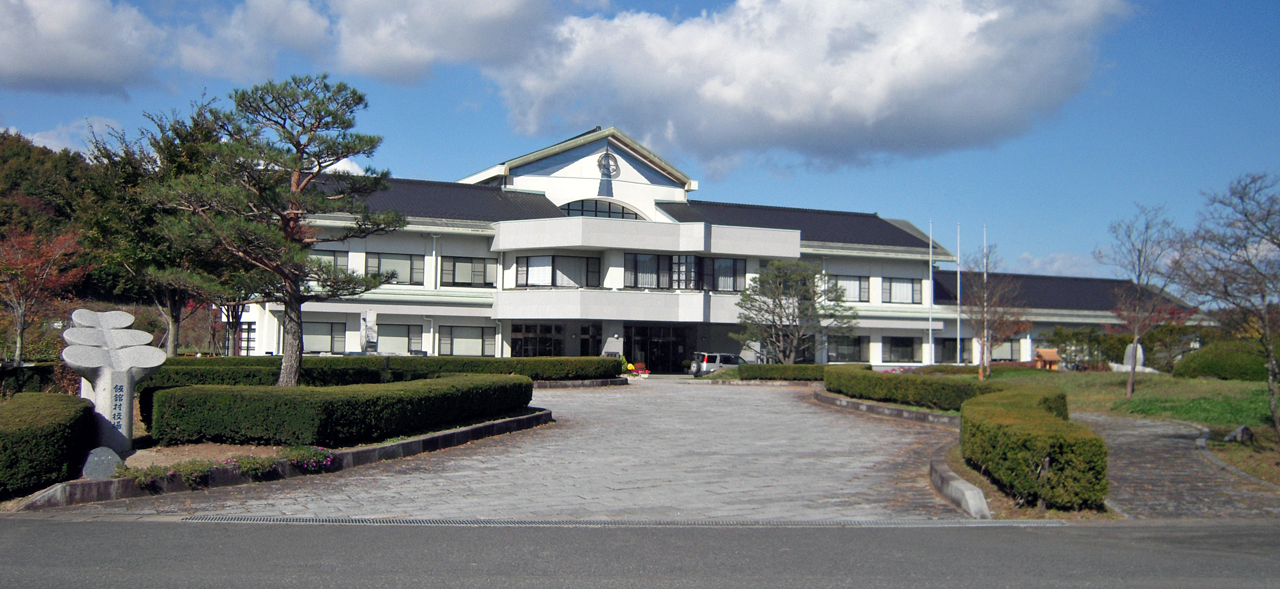
- Iitate Village Office

- Flag Seal

- Location of Iitate in Fukushima Prefecture

- Coordinates: 37°40′44.4″N 140°44′06.8″E
- Country: Japan
- Region: Tōhoku
- Prefecture: Fukushima
- District: Sōma

Area
  - Total: 230.13 km^{2} (88.85 sq mi)

Population (Feb 1, 2020)
  - Total: 1,408
  - Density: 6.118/km^{2} (15.85/sq mi)
- Time zone: UTC+9 (Japan Standard Time)
- Phone number: 24-562-4200
- Address: 580-1 Itazawa, Iitate-mura, Soma-gun, Fukushima-ken 960-1892
- Climate: Cfa/Dfa
- Website: Official website
- Symbols
- Bird: Japanese bush-warbler
- Flower: Lilium auratum
- Tree: Pinus densiflora

Iitate (飯舘村, Iitate-mura) is a village located in Fukushima Prefecture, Japan. As of 1 February 2020, the village had an actual population of 1,408, and a population density of 6.1 persons per km^{2}. The registered population per village government records was 5,946 registered residents in 1807 households as of September 30, 2017. The total area the village is 230.13 square kilometres (88.85 sq mi).

== Geography ==
Iitate is located in the Abukuma Plateau of northeastern Fukushima at a mean altitude of 500 meters. It is about 39 kilometres (24 miles) northwest of Fukushima Daiichi Nuclear Power Plant.

=== Surrounding municipalities ===
- Fukushima Prefecture
  - Date
  - Kawamata
  - Minamisōma
  - Namie
  - Sōma

=== Climate ===
Iitate has a humid subtropical climate (Köppen climate classification Cfa). The average annual temperature in Iitate is 10.2 °C. The average annual rainfall is 1359 mm with September as the wettest month.The temperatures are highest on average in August, at around 22.9 °C, and lowest in January, at around -1.2 °C.

Climate data for Iitate (1991−2020 normals, extremes 1976−present)
Month	Jan	Feb	Mar	Apr	May	Jun	Jul	Aug	Sep	Oct	Nov	Dec	Year
Record high °C (°F)	14.4 (57.9)	19.8 (67.6)	23.0 (73.4)	29.3 (84.7)	31.2 (88.2)	33.8 (92.8)	35.2 (95.4)	36.0 (96.8)	35.8 (96.4)	28.3 (82.9)	24.1 (75.4)	21.3 (70.3)	36.0 (96.8)
Mean daily maximum °C (°F)	3.4 (38.1)	4.4 (39.9)	8.5 (47.3)	15.0 (59.0)	20.3 (68.5)	22.8 (73.0)	26.5 (79.7)	27.7 (81.9)	23.6 (74.5)	18.1 (64.6)	12.7 (54.9)	6.5 (43.7)	15.8 (60.4)
Daily mean °C (°F)	−1.1 (30.0)	−0.6 (30.9)	2.9 (37.2)	8.6 (47.5)	14.0 (57.2)	17.6 (63.7)	21.4 (70.5)	22.4 (72.3)	18.4 (65.1)	12.4 (54.3)	6.7 (44.1)	1.6 (34.9)	10.4 (50.6)
Mean daily minimum °C (°F)	−6.0 (21.2)	−6.0 (21.2)	−2.6 (27.3)	2.1 (35.8)	7.7 (45.9)	12.7 (54.9)	17.4 (63.3)	18.3 (64.9)	14.0 (57.2)	7.2 (45.0)	0.9 (33.6)	−3.2 (26.2)	5.2 (41.4)
Record low °C (°F)	−21.3 (−6.3)	−20.9 (−5.6)	−18.3 (−0.9)	−13.9 (7.0)	−2.7 (27.1)	2.7 (36.9)	7.3 (45.1)	7.2 (45.0)	1.7 (35.1)	−4.6 (23.7)	−7.6 (18.3)	−21.0 (−5.8)	−21.3 (−6.3)
Average precipitation mm (inches)	60.5 (2.38)	41.1 (1.62)	77.4 (3.05)	103.1 (4.06)	97.8 (3.85)	131.7 (5.19)	174.2 (6.86)	189.5 (7.46)	204.4 (8.05)	170.5 (6.71)	56.3 (2.22)	48.4 (1.91)	1,367.4 (53.83)
Average precipitation days (≥ 1.0 mm)	7.7	6.6	9.0	8.9	9.8	12.2	14.2	12.1	12.3	9.6	7.0	8.2	117.6
Mean monthly sunshine hours	151.6	155.7	182.7	192.3	201.4	150.9	138.9	163.0	125.9	139.2	142.6	137.0	1,881
Source: Japan Meteorological Agency

== Demographics ==
Per Japanese census data, the population of Iitate peaked in the mid-1950s and has been decline since.

Historical population
Year	Pop.	±%
1920	6,387	—
1930	7,173	+12.3%
1940	8,015	+11.7%
1950	10,725	+33.8%
1960	11,129	+3.8%
1970	9,385	−15.7%
1980	8,331	−11.2%
1990	7,920	−4.9%
2000	7,093	−10.4%
2010	6,209	−12.5%
2020	1,318	−78.8%

== History ==
The area of present-day Iitate was part of Mutsu Province. During the Edo period, the area was part of the holdings of Sōma Domain. After the Meiji restoration, on April 1, 1889, the villages of Iiso, Osu and Niitate were created within Sōma District, Fukushima with the establishment of the modern municipalities system. On April 1, 1942, Osu and Niitate merged to form the village of Odate, which then merged with Iiso on September 30, 1956 to form Iitate. In September 2010, Iitate was designated one of The Most Beautiful Villages in Japan.

=== 2011 Fukushima Daiichi nuclear disaster ===
Iitate suffered from moderate damage from the 2011 Tōhoku earthquake, and was located outside the nominal 30 kilometres (19 miles) radiation exclusion zone of the Fukushima Daiichi nuclear power plant. However, as a result of wind patterns following the Fukushima Daiichi nuclear disaster, on 30 March 2011, the International Atomic Energy Agency stated that its operational criteria for evacuation were exceeded in Iitate, despite the village being outside the existing radiation exclusion zone around the plant. As a result, the entire population of the village was evacuated by government order on 22 April 2011. Some displaced children from the village were shunned after relocating for fear of contamination. In early June about 1,500 residents remained. By August, only about 120 residents, mostly elderly, remained.

In 2012, local government obtained responses from a survey from some 1,743 former residents began experiencing growing frustration and instability due to the nuclear crisis and an inability to return to the lives they were living before the disaster. Sixty percent of respondents stated that their health and the health of their families had deteriorated after evacuating.

Summarizing all responses to questions related to evacuees' current family status, one-third of all surveyed families live apart from their children, while 50.1 percent live away from other family members (including elderly parents) with whom they lived before the disaster. The survey also showed that 34.7 percent of the evacuees have suffered reductions in income of 50 percent or more since the outbreak of the nuclear disaster. A total of 36.8 percent reported a lack of sleep, while 17.9 percent reported smoking or drinking more than before they evacuated.

In March 2012, the village was divided into three zones: in the first, people were free to go in and out but not allowed to stay overnight; in the second, access was limited to short visits; and in the third area, all entry was forbidden because of elevated radiation levels that were not expected to go down within five years after the accident. All restrictions were to be lifted for a small area of northern Iitate, but the majority of the village was cleared only for the daylight return of residents. The majority of the village was to remain totally closed until at least 2016. However, in March 2014, the government postponed lifting of the restrictions on return for a year due to remaining high levels of radiation.

The evacuation order was lifted on April 1, 2017, with the exception of a small area in southern Iitate bordering on the neighbouring town of Namiie, which remains a no-entry zone. However, only a third of the former residents expressed an intention of returning.

== Economy ==
The economy of Iitate was formerly heavily dependent on agriculture.

== Education ==
Iitate had three public elementary schools and one public junior high school operated by the village, and one high school operated by the Fukushima Board of Education in March 2011. All schools were closed with the evacuation of the village in March 2011.

== Transportation ==
=== Railway ===
- Iitate does not have any passenger train services.

=== Highway ===
- National Route 399
