= Sōma clan =

Japanese samurai clan of Mutsu Province

Sōma clan 相馬氏
- Sōma clan emblem
- Home province: Shimōsa; Mutsu
- Parent house: Taira clan Chiba clan
- Titles: Various
- Founder: Sōma Morotsune
- Current head: Sōma Kazutane
- Founding year: Heian period
- Dissolution: still extant
- Ruled until: 1873 (Abolition of the han system)
- Cadet branches: Hashimoto clan, Izumi clan, Okada clan

The Sōma clan (相馬氏, Sōma-shi) was a Japanese samurai clan that ruled the northern Hamadōri region of southern Mutsu Province in the Tōhoku region of northern Japan for over 700 years, from the Kamakura period through the Meiji Restoration of 1868. The Sōma claimed descent from the Taira clan via the Chiba clan and took their name from the Chiba clan territories in Sōma District of northern Shimōsa Province. The clan moved its seat from Shimōsa to Mutsu Province in the early Kamakura period, and were confirmed as daimyō of Sōma Nakamura Domain under the Edo-period Tokugawa shogunate.

During the Boshin War of 1868–69, the Sōma clan fought on the side of the Ōuetsu Reppan Dōmei, supporting the Tokugawa regime. After the Meiji Restoration, the head of the Sōma clan became part of the kazoku peerage, with Sōma Aritane receiving the title of shishaku (Viscount).

== Origins ==
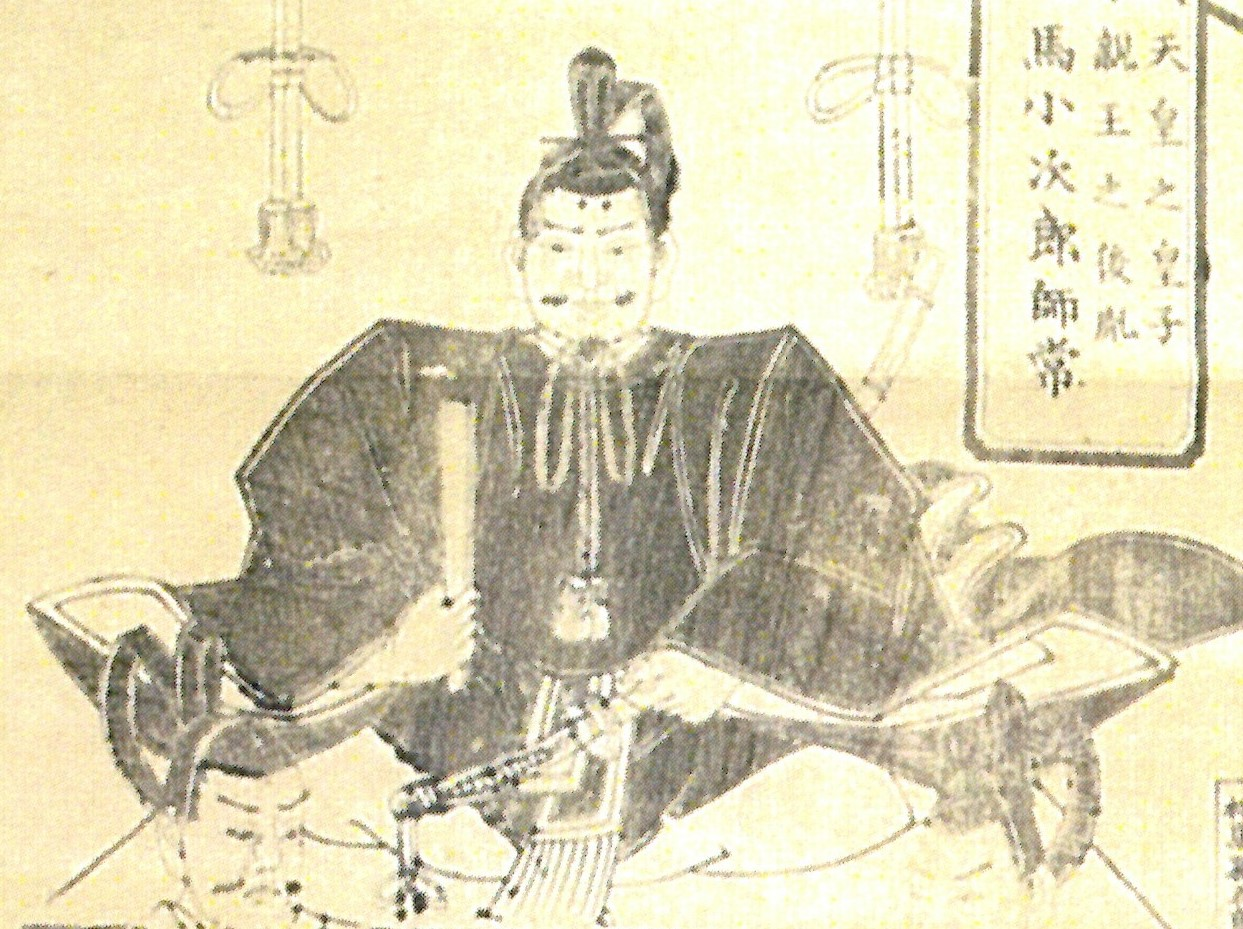
Sōma Morotsune

Sōma Morotsune was the younger son of Chiba Tsunetane, and with his father was a samurai in the service of Minamoto no Yoritomo, founding shogun of Kamakura shogunate. He took his name from the Sōma Mikuriya, a shōen controlled by Ise Shrine in what is now northwest Chiba Prefecture, which supplied horses to the shrine and the imperial household. He accompanied Yoritomo in the conquest of the Hiraizumi Fujiwara in 1189, and was awarded with estates covering three districts in southern Mutsu: Namekata, Shineha, and Uda.

During the Nanboku-chō period following the fall of the Kamakura shogunate and successive tumult, the Sōma were one of the few clans in Mutsu to remain loyal to the Northern Court.

== Sengoku period ==
Although the Sōma were a minor regional power, their territory was sandwiched between the much more powerful Satake clan to the south and the Date clan to the north. The Date under Date Masamune were especially aggressive and expansionist, and despite efforts by the 16th hereditary chieftain Sōma Yoshitane to remain aloof of the conflicts of the Sengoku period, the Date invaded his domain on 30 occasions. Together with the Ashina clan, they suffered an effective defeat following the Kōriyama Campaign in 1588. Both Sōma Yoshitane and Date Masamune submitted to Toyotomi Hideyoshi at the Siege of Odawara.

At the time of the Battle of Sekigahara, the Sōma attempted to remain neutral for fear of the powerful Satake clan to the south, which was allied with Ishida Mitsunari through marriage ties. The new Tokugawa shogunate initially decided to seize the Sōma territories, but through the intervention of several senior retainers (including their former arch-enemy Data Masamune), the shogunate relented and appointed Sōma Toshitane as a tozama daimyō over a 60,000 koku Sōma Nakamura Domain which encompassed their traditional holdings.

== Edo period ==
Sōma Toshitane married an adopted daughter of Shōgun Tokugawa Hidetada to further cement his position, and relocated his seat from Odaka Castle to Sōma Nakamura Castle, building a castle town designed on a grid-pattern in imitation of Kyoto. He also sponsored the development of Sōma ware ceramics, which remains a local specialty to the present day.

The subsequent history of the domain was largely uneventful, and the Sōma clan retained its holdings for the entirety of the Edo period, surviving until the Meiji Restoration.

The official kokudaka of the domain was officially 60,000 koku, but the actual kokudaka was almost 100,000 koku.

=== Boshin War ===
During the Boshin War of 1868–69, the Sōma clan initially attempted to remain neutral as under Sōma Toshitane the domain was relatively small and had negligible military forces. However, following the defeat of the Tokugawa forces at the Battle of Toba–Fushimi in February 1868, he was pressured by his more powerful neighbors (including Iwakitaira Domain and Sendai Domain) into joining the Ōuetsu Reppan Dōmei. The Satchō Alliance forces advanced through the Hamadōri region and captured Nakamura Castle with only token resistance a few months later. His predecessor, Sōma Michitane, formally surrendered to the Meiji government; however, the domain was not punished, and Toshitane was restored as domain governor by the new government until the abolition of the han system in 1871.

== Meiji era and beyond ==
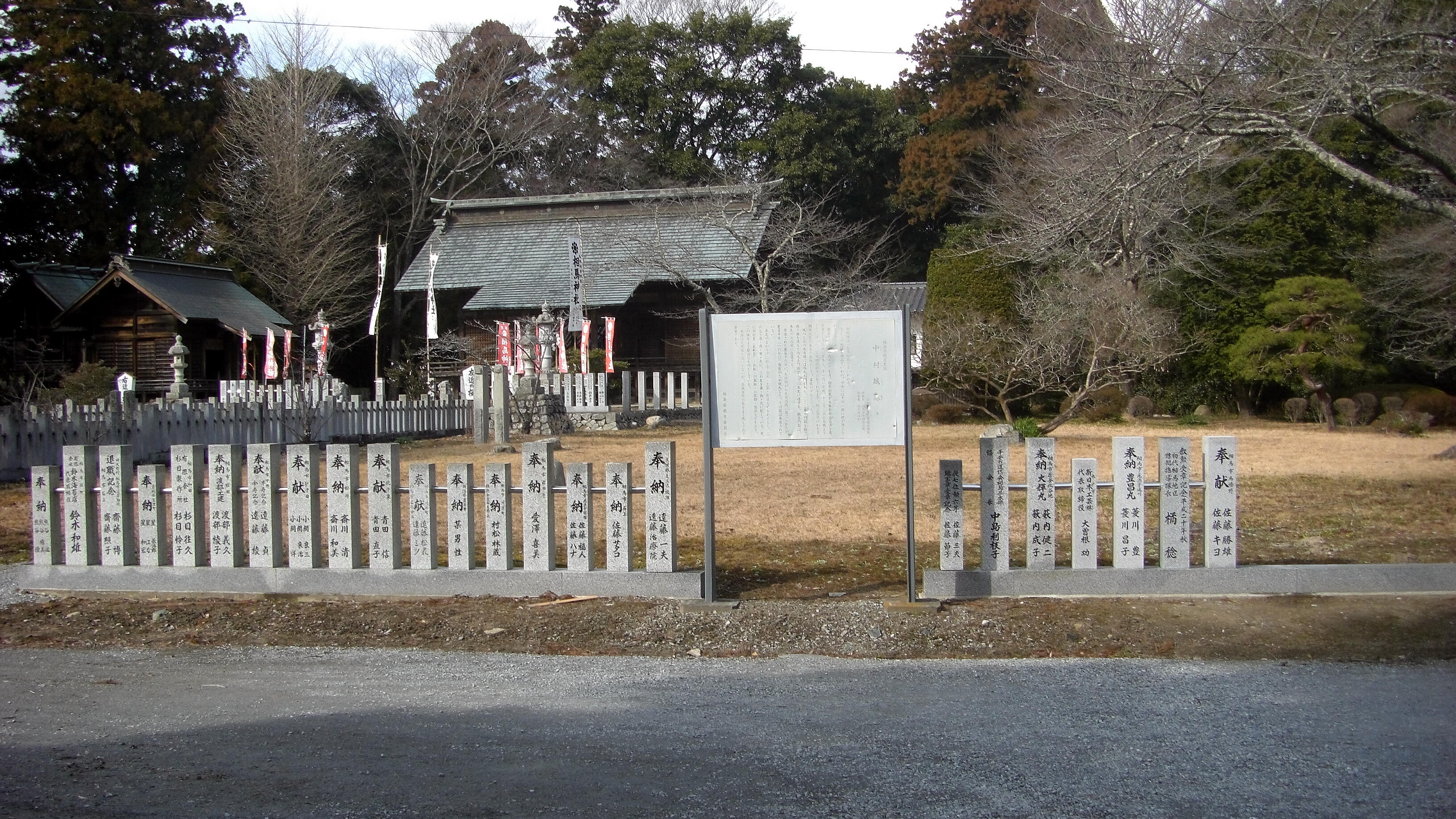
Sōma Shrine, where the ancestors of the Sōma clan are enshrined as kami

In the early years of the Meiji era, the Sōma Incident became a major political scandal. On April 14, 1879, the former daimyō of Nakamura Sōma Domain, Sōma Toshitane, was placed under house arrest by the government, after family members filed a petition accusing him of mental instability. On December 10, 1885, one of his former retainers, Nishigori Takekiyo, filed a lawsuit accusing these relatives, led by Toshitane's younger brother, Sōma Aritane, of having made false charges leading to Toshitane's incarceration, for the purposes of embezzling the monies of the former domain. The Sōma clan hired the famous lawyer Hoshi Tōru to defend their case, which went on for years, as the legal definition of insanity and the qualifications necessary for a doctor to declare a person mentally incompetent were not yet defined in Japanese jurisprudence. On Toshitane's death in 1892, Nishigori accused the defendants of having murdered him by poison. However, after an autopsy failed to find any evidence, Nishigori was countersued for slander and was sentenced to four years in prison.

Marquis Sōma Aritane (1863–1919) was the 30th hereditary chieftain of the clan, and acquired a 15,000 tsubo estate in Tokyo to the west of the Konoe family in 1910. His son, Marquis Sōma Taketane (1889–1936) served in the Imperial Household Ministry and accompanied Prince Yasuhiko Asaka to France, where he became fascinated with golf. His son, Marquis Sōma Yasutane (1913–1994) was married to a daughter of Ozaki Yukio. he also served in the Imperial Household Agency and was the 8th Chairman of the Japan Racehorse Owners Association. He was largely responsible for reviving the traditional Sōma Nomaoi Festival. He also served as mayor of the city of Sōma. The current clan head, the 34th hereditary chieftain is Sōma Yukitane, the grandson of Sōma Yasutane.

== Works cited ==
- 泉田邦彦; 今泉徹; 坂本正仁; 柴裕之; 関周一; 高橋修; 中根正人; 森木悠介 (26 March 2021). 佐々木倫郎; 千葉篤志 (eds.). 戦国佐竹氏研究の最前線 (in Japanese). Tōkyō: Yamakawa Shuppansha. ISBN 978-4-634-15181-9. NCID BC06499277, NAID 110007707970, JPNO 23512961, NDLBibID:031345101.

== Further reference ==
- Iwao, Seiichi. (1978). Biographical dictionary of Japanese history. Berkeley: University of California.
- Papinot, Edmond. (1948). Historical and Geographical Dictionary of Japan. New York: Overbeck Co.
- Papinot, Jacques Edmond Joseph. (1906) Dictionnaire d'histoire et de géographie du japon. Tokyo: Librarie Sansaisha. Nobiliaire du japon (2003, abridged online text of 1906
- List of Meiji-era Japanese nobility (accessed 15 August 2008)
