= Iwaki Province (718) =

Former province of Japan

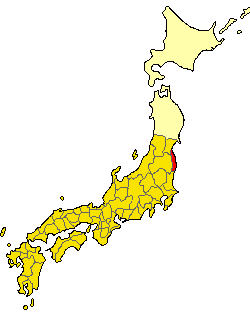
Map of Japan (718), Iwaki in red

Iwaki Province (石城国, Iwaki no Kuni) was an old province in the area that is today Fukushima Prefecture and Miyagi Prefecture.

== History ==
This iteration of Iwaki Province lasted for a brief period of time in Nara period. Established in 718 with the division of Mutsu Province, it was composed of the five districts of Iwaki (石城), Shineha (標葉), Namekata (行方), Uta (宇太), Watari (曰理) and Kikuta (菊多). Only Kikuta district was given from Hitachi Province. Abolished and returned to Mutsu sometime between 722 and 724. Kikuta moved to Mutsu at that time.

== See also ==
- Iwaki Province (1868), brief reconstitution.

== Other websites ==
Media related to Iwaki Province (718) at Wikimedia Commons

- Murdoch's map of provinces, 1903
