= Takamura =

Takamura (written: 高村 lit. "high village" or 鷹村 lit. "hawk village") is a Japanese surname. Notable people with the surname include:

== Overview ==
- Carl T. Takamura (born 1944), American politician
- Chieko Takamura (1886–1938), Japanese poet, wife of Kotaro Takamura
- Kaoru Takamura (born 1953), Japanese novelist and essayist
- Kōtarō Takamura (1883–1956), Japanese poet and sculptor, son of Koun Takamura
- Tadashi Takamura (born 1933), Japanese photographer
- Takamura Kōun (1851–1934), Japanese sculptor
- Luke Takamura (born 1964), Japanese guitarist
- Mariko Takamura, cultural icon for the deaf in Japan
- Seiichi Takamura (高村 誠一, born 1960), Japanese handball player

== Fictional characters ==
- Corinne (Corey) Takamura, character from the children's book series The Saddle Club
- Eiko Takamura, character from the Japanese drama Haruka 17
- Dr. Fuji Takamura, character in the film Highlander III: The Sorcerer
- Keiko Takamura, character from the anime series Uta Kata
- Koji Takamura, character from the manga series Clamp School Paranormal Investigators
- Mamoru Takamura, character from the manga/anime series Fighting Spirit (はじめの一歩, Hajime no Ippo)
- Masaki Takamura (Mason Templar), from the manga/anime series Miracle Girls
- Shouichirou Takamura, human guise of the monster of the week in the Tokusatsu TV series, Gosei Sentai Dairanger
- Suou Takamura, character from manga/anime series Clamp School Detectives
- Tsubaki Takamura, character in the anime series Sakura Wars
- Yukari Takamura, character from the anime OVA Blazing Transfer Student
- Hiroka Takamura, minor character from the manga/anime series Shadow Star

== See also ==
- Ono no Takamura (also known as Sangi no Takamura) (802–853), an early Heian period scholar and poet
