= Motomiya =

Motomiya 本宮市
- City
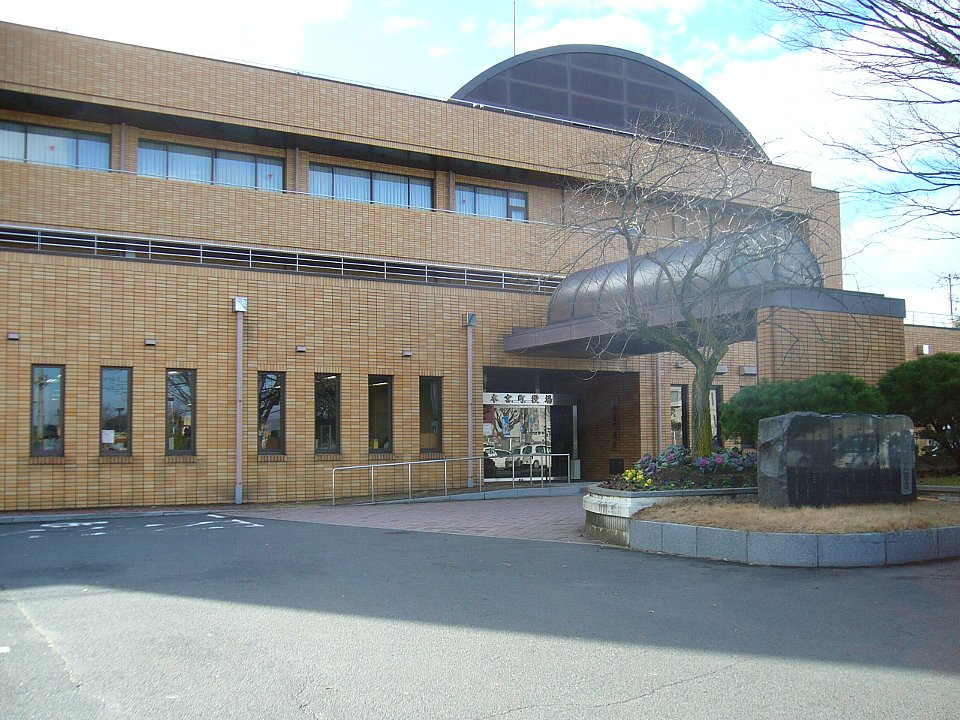
- Motomiya City Hall

- Flag Seal

- Location of Motomiya in Fukushima Prefecture

- Coordinates: 37°30′47.5″N 140°23′37.8″E
- Country: Japan
- Region: Tōhoku
- Prefecture: Fukushima

Government
  - Mayor: Gigyo Takamatsu

Area
  - Total: 88.02 km^{2} (33.98 sq mi)

Population (March 1, 2020)
  - Total: 30,401
  - Density: 345.4/km^{2} (894.5/sq mi)
- Time zone: UTC+9 (Japan Standard Time)
- − Tree: Hamilton's Spindle Tree (Euonymus hamiltonianus)
- − Flower: Peony
- − Bird: Japanese bush warbler
- Phone number: 0243-33-1111
- Address: 212 aza Bansei, Motomiya, Motomiya-shi, Fukushima-ken 969-1192
- Website: Official website

Motomiya (本宮市, Motomiya-shi) is a city located in north-central Fukushima Prefecture, Japan. As of 1 March 2020, the city had an estimated population of 30,401 in 10,680 households and a population density of 350 persons per km^{2}. The total area of the city was 88.02 square kilometres (33.98 sq mi). It is the smallest city in Fukushima Prefecture, both in terms of population and size.

== Geography ==
Located in the center of Fukushima Prefecture, Motomiya possesses a wide range of geographic features from the hills in the east, to the plains in the west. The average elevation of the city is about 200 meters above sea level. The city is 400 to 500 meters above sea level in some areas.

Running through Motomiya, the Abukuma River divides the city in two. On the former Motomiya Town side, bordered by the Ōu Mountains (including Mount Adatara) in the west, and the Abukuma River in the east, flat plains run north to south extending into the Kōriyama Basin. The mountains to the north in Ōtama Village and Kōriyama serve as the sources for several rivers and streams including the Hyakunichi River (百日川), Adatara River (安達太良川), Seto River (瀬戸川), and Gohyaku River (五百川). The Hyakunichi River and Adatara River share the same source but diverge downstream. The former Shirasawa Village is surrounded by gentle rolling hills.

== Climate ==
Motomiya has a humid continental climate (Köppen Cfa) characterized by mild summers and cold winters with heavy snowfall. The average annual temperature in Motomiya is 12.1 °C. The average annual rainfall is 1212 mm with September as the wettest month. The temperatures are highest on average in August, at around 25.1 °C, and lowest in January, at around 0.3 °C.

=== Surrounding municipalities ===
- Fukushima Prefecture
  - Kōriyama
  - Miharu
  - Nihonmatsu
  - Ōtama

== Demographics ==
According to 2005 census data, Motomiya lost population for the first time in 25 years, falling to 31,367 residents. Per Japanese census data, the population of Motomiya peaked around 2000, but has slightly declined since.

Historical population
Year	Pop.	±%
1920	20,612	—
1930	22,920	+11.2%
1940	24,407	+6.5%
1950	30,565	+25.2%
1960	29,108	−4.8%
1970	26,512	−8.9%
1980	27,732	+4.6%
1990	29,114	+5.0%
2000	31,541	+8.3%
2010	31,489	−0.2%
2020	30,236	−4.0%

== History ==
The area of present-day Motomiya was part of ancient Mutsu Province. The oldest known record refers to the area of Motomiya as "Honmoku" (本牧). Later in the Nara period, the characters for Honmoku were rewritten as (本目), also pronounceable as Motome. Motome was then rewritten as (木目). Then in the 11th century, it became the current Motomiya (本宮). The origins of the name Motomiya, literally meaning "Central Shrine," refer to the Adatara Jinja (安達太良神社), a Shinto shrine in the city's northern district.

As a starting point for roads to Aizu, Miharu, Sōma, and many other destinations, Motomiya became well known as an inn town. In addition, with the growth of lesser roads to Aizu, Adachi no Umaya (安達駅), a government-maintained rest stop and messenger station, was established in Motomiya. Currently, the stone marker indicating the start of the Aizu road is preserved at the Motomiya City Historical Folk Museum. Date Masamune (伊達政宗) used Motomiya as a base during the Battle of Hitotoribashi (人取橋の戦い). Afterwards during the Edo period Tokugawa shogunate, Motomiya was part of the holding of Nihonmatsu Domain. During the Boshin War a number of battles were fought within the city limits.

After the Meiji Restoration, the area was organized as part of Adachi District in the Nakadōri region of Iwaki Province. The town of Motomiya was established with the creation of the modern municipalities system on April 1, 1889. During the Meiji and Taishō period, the Motomiya Electric Corporation was established and constructed a power plant in present Otama Village's Tamanoi district which provided electricity to the area. From this point many famous industries were born in the area. During the Showa era, Gunze, a Japanese textiles company, opened a factory and began operations in Motomiya. During World War II, Allied bombers attacked Motomiya, because the Gunze factories manufactured cloth used to cover the wings of Mitsubishi Zero fighters.

After the war, Japan entered a time of rapid economic growth, and industrial parks were zoned and constructed in Motomiya, Arai, Nukazawa, and Shiraiwa districts. Soon after, Asahi Beer was enticed to construct a brewery in the city limits.

In the 1980s, mid-size housing developments such as the Northern Kōriyama New Town and Hikari ga Oka developments were begun as an influx of workers to Kōriyama and Fukushima created a demand for bedroom communities. The city of Motomiya was established on January 1, 2007, by the merger of the former town of Motomiya absorbing the village of Shirasawa (both from Adachi District).

=== Municipal timeline ===
- 1871 − Motomiya Village (本宮村), Aota Village (青田村), Arai Village (荒井村), Niita Village(仁井田村), Inashirota Village (苗代田村), Haneseishi Village(羽瀬石村), Sagehi Village (下樋村), Sekishita Village (関下村), Takagi Village (高木村), Wada Village (和田村), Nukazawa Village (糠沢村), Shiraiwa Village (白岩村), Nagaya Village (長屋村), Inazawa Village (稲沢村), Matsuzawa Village (松沢村) were formed.
- April 1, 1889 − Motomiya Town, Aota Village, Arai Village, Niita Village, Iwane Village (岩根村, formed from Inashirota, Haneseishi, Sagehi Villages and later Sekishita Village), Wagisawa Village (和木沢村, formed from Wada, Takagi and Nukazawa Village), and Shiraiwa Village (白岩村, formed from Shiraiwa, Nagaya, Inazawa, and Matsuzawa Villages) were formed.
- April 1, 1954 − Motomiya annexed Aota, Arai, Niita Villages
- April 30, 1955 − Wagisawa Village was dissolved with Takagi District being added to Motomiya Town, and Wada and Nukazawa Districts being added to Shiraiwa Village.
- March 31, 1956 − Motomiya absorbed Iwane Village.
- January 1, 2007 − Motomiya absorbed the village of Shirasawa (also from Adachi District) to create the city of Motomiya.

=== City districts ===
- Motomiya, 本宮

This is the original Motomiya area, and includes the city hall and government offices Portions of the former agricultural northern area have been converted to industrial and residential use.

- Aota, 青田

This district is a typical farming area. While the eastern half is undergoing rapid development thanks to its proximity to National Route 4, the western half remains largely agricultural.

- Arai, 荒井

This district has well-developed retail and industrial areas. Many large shopping centers and factories are located in this area.

- Niita, 仁井田

This is a geographically narrow district. Because of its shape, homes and businesses line the roads giving it an appearance reminiscent of the Showa era.

- Iwane, 岩根

The northern part of this district is mountainous, while the southern part is farmland. The origin of the district's name comes from the large instances of peculiarly shaped rocks. Even now, specimens can still be seen. A rise in the district's population can be attributed to the Mizuki ga Oka housing development.

- Sekishita, 関下

This district is a farming area following the Abukuma River with large belts of worked arable land.

- Takagi, 高木

This is the downtown district. Like Niita District, homes and shops line the road as in the Showa era. Constructed above in the hills, Kita Koriyama New Town has contributed to a population increase in this district.

- Shiraiwa, 白岩

This was the nucleus of the former Shirasawa Village, and still contains the Shirasawa gymnasium, Yume Library, Village Sports Grounds, Community Center, Culture Center and many other civic buildings. Nestled in the hills, farmers have taken to growing rice and crops in small fields between the slopes.

- Nukazawa, 糠沢

A quiet farming area on the western part of former Shirasawa Village, the opening of Hikari ga Oka housing development makes this district one of the most populous in the former Shirasawa Village.

- Wada, 和田

This district is a farming area on the northern part of former Shirasawa Village. It is home to the Wanda Spring.

- Inazawa, 稲沢

Having won prizes for demonstrating "what a farming village should be," this district is a notable example of a Japanese farming community.

- Nagaya, 長屋

This district is another mountainous farming district with farming practices similar to Shiraiwa.

- Matsuzawa, 松沢

== Government ==
Motomiya has a mayor-council form of government with a directly elected mayor and a unicameral city legislature of 20 members. Tamura, together with Adachi District contributes one member to the Fukushima Prefectural Assembly. In terms of national politics, the city is part of Fukushima 2nd district of the lower house of the Diet of Japan.

=== Motomiya City civic centers ===
- Motomiya City Hall, 本宮市役所 (Formerly Motomiya Town Offices, 本宮町役場)
- Shirasawa Consolidated District Offices, 白沢総合支所 (Formerly Shirasawa Village Offices, 白沢村役場)
  - Iwane District Offices, 岩根支所
  - Shiraiwa District Offices, 白岩支所
- Discussions regarding the relocation of the Shirasawa Consolidated District Offices from Nukazawa district to Shiraiwa district have been completed, and the move will be begun soon.

=== Police department ===
- Motomiya Police Station (currently slated to be abolished due to budget cuts with duties being divided between Nihonmatsu and Northern Kōriyama Police Stations)
  - Iwane Police Home/Offices, 岩根駐在所
  - Shiraiwa Police Home/Offices, 白岩駐在所
  - Shirasawa Police Home/Offices, 白沢駐在所

=== Post office branches ===
- Motomiya Branch
- Motomiya Northern Branch
- Iwane Branch
- Arai Japan Post Insurance Branch
- Shirasawa Branch

=== Fire department ===
- Adachi Administrative District Combined Southern Fire Station

== Industry ==
=== Agriculture ===
In 2002, rice paddies produced superior quality rice (Koshi hikari type) worth 1.6 billion yen.

The former Wagisawa Village was a pure farming village. Even at present, agriculture is very active. The former Motomiya Town still is heavily invested in the cultivation of rice, fruits and produce and poultry. In the former Shirasawa Village, sericulture is still active. Of these, the sericulture industry's equipment has been designated a National Treasure (国の有形記念物).

=== Industry ===
Shipping revenues: 290.5 billion yen (2002)

- Asahi Beer Fukushima Plant

=== City specialties ===
- Motomiya nattō
- Motomiya poultry
- Tororo Imo (A specialty of former Shirasawa Village, it is still marketed as "Motomiya City, Shirasawa grown" even though there is no official Motomiya City, Shirasawa area.)

== Parks ==
- Hebi no Hana Playground, 蛇の鼻遊園
- Mizuiro Park, みずいろ公園
- Takagi Athletics Field, 高木総合運動公園

== Education ==
Motomiya has seven public elementary schools and three public junior high school operated by the town government, and one public high school operated by the Fukushima Board of Education.

=== High schools (ages 16−18) ===
- Motomiya High School

=== Junior high schools (ages 13−15) ===
- Motomiya 1st Junior High School (students from Motomiya and Motomiya Mayumi Elementary School areas)
- Motomiya 2nd Junior High School (students from Gohyakugawa and Iwane Elementary School areas)
- Shirasawa Junior High School (students from Nukazawa, Shiraiwa and Wada Elementary School areas)

=== Elementary schools (ages 7−12) ===
- Iwane Elementary School (students from former Motomiya Town's Iwane district)
- Gohyakugawa Elementary School (students from former Motomiya Town's Aota, Arai and Niita districts)
- Motomiya Elementary School (students from former Motomiya Town's northern area)
- Motomiya Mayumi Elementary School (students from former Motomiya Town's southern area)
- Nukazawa Elementary School (students from former Shirasawa Village's Nukazawa district)
- Shiraiwa Elementary School (students from former Shirasawa Village's Shiraiwa district)
- Wada Elementary School (students from former Shirasawa Village's Wada district)

=== Kindergarten and preschools (ages 4−6) ===
- Motomiya 1st Preschool
- Motomiya 2nd Preschool
- Motomiya 3rd Preschool
- Motomiya 4th Preschool
- Shirasawa Preschool
- Gohyakugawa Kindergarten
- Iwane Kindergarten
- Nukazawa Kindergarten
- Shiraiwa Kindergarten
- Wada Kindergarten
- Gakko Honin Motomiya Kindergarten
- Komei Preschool
- Donguri Preschool
- Motomiya Children's House

== Transportation ==
With the early construction of Motomiya Station on the Japanese rail network, Motomiya was an early departure point for people leaving for Tokyo. However, predating rail links, roads leading to towns all over Fukushima including Aizu City, Soma City, and Miharu City converged here, making Motomiya a hub for transportation. Even though it had only gravel roads, the transportation industry quickly grew, and with it, the bus and taxi services as well. Since these times, much of the traffic has been diverted to nearby Koriyama and Nihonmatsu. But even now, roads to Aizu from National Route 4 (Prefectural Route 8, Motomiya−Atami line), and roads to the Tosaki(戸崎) traffic circle such as Prefectural Route 118 from Obama (小浜) (Nihonmatsu) and Route 146 from Ishimushiro(石筵) (Kōriyama) converge in Motomiya, still making it an important hub for transportation and large numbers of freight trucks still pass through. The Tōhoku Shinkansen passes through Motomiya, but there is no station.

=== Railway ===
- JR East − Tōhoku Main Line
  - Motomiya – Gohyakugawa

=== Buses ===
- Fukushima Public Transportation
- Motomiya City Bus

=== Highway ===
- Tōhoku Expressway, Motomiya Interchange
- Ban-etsu Expressway
- National Route 4

==== Prefectural routes ====
- Fukushima Prefectural Route 8 (Motomiya to Atami)
- Fukushima Prefectural Route 28 (Motomiya to Miharu)
- Fukushima Prefectural Route 30 (Motomiya to Tsuchiyu)
- Fukushima Prefectural Route 73 (Nihonmatsu to Kaneya)
- Fukushima Prefectural Route 40 (Iino to Miharu to Ishikawa)

== Notable people from Motomiya ==
- Tomohisa Nemoto, professional baseball player
