= Ōtama, Fukushima =

Ōtama 大玉村
- Village
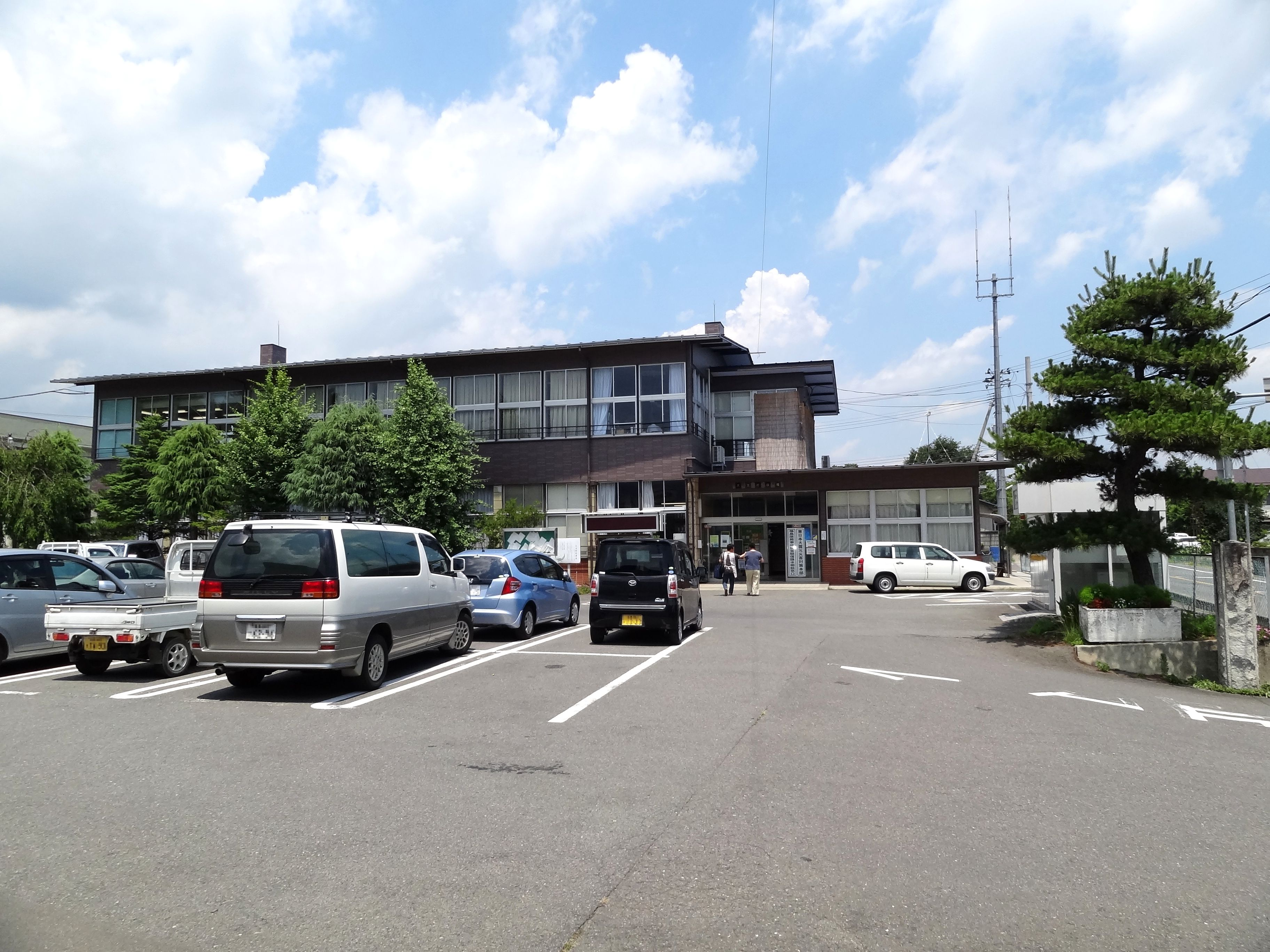
- Ōtama Village Hall

- Flag Seal

- Location of Ōtama in Fukushima Prefecture

- Coordinates: 37°32′04″N 140°22′16″E
- Country: Japan
- Region: Tōhoku
- Prefecture: Fukushima
- District: Adachi

Area
  - Total: 79.44 km^{2} (30.67 sq mi)

Population (February 2020)
  - Total: 8,781
  - Density: 110.5/km^{2} (286.3/sq mi)
- Time zone: UTC+9 (Japan Standard Time)
- City symbols
  - Tree: Pinus densiflora
  - Flower: Sakura
  - Bird: Green pheasant
- Phone number: 0243-48-3131
- Address: Tamai Hoshinai 70 Ōtama-mura, Adachi-gun, Fukushima-ken 969-1392
- Website: Official website

Ōtama (大玉村, Ōtama-mura) is a village located in Fukushima Prefecture, Japan. As of 29 February 2020, the village had an estimated population of 8,781, and a population density of 110 persons per km^{2} in 2896 households. The total area of the village was 79.44 square kilometres (30.67 sq mi). In 2016, Ōtama was selected as one of The Most Beautiful Villages in Japan.

== Geography ==
Ōtama is located in north-central Fukushima prefecture, sandwiched between the cities of Kōriyama and Nihonmatsu.

- Lakes: Miharu Dam
- Mountains: Mount Adatara (1728m)
- Rivers: Abukuma River

=== Neighboring municipalities ===
- Fukushima Prefecture
  - Kōriyama
  - Motomiya
  - Nihonmatsu

== Demographics ==
Per Japanese census data, the population of Ōtama peaked around the year 1950 but has remained relatively steady over the past 50 years.

Historical population
| Year | Pop. | ±% |
|---|---|---|
| 1920 | 6,262 | — |
| 1930 | 7,021 | +12.1% |
| 1940 | 7,386 | +5.2% |
| 1950 | 9,315 | +26.1% |
| 1960 | 8,944 | −4.0% |
| 1970 | 7,788 | −12.9% |
| 1980 | 7,837 | +0.6% |
| 1990 | 8,163 | +4.2% |
| 2000 | 8,407 | +3.0% |
| 2010 | 8,574 | +2.0% |

== Climate ==
Ōtama has a humid continental climate (Köppen Cfa) characterized by mild summers and cold winters with heavy snowfall. The average annual temperature in Ōtama is 10.8 °C. The average annual rainfall is 1288 mm with September as the wettest month. The temperatures are highest on average in August, at around 24.0 °C, and lowest in January, at around -1.2 °C.

== History ==
The area of present-day Ōtama was part of ancient Mutsu Province and the area has many burial mounds from the Kofun period. The area formed part of the holdings of Nihonmatsu Domain during the Edo period. After the Meiji Restoration, it was organized as part of Nakadōri region of Iwaki Province, administratively within Adachi District. The villages of Oyama and Tamanoi were established on April 1, 1899, with the creation of the modern municipalities system. Ōtama Village was formed on March 31, 1955, with the merger of the two villages.

== Economy ==
The economy of Ōtama is primarily agricultural.

== Education ==
Ōtama has two public elementary schools and one public junior high school operated by the village government. The village does not have a high school.

- Ōtama Middle School
- Ōtama Oyama Elementary School
- Ōtama Tamanoi Elementary School

== Transportation ==
=== Railway ===
Ōtama is not served by any passenger railway service, although the Tohoku Main Line passes through the village.

=== Highway ===
- National Route 4

== International relations ==
- Machu Picchu, Peru, friendship city since December 26, 2015
