= Nihonmatsu =

Nihonmatsu 二本松市
- City
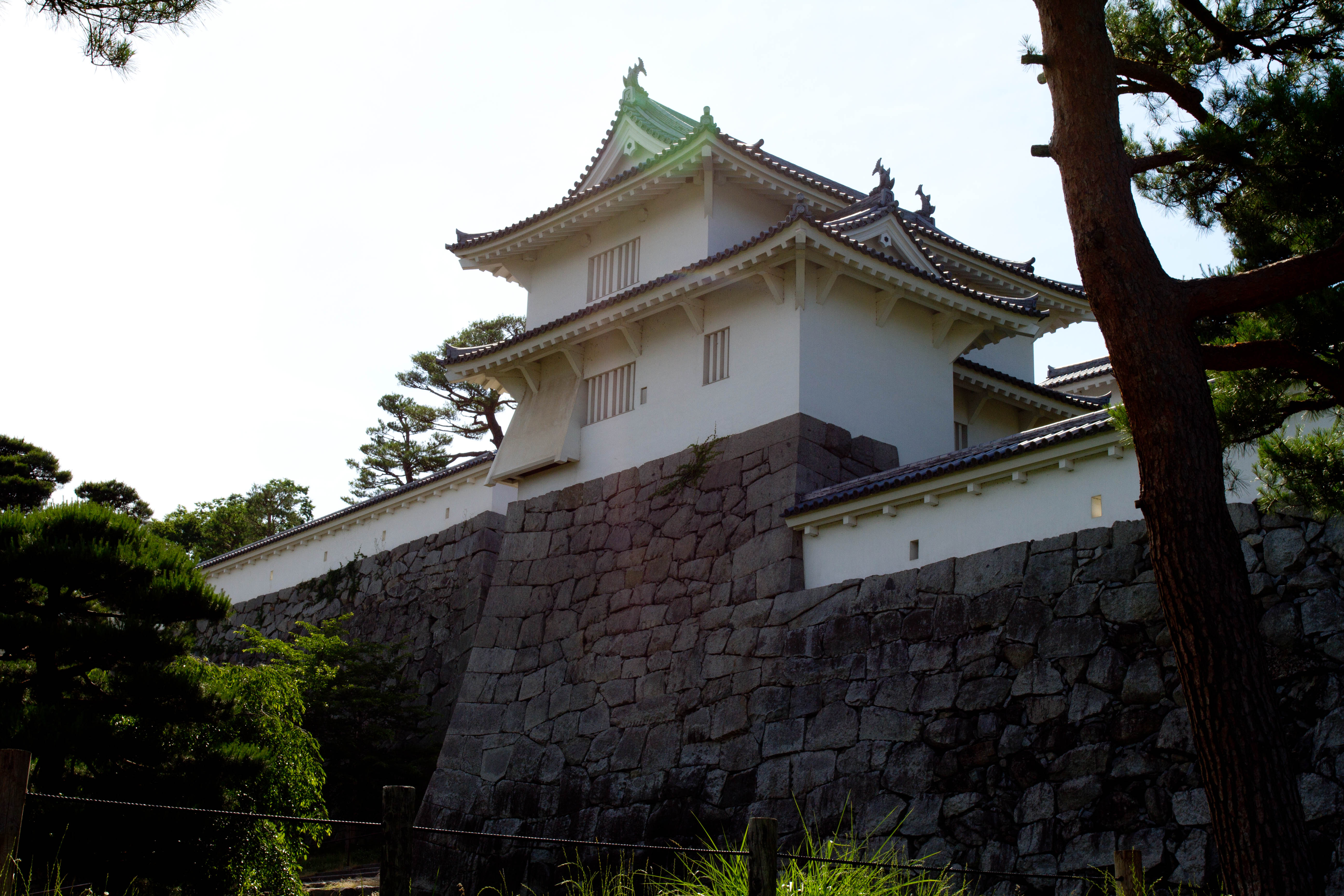
- Minowa Gate in Nihonmatsu Castle

- Flag Seal

- Location of Nihonmatsu in Fukushima Prefecture

- Coordinates: 37°35′5.5″N 140°25′52.2″E
- Country: Japan
- Region: Tōhoku
- Prefecture: Fukushima
- First official recorded: 769 AD
- City settled: October 1, 1958

Government
  - Mayor: Hiroshi Shinno

Area
  - Total: 344.42 km^{2} (132.98 sq mi)

Population (April 2020)
  - Total: 54,013
  - Density: 156.82/km^{2} (406.17/sq mi)
- Time zone: UTC+9 (Japan Standard Time)
- Phone number: 0243-23-1111
- Address: 403-1 Kanairo, Nihonmatsu-shi, Fukushima-ken 964-8601
- Climate: Cfa
- Website: Official website
- Symbols
- Bird: Japanese bush warbler
- Flower: Chrysanthemum
- Tree: Sakura

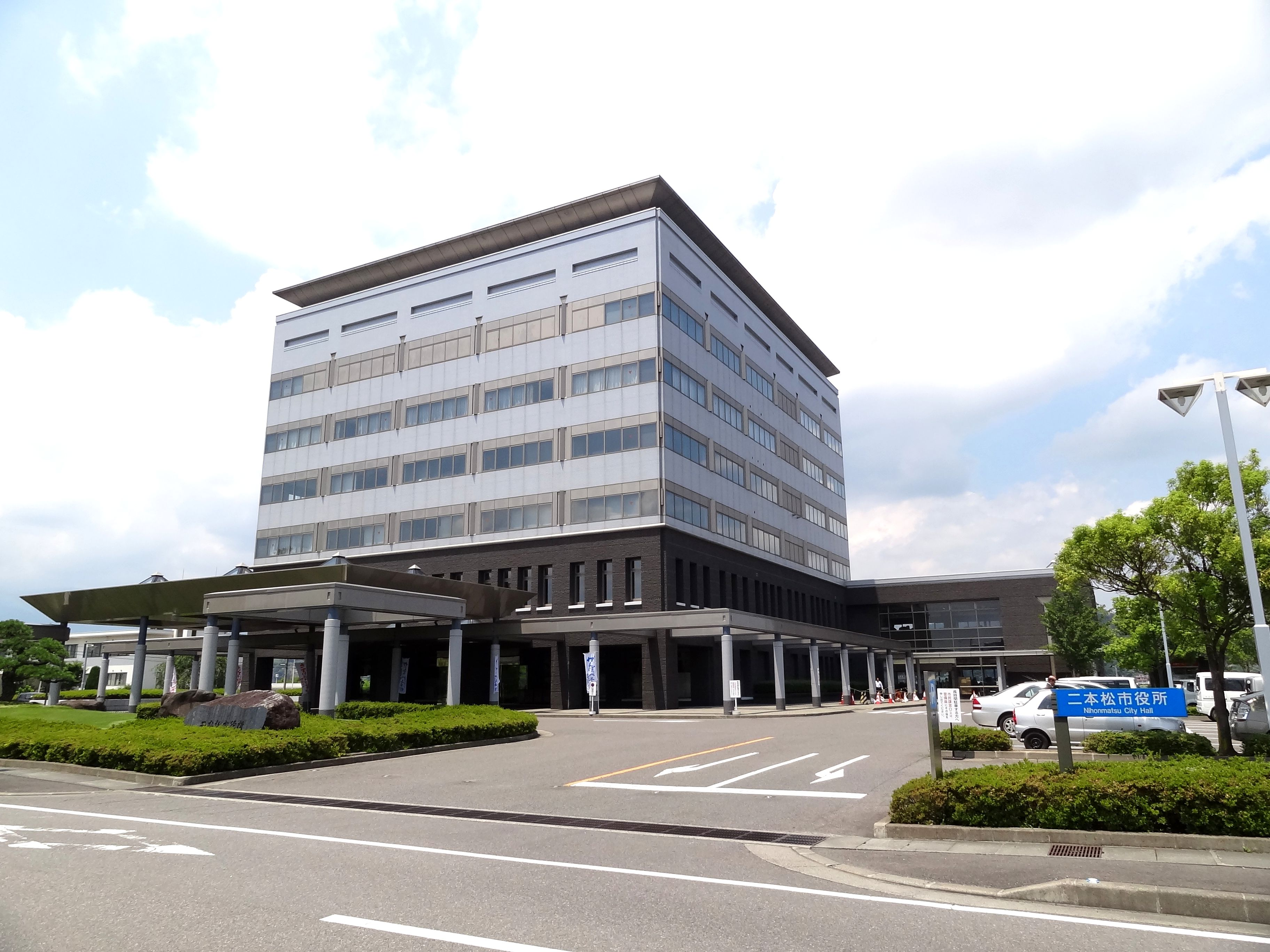
Nihonmatsu City Hall

Nihonmatsu (二本松市, Nihonmatsu-shi) is a city in Fukushima Prefecture, Japan. As of 1 April 2020, the city has an estimated population of 54,013 in 20,179 households, and a population density of 160 persons per km^{2}. The total area of the city was 344.42 square kilometres (132.98 sq mi). The Adachi neighborhood of Nihonmatsu was the birthplace of artist Chieko Takamura, subject of the book of poems Chieko's Sky (智恵子抄, Chiekoshō; literally "Chieko Selections"), written by her husband Kōtarō Takamura.

== Geography ==
Nihonmatsu is located in the Nakadōri section of Fukushima prefecture, between the cities of Fukushima and Kōriyama. It is approximately 250 km from central Tokyo. Nihonmatsu's western border consists of the Adatara mountain range. The Abukuma River runs through the eastern part (forming the border between the former towns of Adachi and Tōwa), flowing from south to north.

- Lakes: Miharu Dam
- Mountains: Mount Adatara (1,728 m), Hiyama (1,054 m), Kohatayama (666.3 m)
- Rivers: Abukuma River

=== Neighboring municipalities ===
- Fukushima Prefecture
  - Fukushima
  - Inawashiro
  - Katsurao
  - Kawamata
  - Kōriyama
  - Motomiya
  - Namie
  - Ōtama
  - Tamura

=== Climate ===
Nihonmatsu has a humid subtropical climate (Köppen Cfa) characterized by mild summers and cold winters with heavy snowfall. The average annual temperature in Nihonmatsu is 12.0 °C. The average annual rainfall is 1215 mm with September as the wettest month. The temperatures are highest on average in August, at around 25.0 °C, and lowest in January, at around 0.3 °C.

Climate data for Nihonmatsu (1991–2020 normals, extremes 1976–present)
Month	Jan	Feb	Mar	Apr	May	Jun	Jul	Aug	Sep	Oct	Nov	Dec	Year
Record high °C (°F)	16.6 (61.9)	19.9 (67.8)	24.1 (75.4)	30.2 (86.4)	34.7 (94.5)	36.0 (96.8)	38.0 (100.4)	38.0 (100.4)	37.4 (99.3)	31.4 (88.5)	26.0 (78.8)	20.4 (68.7)	38.0 (100.4)
Mean daily maximum °C (°F)	5.4 (41.7)	6.5 (43.7)	10.4 (50.7)	16.8 (62.2)	22.4 (72.3)	25.2 (77.4)	28.4 (83.1)	29.8 (85.6)	25.4 (77.7)	19.6 (67.3)	13.9 (57.0)	8.1 (46.6)	17.7 (63.9)
Daily mean °C (°F)	0.8 (33.4)	1.5 (34.7)	4.8 (40.6)	10.6 (51.1)	16.1 (61.0)	19.7 (67.5)	23.4 (74.1)	24.4 (75.9)	20.3 (68.5)	14.3 (57.7)	8.4 (47.1)	3.3 (37.9)	12.3 (54.1)
Mean daily minimum °C (°F)	−3.3 (26.1)	−3.1 (26.4)	−0.4 (31.3)	4.7 (40.5)	10.4 (50.7)	15.2 (59.4)	19.6 (67.3)	20.6 (69.1)	16.3 (61.3)	9.7 (49.5)	3.4 (38.1)	−1.0 (30.2)	7.7 (45.9)
Record low °C (°F)	−12.6 (9.3)	−12.5 (9.5)	−10.6 (12.9)	−5.2 (22.6)	1.0 (33.8)	5.6 (42.1)	9.5 (49.1)	11.3 (52.3)	4.3 (39.7)	−1.7 (28.9)	−4.6 (23.7)	−12.3 (9.9)	−12.6 (9.3)
Average precipitation mm (inches)	42.5 (1.67)	34.0 (1.34)	74.0 (2.91)	86.8 (3.42)	91.5 (3.60)	125.5 (4.94)	185.5 (7.30)	145.9 (5.74)	166.6 (6.56)	137.6 (5.42)	58.8 (2.31)	40.7 (1.60)	1,189.3 (46.82)
Average precipitation days (≥ 1.0 mm)	7.2	6.4	8.8	8.4	9.6	11.3	14.1	11.6	11.7	8.9	6.5	7.3	111.9
Mean monthly sunshine hours	132.7	142.7	162.7	175.4	181.7	129.0	122.0	149.5	121.1	129.9	126.5	126.2	1,703.4
Source: Japan Meteorological Agency (1991–2020 normals, extremes 1976–present)

== Demographics ==
Per Japanese census data, the population of Nihonmatsu peaked around 1950 and has since declined to pre-1920s levels.

Historical population
Year	Pop.	±%
1920	59,895	—
1930	63,929	+6.7%
1940	64,775	+1.3%
1950	79,215	+22.3%
1960	75,634	−4.5%
1970	68,117	−9.9%
1980	66,709	−2.1%
1990	66,988	+0.4%
2000	66,077	−1.4%
2010	59,871	−9.4%
2020	53,557	−10.5%

== History ==
The area of present-day Nihonmatsu was part of ancient Mutsu Province. It developed as post station on the Ōshū Kaidō highway and as the castle town of Nihonmatsu Domain, a 100,700 koku han, which was ruled by the Niwa clan under the Tokugawa shogunate) in the Edo period. After the Meiji Restoration, it was organized as part of Adachi District in the Nakadōri region of Iwaki Province.

The town of Nihonmatsu was established with the creation of the modern municipalities system on April 1, 1889. Nihonmatsu annexed the neighboring villages of Shiozawa, Dakeshita, Sugita, Ishii and Ohdaira on January 1, 1955 and was elevated to city status on October 1, 1958. The city annexed the towns of Adachi, Iwashiro and Tōwa (all from Adach District) on December 1, 2005.

== Government ==
Nihonmatsu has a mayor-council form of government with a directly elected mayor and a unicameral city legislature of 26 members. Nihonmatsu contributes two members to the Fukushima Prefectural Assembly. In terms of national politics, the city is part of Fukushima 2nd district of the lower house of the Diet of Japan.

== Economy ==
Nihonmatsu is a regional commercial center with a mixed economy. It is especially noted for furniture manufacturing and sake brewing.

== Education ==
Nihonmatsu has 16 public elementary schools and seven public junior high school operated by the city government, and three public high schools operated by the Fukushima Board of Education.

- Fukushima Prefectural Adachi High School
- Fukushima Prefectural Adachi Higashi High School
- Fukushima Prefectural Nihonmatsu Industrial High School

== Transportation ==
=== Railway ===
- JR East - Tōhoku Main Line
  - Sugita - Nihonmatsu - Adachi

=== Highway ===
- Tōhoku Expressway – Nihonmatsu Interchange
- National Route 4
- National Route 349
- National Route 459

== International relations ==
- Hanover, New Hampshire, United States, since July 30, 1999
- Jingshan County, Hubei Province, China, friendship city since October 16, 1994

== Local attractions ==
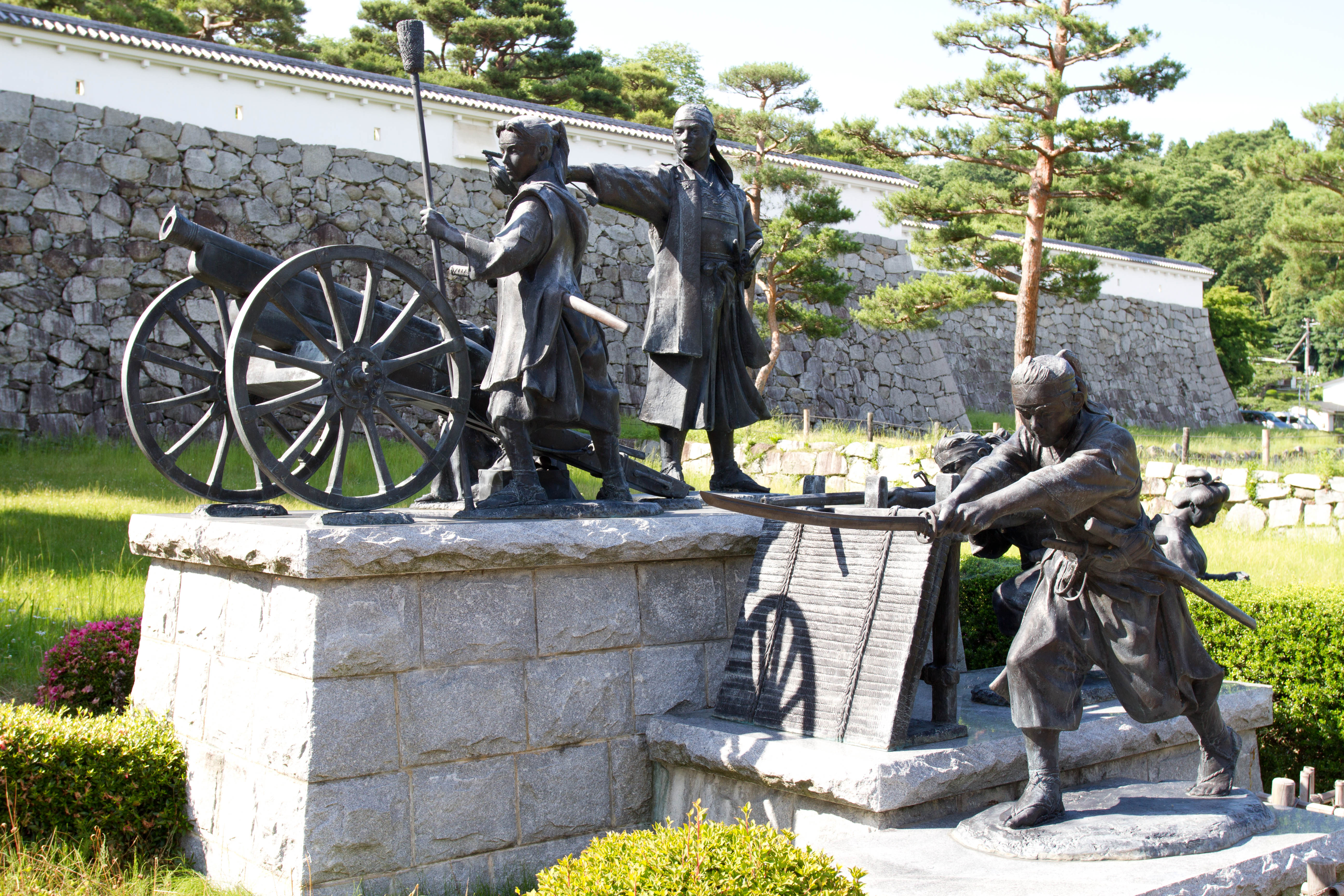
Monument of Nihonmatsu Boys Manifestation

=== Tourist spot ===
- Chieko Memorial Museum, the home of Chieko Takamura preserved as a museum
- Dake Onsen, onsen resort located in western Nihonmatsu
- Ebisu Circuit, famous drift racing track, adjacent to Tohoku Safari Park
- Nihonmatsu Castle, also known as Kasumiga Castle, is a historical castle along with a park. Nihonmatsu Castle is one of Japan's Top 100 Castles. Nihonmatsu Castle has also been called one of the top 100 sites in Japan for cherry blossom viewing by Wikivoyage.
- The Nihonmatsu Lantern Festival is held every October 4–6. The festival has been held annually since 1643 and is one of the three largest lantern festivals in Japan.
- Obama Castle, historical castle ruins

=== Sake ===
Nihonmatsu has a long history of sake brewing, with several sake breweries headquartered in the city:

- Daishichi, established in 1752, one of the few breweries that continues to use the traditional kimoto brewing process. Tours are available.
- Himonoya, maker of the Senkonari brand sake.
- Ninki Sake Brewery, established in 1897.
- Okunomatsu, established in 1716.

== Notable people from Nihonmatsu ==
- Kan'ichi Asakawa, academic
- Michiro Endo, musician, political activist
- Yuki Takamiya, long-distance runner
- Chieko Takamura, artist
