= Tomohisa =

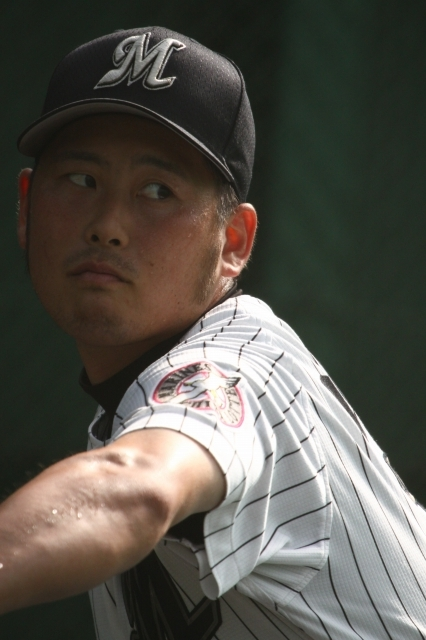
- Tomohisa Otani, Japanese baseball player
- Pronunciation: tomoçisa (IPA)
- Gender: Male

Origin
- Origin: Japanese
- Meaning: Different meanings depending on the kanji used

Tomohisa is a masculine Japanese given name.

== Written forms ==
Tomohisa can be written using different combinations of kanji characters. Some examples:

- 友久, "friend, long time"
- 友尚, "friend, still"
- 友寿, "friend, long life"
- 友悠, "friend, calm/distant"
- 知久, "know, long time"
- 知尚, "know, still"
- 知寿, "know, long life"
- 知悠, "know, calm/distant"
- 智久, "intellect, long time"
- 智尚, "intellect, still"
- 智寿, "intellect, long life"
- 智悠, "intellect, calm/distant"
- 共久, "together, long time"
- 共尚, "together, still"
- 朋久, "companion, humanity"
- 朋尚, "companion, still"
- 朝久, "morning/dynasty, long time"
- 朝尚, "morning/dynasty, still"
- 朝寿, "morning/dynasty, long life"
- 朝悠, "morning/dynasty, calm/distant"

The name can also be written in hiragana ともひさ or katakana トモヒサ.

== Notable people with the name ==
- Tomohisa Nemoto (根本 朋久; born 1986), Japanese baseball player
- Tomohisa Otani (大谷 智久; born 1985), Japanese baseball player
- Tomohisa Yamashita (山下 智久; born 1985), Japanese idol, actor and singer
- Tomohisa Yuge (弓削 智久; born 1980), Japanese actor

== See also ==
- 9100 Tomohisa, a main-belt asteroid
