= Obama Castle =

Obama Castle (小浜城, Obama-jō) may refer to:

- Obama Castle (Wakasa Province), the castle from which the Obama Domain was governed
- Obama Castle (Mutsu Province), a mountain castle in Fukishima Prefecture, Japan

== See also ==
- White House, official residence and workplace of the President of the United States
