= Shirasawa =

Shirasawa may refer to:

- Rikuzen-Shirasawa Station, JR East railway station located in Sendai, Miyagi Prefecture, Japan
- Shirasawa, Fukushima, village located in Adachi District, Fukushima, Japan
- Shirasawa, Gunma, village located in Tone District, Gunma, Japan
- Shirasawa Junior High School in Shiraiwa, Motomiya, Fukushima, Japan
- Shirasawa Keikoku Station, guided bus station in Moriyama-ku, Nagoya, Aichi Prefecture, Japan
- Shirasawa Station (Akita), railway station on the JR East Ōu Main Line in Ōdate, Akita, Japan
- Yasuyoshi Shirasawa (1868–1947), Japanese botanist at the University of Tokyo
