= Sugita Station =

Sugita Station (杉田駅) is the name of multiple train stations in Japan.

- Sugita Station (Fukushima) - in Fukushima Prefecture
- Sugita Station (Kanagawa) - in Kanagawa Prefecture
