= Arakawa River (Fukushima) =

Arakawa
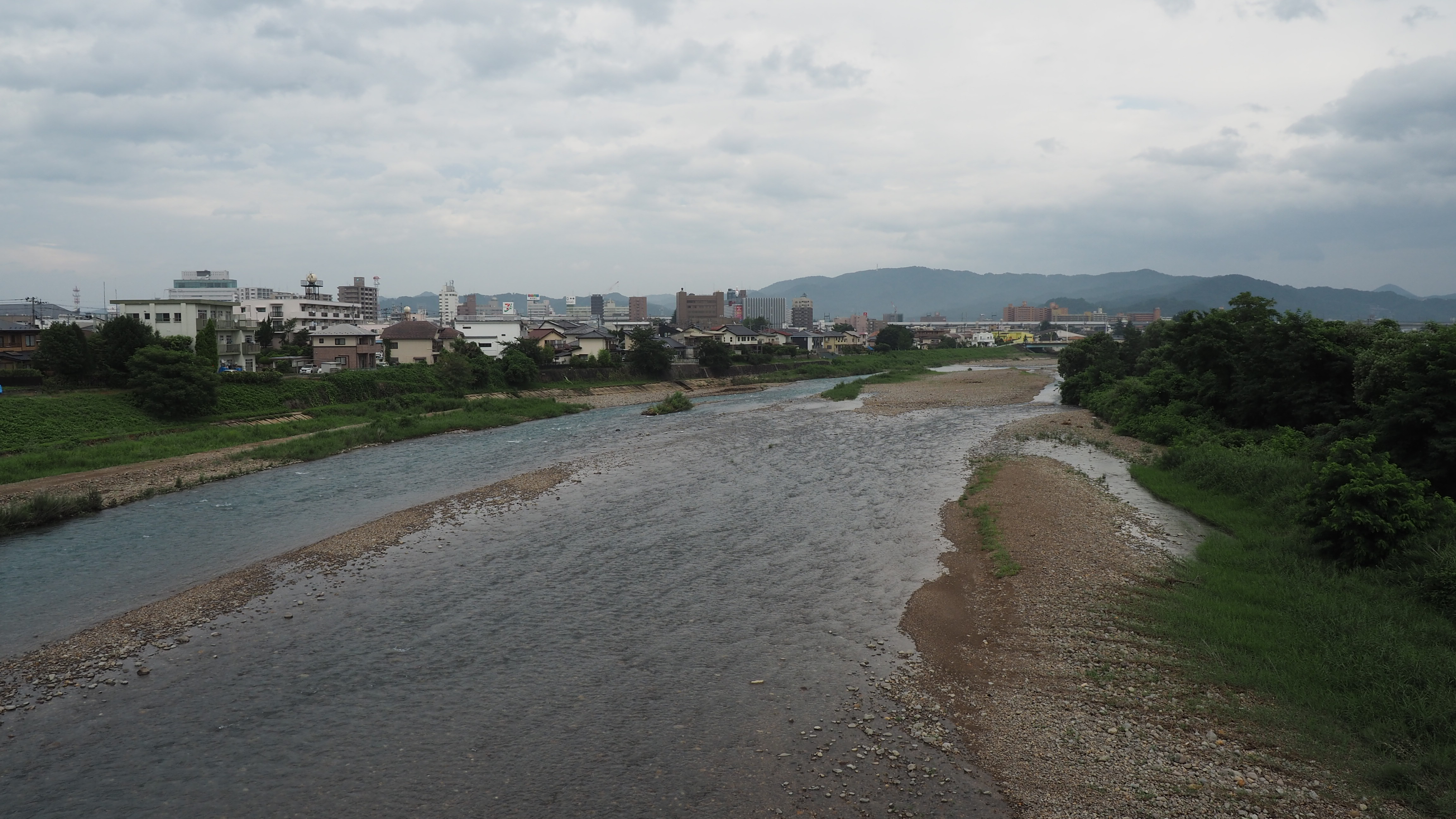
- Looking southeast over the Arakawa River in Fukushima City. Fukushima Station is visible in the distance.

- Location of mouth
- Native name: 荒川 (Japanese)

Location
- Country: Japan
- Prefecture: Fukushima
- Region: Nakadōri
- City: Fukushima

Physical characteristics
- Source: Mt. Higashi-Azuma
  - elevation: 1,974.7 m (6,479 ft)
- Source confluence: Abukuma River
  - location: Fukushima City
  - coordinates: 37.74498°N 140.46563°E
- Length: 29.7 km (18.5 mi)
- Basin size: 185.4 km^{2} (71.6 sq mi)

The Arakawa River (荒川, Arakawa) is a river in Fukushima, Fukushima, Japan.

== Geography ==
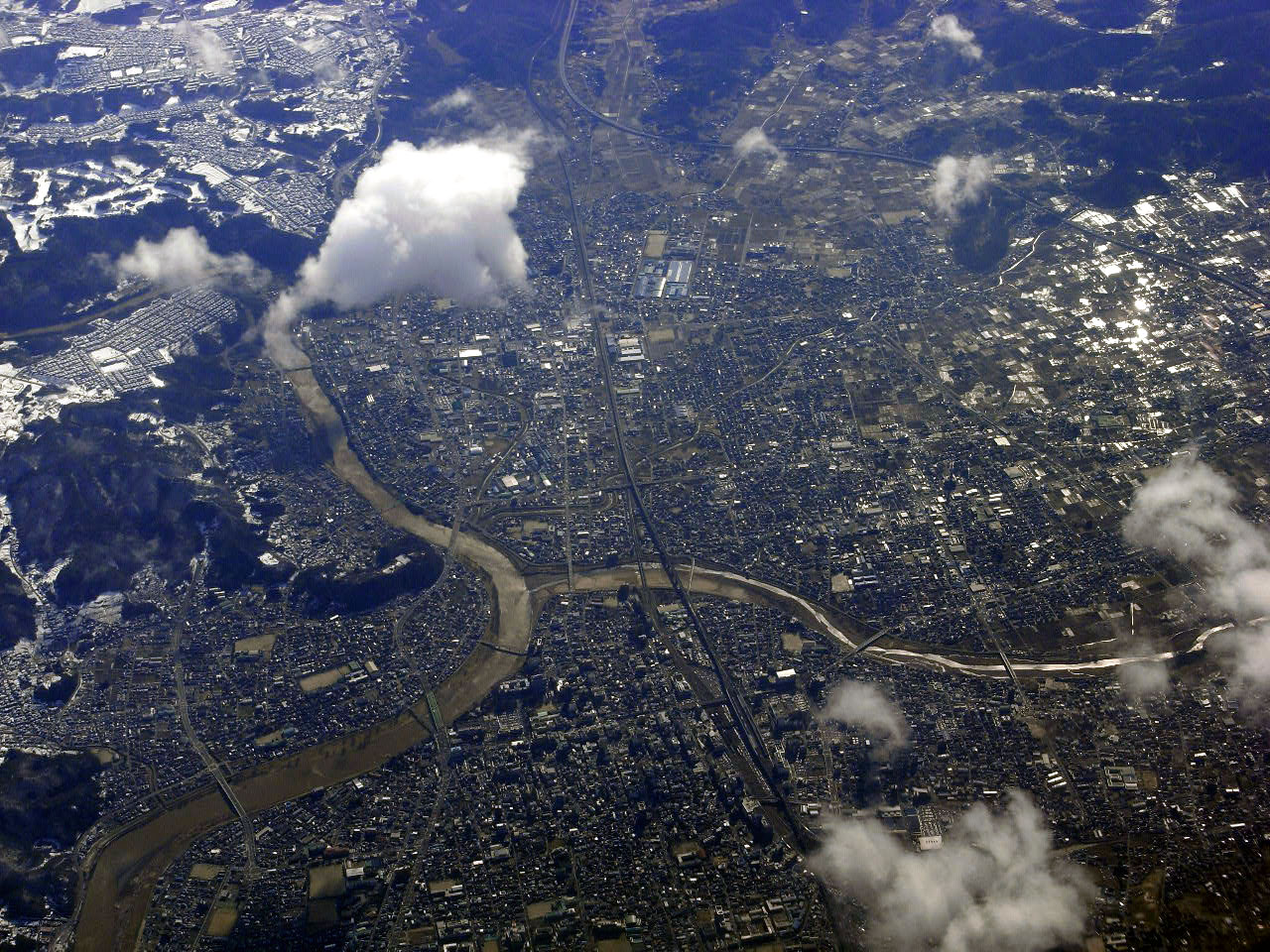
The confluence of the Arakawa River (right) and the Abukuma River (left)

The Arakawa River originates from the Azuma Mountain Range and flows eastward into the western part of the Fukushima Basin, joining with other smaller rivers from Mt. Issaikyō, Mt. Higashi-Azuma, and Mt. Tetsu along the way. It eventually terminates into the Abukuma River in the Ogura area of Fukushima City.

There are many recreational facilities that line the coast of the Arakawa River as it flows through Fukushima City, including the Mizubayashi Recreational Woods, Sakura Zutsumi Riverside Park, and the Arakawa Exercise Park, among other recreational and park areas.

== Flood Control ==
The name Arakawa comes from the river long being known as an abaregawa (暴れ川), meaning a river that floods often. Due these floodings, the Arakawa River has changed its course multiple times. The Ōmori River, now a tributary of the Arakawa River, currently flows in the former main riverbed of the Arakawa River.

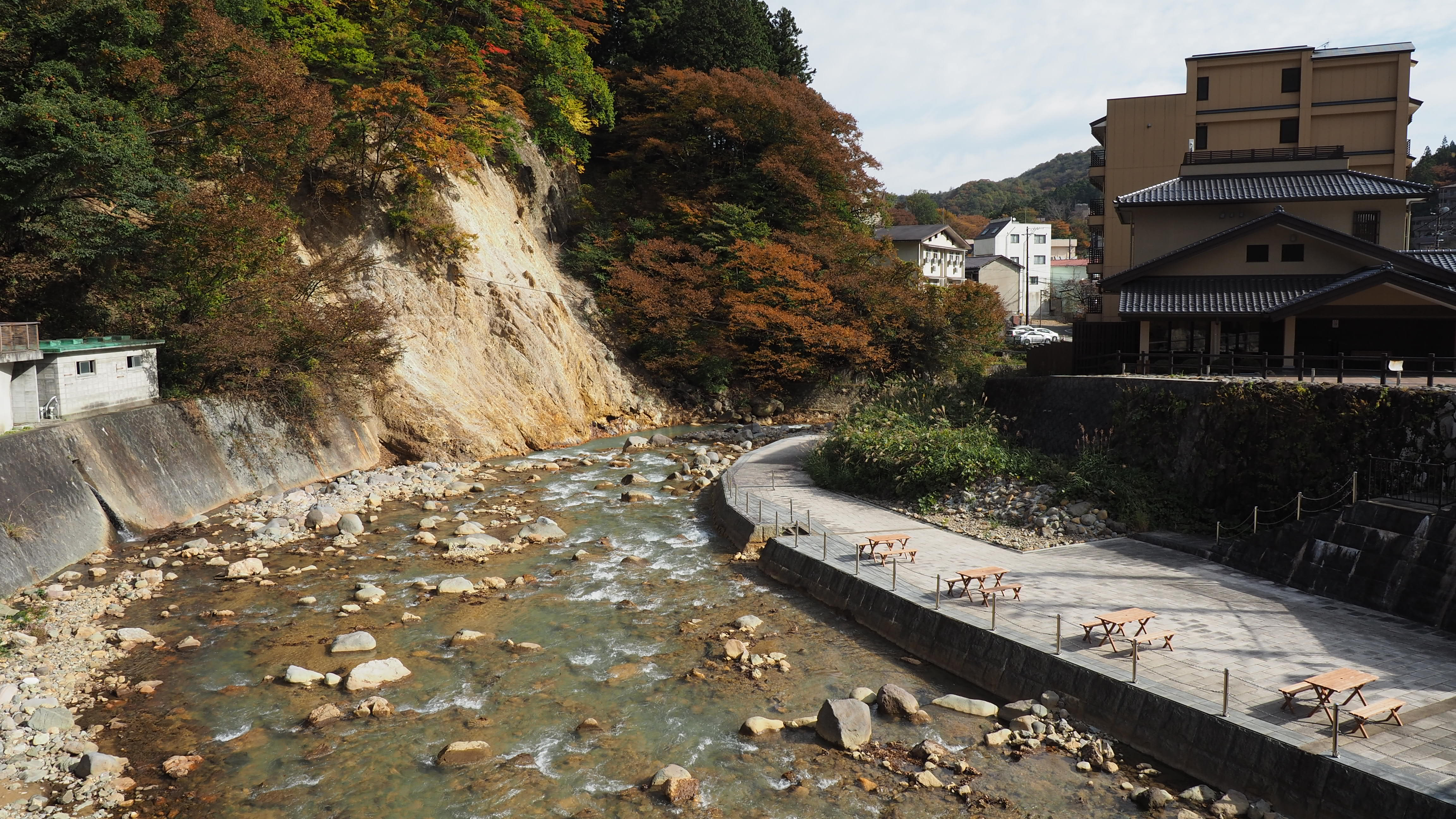
The Arakawa River as it flows through Tsuchiyu Onsen

The Arakawa River's steep descent in the Tsuchiyu Onsen area formerly caused multiple earth and rock slides. To prevent further damage, in 1900 Fukushima Prefecture began flood control construction on the river, and in 1936 the country took over and began construction of the Arakawa First Check Dam (荒川第一砂防堰堤, Arakawa Daiichi Sabō Entei). The construction proved ineffective, and the river continued to periodically flood, culminating in a large-scale flood on August 5, 1986.

In 2004 the Arakawa River's flood control system was completely overhauled, and 13 new check dams were built along the main river and numerous other dams built on its tributaries.

In 2008 the Agency for Cultural Affairs designated the Arakawa First Check Dam as a Registered Tangible Cultural Property.

== Water Quality ==
In 2007 the Arakawa River tied with six other rivers for having the best quality river water in country based on biochemical oxygen demand tests conducted by the Ministry of Land, Infrastructure, Transport and Tourism. For four years in a row, from 2004 to 2007, the Arakawa River ranked first in water quality among rivers in the Tōhoku region.
