= Tsuchiyu Onsen =

Hot spring resort in Fukushima Prefecture, Japan

Tsuchiyu Onsen 土湯温泉
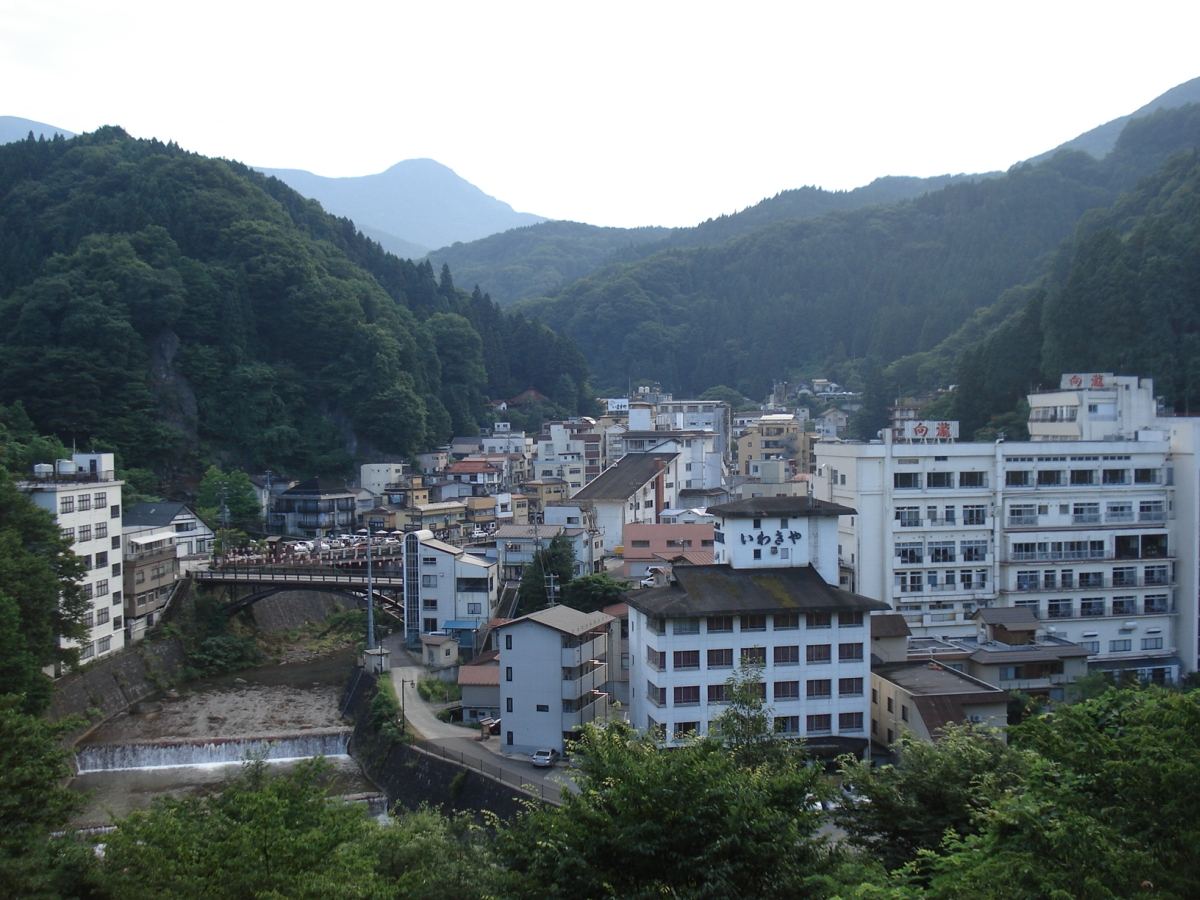
- View of Tsuchiyu Onsen

- Location within Fukushima Prefecture Location within Japan
- Interactive map of Tsuchiyu Onsen 土湯温泉
- Location: Fukushima, Fukushima, Japan
- Coordinates: 37.682°N 140.326°E
- Type: sulfuric, carbonated

Tsuchiyu Onsen (土湯温泉, Tsuchiyu-onsen) is a hot spring resort located approximately 16 kilometers west of the city centre of Fukushima, Fukushima, Japan. It is near the source and built along the shores of the Arakawa River, at the foot of Mt. Azuma.

== Water ==
The majority of Tsuchiyu's hot spring water comes out of the ground as steam at approximately 150 °C then is then piped two kilometers to Tsuchiyu's hotels. The water is largely colorless and clear, has faint traces of sulfur, and has a pH of 6.5. Some hotels receive their water from a separate source, leading to some hotels using water containing sodium bicarbonate or higher levels of sulfur.

== Facilities ==
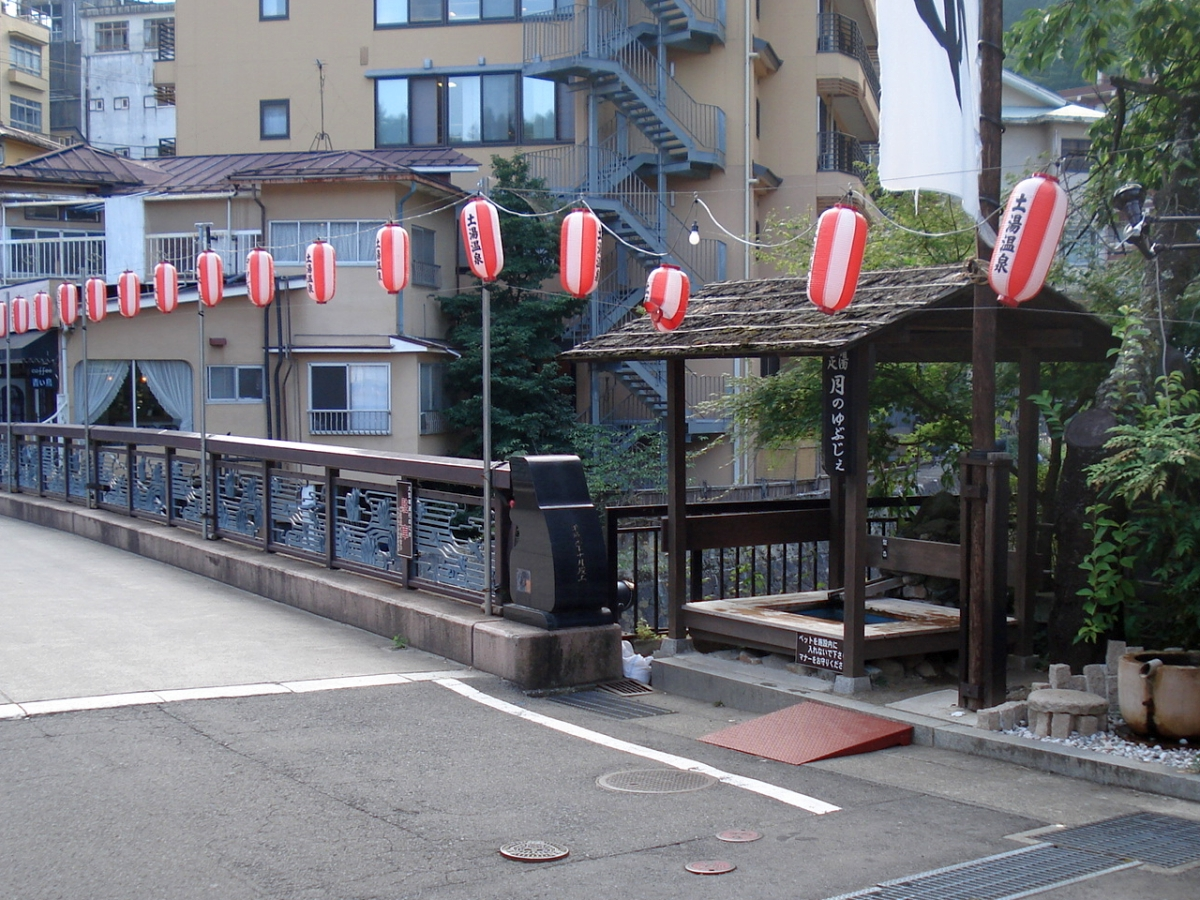
A free ashiyu foot bath in Tsuchiyu

There are multiple ryokan and hotels in the area for guests to stay the night, along with four free ashiyu foot baths placed throughout the area.

== Kokeshi dolls ==
In the mid-19th century artisans in Tsuchiyu began producing wooden kokeshi dolls unique to the area. As Tsuchiyu lies at the mountains foot of Mt. Azuma, in the mid-19th century the route to Tsuchiyu was impassible for around four months a year due to heavy snow. Local craftsmen began to produce kokeshi dolls as a way to make extra money to make up for the lack of guests during these slow periods.

Tsuchiyu kokeshi are distinguishable from other kokeshi due to have a smaller head, two black concentric circles on the top of the head, a small mouth, a rounded nose, a red ribbon painted on the hair, a thin body, and colored strips painted on the body using a potter's wheel.
