= Iwashiro, Fukushima =

Dissolved municipality in Fukushima prefecture, Japan

Coordinates: 33°47′N 135°17′E

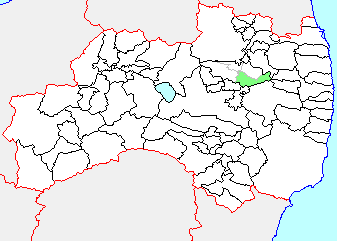
Map of Iwashiro, Fukushima

Iwashiro (岩代町, Iwashiro-machi) was a town located in Adachi District, Fukushima Prefecture, Japan.

On December 1, 2005, Iwashiro, along with the towns of Adachi and Tōwa (all from Adachi District), was merged into the expanded city of Nihonmatsu.

As of 2003, the town had an estimated population of 9,002 and a density of 91.51 persons per km^{2}. The total area was 98.37 km^{2}. Obama Castle is located in Iwashiro.
