= Chieko Takamura =

Japanese artist (1886–1938)

- 高村 智恵子
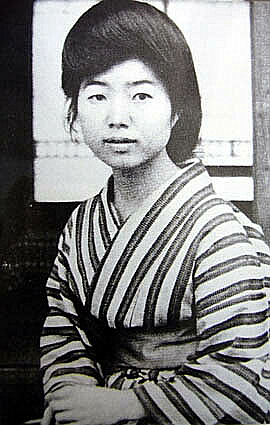
- Born: Naganuma Chieko; May 20, 1886; Adachi (Nihonmatsu), Fukushima Prefecture, Japan
- Died: October 5, 1938 (aged 52)
- Occupation: Artist
- Spouse: Kōtarō Takamura

Chieko Takamura (高村 智恵子, Takamura Chieko; May 20, 1886 – October 5, 1938) was a Japanese artist and feminist. She is known for creating the cover illustration for the first issue of Seitō, an early Japanese feminist magazine, and as the inspiration for her husband's collection of poems, Chieko-shō.

== Early life and education ==
Chieko Takamura was born in the town of Adachi in what is now the city of Nihonmatsu, Fukushima Prefecture as Chieko Naganuma, the eldest of six daughters and two sons born to parents Kesakichi and Sen Naganuma. In 1903, she went to the Japan Women's University in Tokyo, and graduated in 1907. At college she played tennis with a fellow student, Hiratsuka Raichō, who became a feminist writer.

== Career ==
She became an oil painter, and made colorful cut-paper collages. She was an early member of the Japanese feminist movement Seitōsha, joining in 1911. She made the cover illustration for the first issue of their magazine, Seitō (Bluestocking), which was co-founded by her college friend Hiratsuka Raichō. It began as a literary outlet for woman writers and quickly turned into a forum for discussing feminist issues. These women were from the upper-middle class and soon were labeled "New Women" because of their views and their lifestyles.

== Personal life and legacy ==
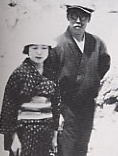
Chieko and Kōtarō

In February 1914, she married Kōtarō Takamura, a sculptor and poet, whom she met soon after he had returned from France.

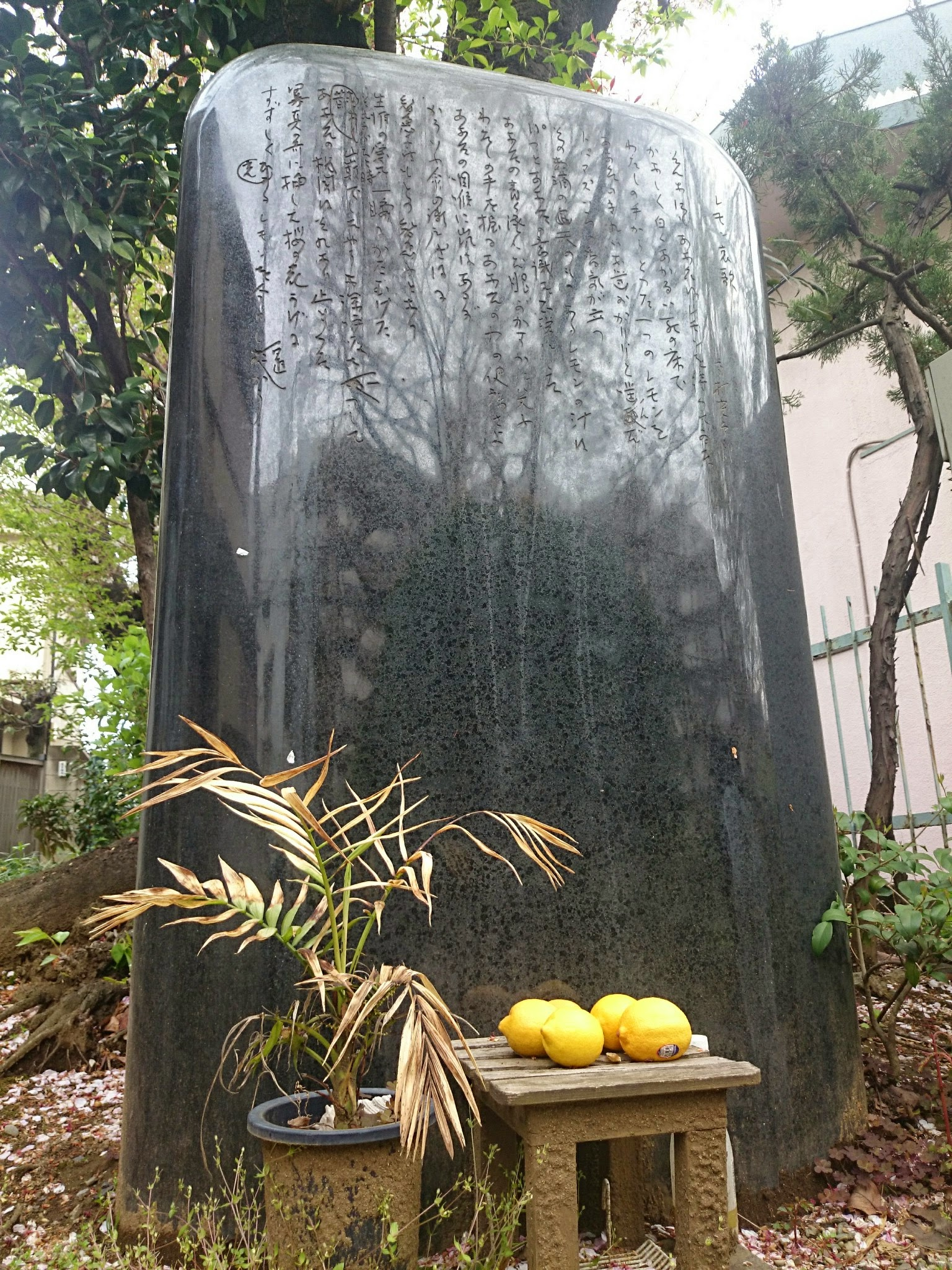
Chieko's memorial monument "Lemon elegy cenotaph" at her death place in Shinagawa, Tokyo

Following the breakup of her family home in 1929, she was diagnosed in 1931 with symptoms of schizophrenia – she was hospitalized for that disease in 1935, and remained institutionalized until her death from tuberculosis in 1938.

Kōtarō's book of poems about her, Chieko's Sky (智恵子抄, Chieko-shō; literally "Selections of Chieko"), is still widely read, translated, and analyzed today. The translated title, "Chieko's Sky", is from one of the poems, "Childlike story" (あどけない話, Adokenai hanashi), where Chieko longs for the sky of her childhood.

== See also ==
- Portrait of Chieko
