= Tōwa, Fukushima =

Dissolved municipality in Fukushima prefecture, Japan

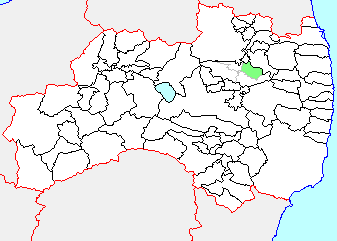
Map of Towa, Fukushima

Tōwa (東和町, Tōwa-machi) was a town located in Adachi District, Fukushima Prefecture, Japan.

On December 1, 2005, Tōwa, along with the towns of Adachi and Iwashiro (all from Adachi District), was merged into the expanded city of Nihonmatsu.

As of 2003, the town had an estimated population of 8,041 and a density of 111.34 persons per km^{2}. The total area was 72.22 km^{2}.
