= Nihonmatsu Station =

Railway station in Nihonmatsu, Fukushima Prefecture, Japan

Nihonmatsu Station 二本松駅
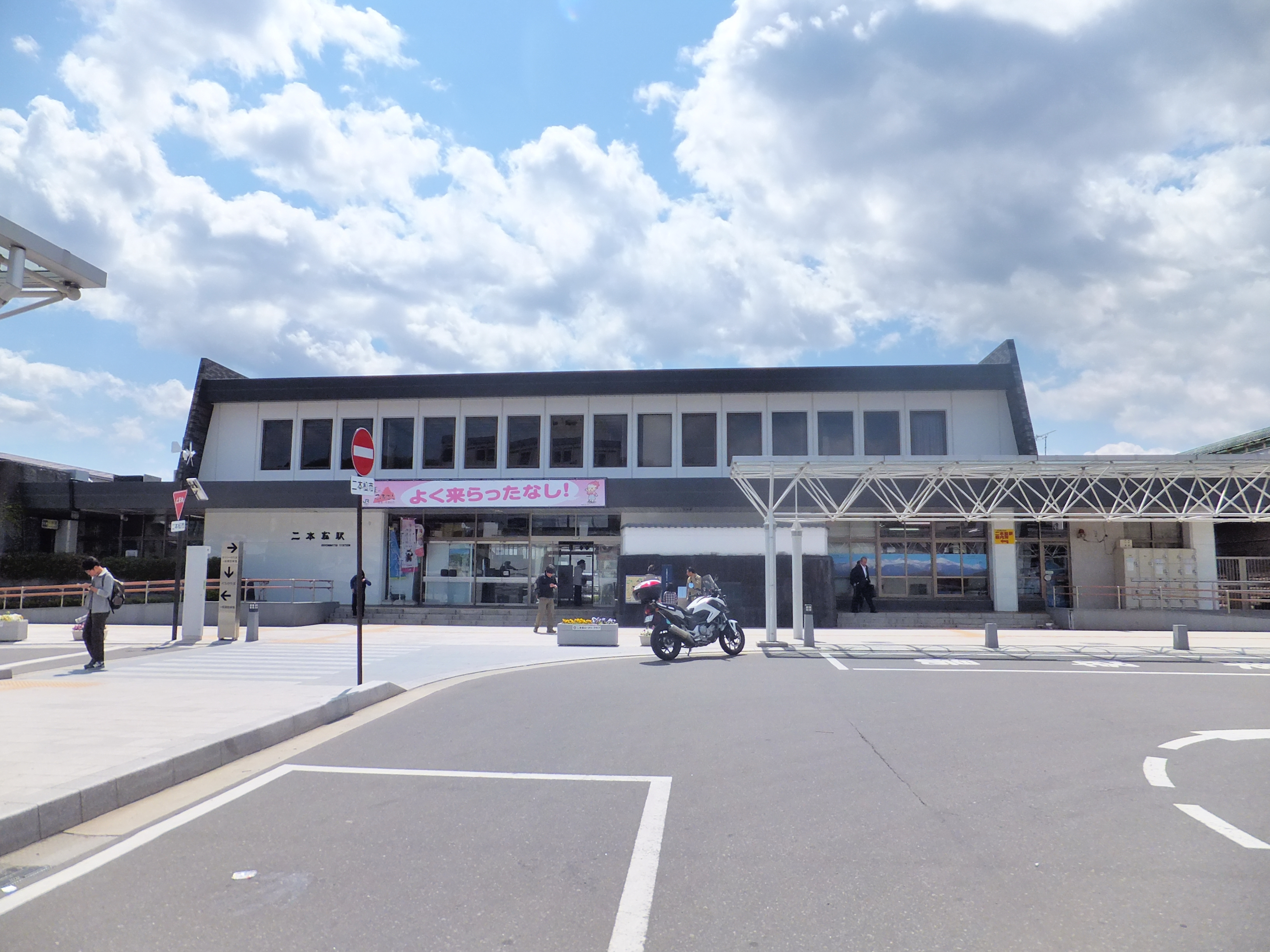
- Nihonmatsu Station in May 2013

General information
- Location: 2-262 Motomachi, Nihonmatsu-shi, Fukushima-ken 964-0917; Japan
- Coordinates: 37.5894°N 140.4353°E
- Operator: JR East
- Line: ■ Tōhoku Main Line
- Distance: 250.3 km from Tokyo
- Platforms: 2 side platforms
- Tracks: 2

Other information
- Status: Staffed ("Midori no Madoguchi")
- Website: Official website

History
- Opened: December 15, 1887

Passengers
- FY2018: 1762 (daily)

Services
Preceding station	JR East	Following station
Sugita towards Kuroiso	Tōhoku Main Line Local	Adachi towards Morioka
Location
- Location within Fukushima Prefecture Location within Japan

Nihonmatsu Station (二本松駅, Nihonmatsu-eki) is a railway station in the city of Nihonmatsu, Fukushima, Japan, operated by East Japan Railway Company (JR East).

== Lines ==
Nihonmatsu Station is served by the Tōhoku Main Line, and is located 250.3 km from the official starting point of the line at Tokyo.

== Station layout ==
The station has two opposed side platforms connected to the station building by a footbridge. The station has a "Midori no Madoguchi" staffed ticket office.

=== Platforms ===
1	■ Tōhoku Main Line	for Fukushima and Sendai
2	■ Tōhoku Main Line	for Kōriyama and Kuroiso

== History ==
Nihonmatsu Station opened on December 15, 1887. The present station building was completed in September 1976. The station was absorbed into the JR East network upon the privatization of the Japanese National Railways (JNR) on April 1, 1987.

== Passenger statistics ==
In fiscal 2018, the station was used by an average of 1,762 passengers daily (boarding passengers only).

== Surrounding area ==
- National Route 4

== See also ==
- List of railway stations in Japan
