= Adachi Station =

Railway station in Nihonmatsu, Fukushima Prefecture, Japan

Adachi Station 安達駅
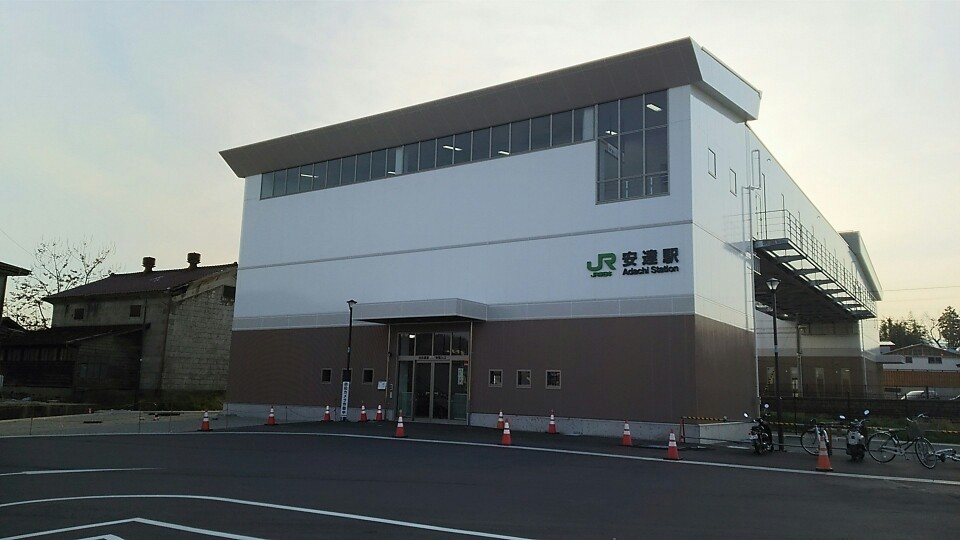
- Adachi Station in April 2016

General information
- Location: 5 Aburai Furuyashiki, Nihonmatsu-shi, Fukushima-ken 969-1404; Japan
- Coordinates: 37.6117°N 140.4658°E
- Operator: JR East
- Line: ■ Tōhoku Main Line
- Distance: 254.5 km from Tokyo
- Platforms: 2 side platforms
- Tracks: 2

Other information
- Status: Staffed
- Website: Official website

History
- Opened: 11 July 1917

Passengers
- FY2016: 818 daily

Services
Preceding station	JR East	Following station
Nihonmatsu towards Kuroiso	Tōhoku Main Line Local	Matsukawa towards Morioka
Location
- Location within Fukushima Prefecture Location within Japan

Adachi Station (安達駅, Adachi-eki) is a railway station in the city of Nihonmatsu, Fukushima Prefecture, Japan operated by East Japan Railway Company (JR East).

== Lines ==
Adachi Station is served by the Tōhoku Main Line, and is located 254.5 kilometers from the official starting point of the line at Tokyo.

== Station layout ==
The station has one island platform connected to the station building by a footbridge. The station is staffed.

=== Platforms ===
1	■ Tōhoku Main Line	for Fukushima
2	■ Tōhoku Main Line	for Kōriyama

== History ==
Adachi Station opened on July 11, 1917. The station was absorbed into the JR East network upon the privatization of the Japanese National Railways (JNR) on April 1, 1987.

== Passenger statistics ==
In fiscal 2018, the station was used by an average of 787 passengers daily (boarding passengers only).

== Surrounding area ==
- Adachi Post Office
- Adachi Chamber of Commerce
- former Adachi Town Hall
- National Route 4

== See also ==
- List of railway stations in Japan
