= Tadashi Takamura =

Japanese photographer

Tadashi Takamura (高村 規, Takamura Tadashi; May 15, 1933 – August 13, 2014) was a Japanese photographer from Tokyo. He was the grandson of Takamura Koun.

Takamura photographed fashion and architecture.
