= Tomohisa Nemoto =

Japanese baseball player

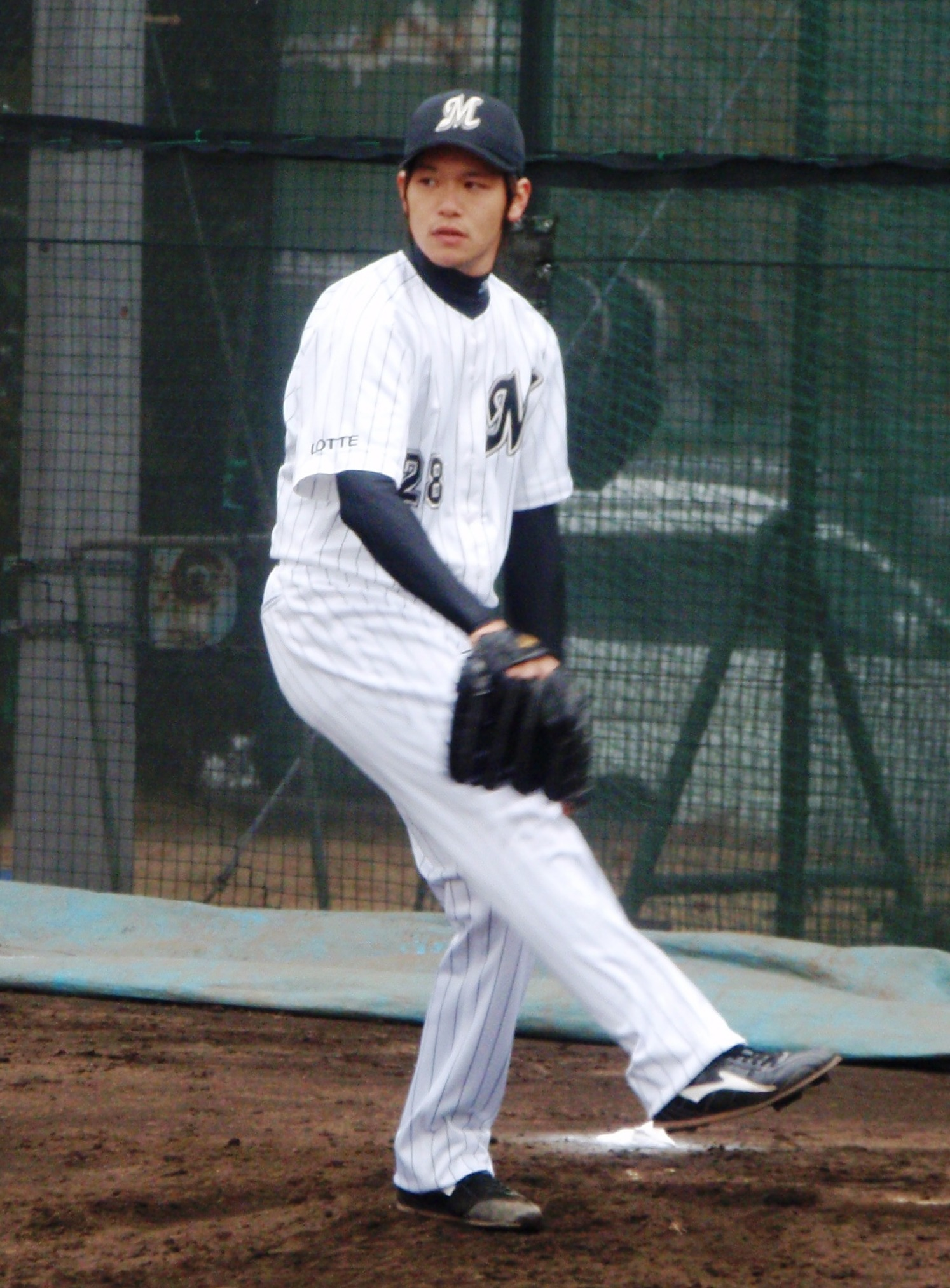
- Pitcher
- Born: March 21, 1986 (age 40); Motomiya, Fukushima, Japan
- Bats: Right Throws: Right

MLB debut
- 2008, for the Chiba Lotte Marines

NPB statistics (through 2013 season)
- WHIP: 1.385
- ERA: 4.15
- SO: 3
- Stats at Baseball Reference

Teams
- Chiba Lotte Marines (2008–2010); Hokkaido Nippon-Ham Fighters (2011–2014)

Tomohisa Nemoto (根本 朋久, Nemoto Tomohisa) is a Japanese professional baseball player. He was born on March 21, 1986, in Motomiya, Fukushima, Japan. He played two years for the Chiba Lotte Marines for three years, from 2008 to 2010, and from 2011 on, he has been playing for the Fighters.
