= Adachi, Fukushima =

Adachi 安達町
- Former municipality
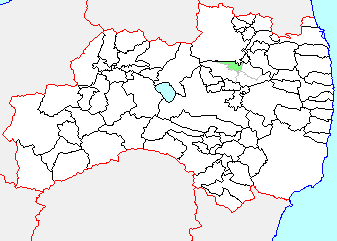
- Location of Adachi in Fukushima Prefecture

- Location in Japan
- Coordinates: 37°36′26.4″N 140°27′40.5″E
- Country: Japan
- Region: Tohoku Region
- Prefecture: Fukushima Prefecture
- District: Adachi District
- Merged: December 1, 2005 (now part of Nihonmatsu)

Area
  - Total: 44.35 km^{2} (17.12 sq mi)

Population (2003)
  - Total: 11,727
- Time zone: UTC+09:00 (JST)

Adachi (安達町, Adachi-machi) was a town located in Adachi District, Fukushima Prefecture, Japan.

On December 1, 2005, Adachi, along with the towns of Iwashiro and Tōwa (all from Adachi District), was merged into the expanded city of Nihonmatsu.

As of 2003, the town had an estimated population of 11,727 and a population density of 264.42 persons per km^{2}. The total area was 44.35 km^{2}.
