= Adachi District, Fukushima =

District in Fukushima Prefecture, Japan

Coordinates: 37.5447602°N 140.3378622°E

Location of Adachi District in Fukushima Prefecture

Adachi (安達郡, Adachi-gun) is a district located in Fukushima Prefecture, Tōhoku region, Japan. As of January 2007, the district has a population of 8,577 and an area of 79.46 km^{2}, for a population density of 107.9 per km^{2}. In older administrative divisions, it was located in the Iwashiro, Tōsandō.

== Towns and villages ==
- Ōtama

== History ==
- On December 1, 2005, the towns of Adachi, Iwashiro and Tōwa merged into the city of Nihonmatsu.
- On January 1, 2007, the village of Shirasawa and the town of Motomiya merged to form the city of Motomiya, leaving the district.

Prior to the merger, as of 2003, the district had an estimated population of 68,436 and a density of 178.99 persons per km^{2}. The total area was 382.34 km^{2}.
