= Abukuma River =

River in Tōhoku, Japan

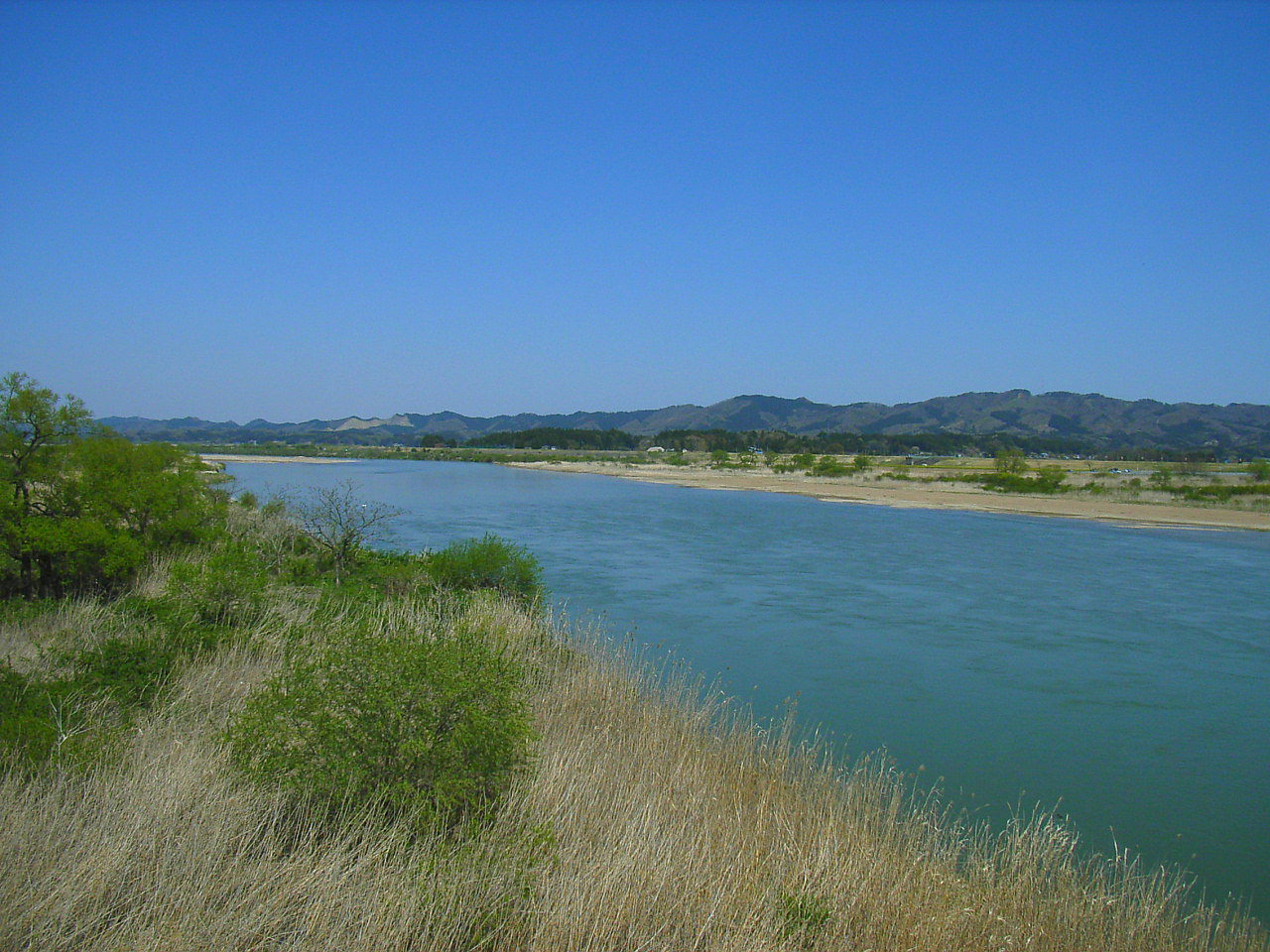
- The Abukuma River in 2005 at Kakuda in Miyagi

- Location within Japan
- Native name: 阿武隈川 (Japanese)

Location
- Country: Japan
- Prefectures: Miyagi, Fukushima
- Cities: Shirakawa, Sukagawa, Kōriyama, Motomiya, Nihonmatsu, Fukushima, Date, Kakuda, Iwanuma

Physical characteristics
- Source: Mt. Asahi (Fukushima Prefecture)
  - coordinates: 37.161°N 139.972°E
  - elevation: 1,835 m (6,020 ft)
- Mouth: Pacific Ocean
  - location: Iwanuma, Miyagi, Japan
  - coordinates: 38.0494°N 140.9190°E
- Length: 239 km (149 mi)
- Basin size: 5,390 km^{2} (2,080 sq mi)
- Discharge
  - average: 67.3 m^{3}/s (2,380 cu ft/s)

Basin features
- Population: 1,360,000
- Tributaries
  - left: Shakadō River, Sasahara River, Ōse River, Gohyaku River, Rokkaku River, Arakawa River, Matsu River, Surikami River, Shiroishi River
  - right: Ōtakine River, Hirose River

The Abukuma River (阿武隈川, Abukuma-gawa), with a length of 234 km (145 mi), is the second longest river in the Tōhoku region of Japan and the 6th longest river in the country. It is designated as a Class A river.

It runs through Fukushima Prefecture and Miyagi Prefecture, rising from springs in the peaks of the Nasu mountains, collecting water from tributaries leaving the Ōu Mountains and the Abukuma Highlands, then emptying into the Pacific Ocean as a major river. Its watershed has a 5,400 km^{2} (2,100 mi^{2}) area, and about 1.36 million people live in its basin.

The Abukuma River flows north through Fukushima Prefecture's Nakadōri region, past the cities of Shirakawa, Sukagawa, Kōriyama, Nihonmatsu, Date, and Fukushima. The portion of the river flowing between Nihonmatsu and Fukushima forms a deep ravine called Hōrai-kyō (蓬莱峡). Crossing the northern edge of the long but low Abukuma hills, the Abukuma River then flows into Miyagi Prefecture, past the city of Kakuda and between Iwanuma and Watari before reaching the Pacific. Abukuma has a tributary called the Arakawa River.
