= Sugita Station (Fukushima) =

Railway station in Nihonmatsu, Fukushima Prefecture, Japan

Sugita Station 杉田駅
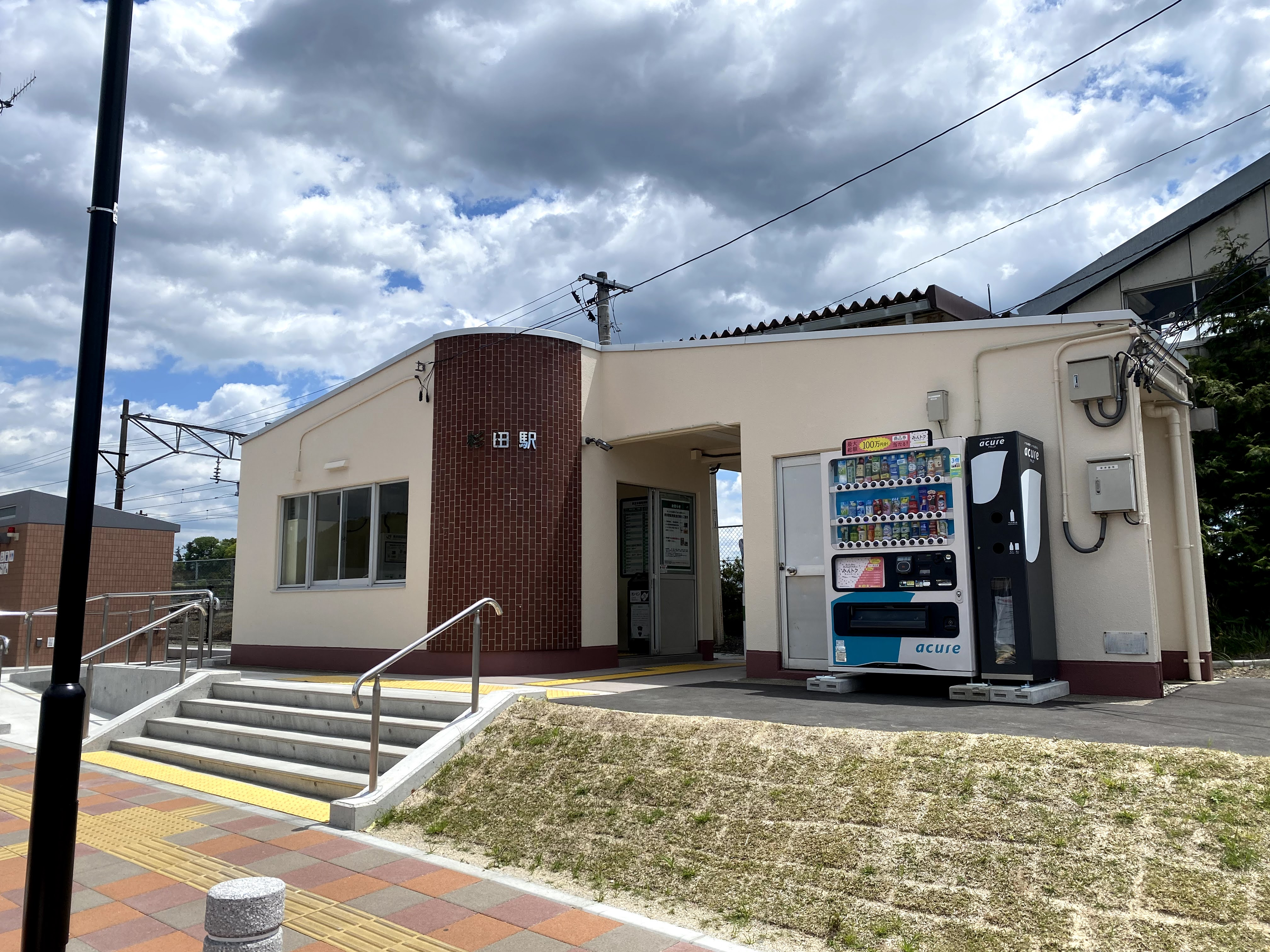
- Sugita Station in May 2021

General information
- Location: Sugita-cho 1-128, Nihonmatsu-shi, Fukushima-ken 964-0865; Japan
- Coordinates: 37°33′48″N 140°24′49″E
- Operator: JR East
- Line: ■ Tōhoku Main Line
- Distance: 246.6 km from Tokyo
- Platforms: 2 side platforms
- Tracks: 2

Other information
- Status: Unstaffed
- Website: Official website

History
- Opened: December 19, 1948

Passengers
- 2004: 452 daily

Services
| Preceding station | JR East | Following station |
|---|---|---|
| Motomiya towards Kuroiso | Tōhoku Main Line Local | Nihonmatsu towards Morioka |
Location
- Location within Fukushima Prefecture Location within Japan

Sugita Station (杉田駅, Sugita-eki) is a railway station in the city of Nihonmatsu, Fukushima Prefecture, Japan operated by East Japan Railway Company (JR East).

== Lines ==
Sugita Station is served by the Tōhoku Main Line, and is located 246.6 rail kilometers from the official starting point of the line at Tokyo.

== Station layout ==
The station has two opposed side platforms connected to the station building by a footbridge. The station is unattended.

=== Platforms ===
| 1 | ■ Tōhoku Main Line | for Fukushima |
| 2 | ■ Tōhoku Main Line | for Kōriyama |

== History ==
Sugita Station opened on December 19, 1948. The station was absorbed into the JR East network upon the privatization of the Japanese National Railways (JNR) on April 1, 1987.

== Surrounding area ==
- Sugita Post office
- National Route 4

== See also ==
- List of railway stations in Japan
