= Shirasawa, Fukushima =

Village in Adachi, Fukushima, Japan

Shirasawa (白沢村, Shirasawa-mura) was a village located in Adachi District, Fukushima Prefecture, Japan.

On January 1, 2007, Shirasawa was merged with the former town of Motomiya (also from Adachi District) to create the city of Motomiya.

== Demographics ==
As of 2003, the village had an estimated population of 9,388 as of September 2005 and a density of 191.24 persons per km^{2}. The total area was 48.40 km^{2}.

Shirasawa had an average of 4.36 members per household, which was the highest in Japan.

== History ==
Shirasawa was founded when the villages of Shiraiwa (白岩村;-mura) and Wagisawa (和木沢村;-mura) merged in April 1955.

== Education ==
Public Schools

(Shirasawa Village School District, now Motomiya City School District)

- Shirasawa Junior High School
- Nukazawa Elementary School
- Wada Elementary School
- Shiraiwa Elementary School

== Transportation ==
- Fukushima Route 28, Motomiya to Miharu
- Fukushima Route 40, Iino to Miharu Ishikawa
- Tohoku Shinkansen tracks run through, though there is no station
- ~5 km to National Route 4
- ~5 km to Tohoku JR East Motomiya Station
