= Mount Adatara =

Stratovolcano on the island of Honshu, Japan

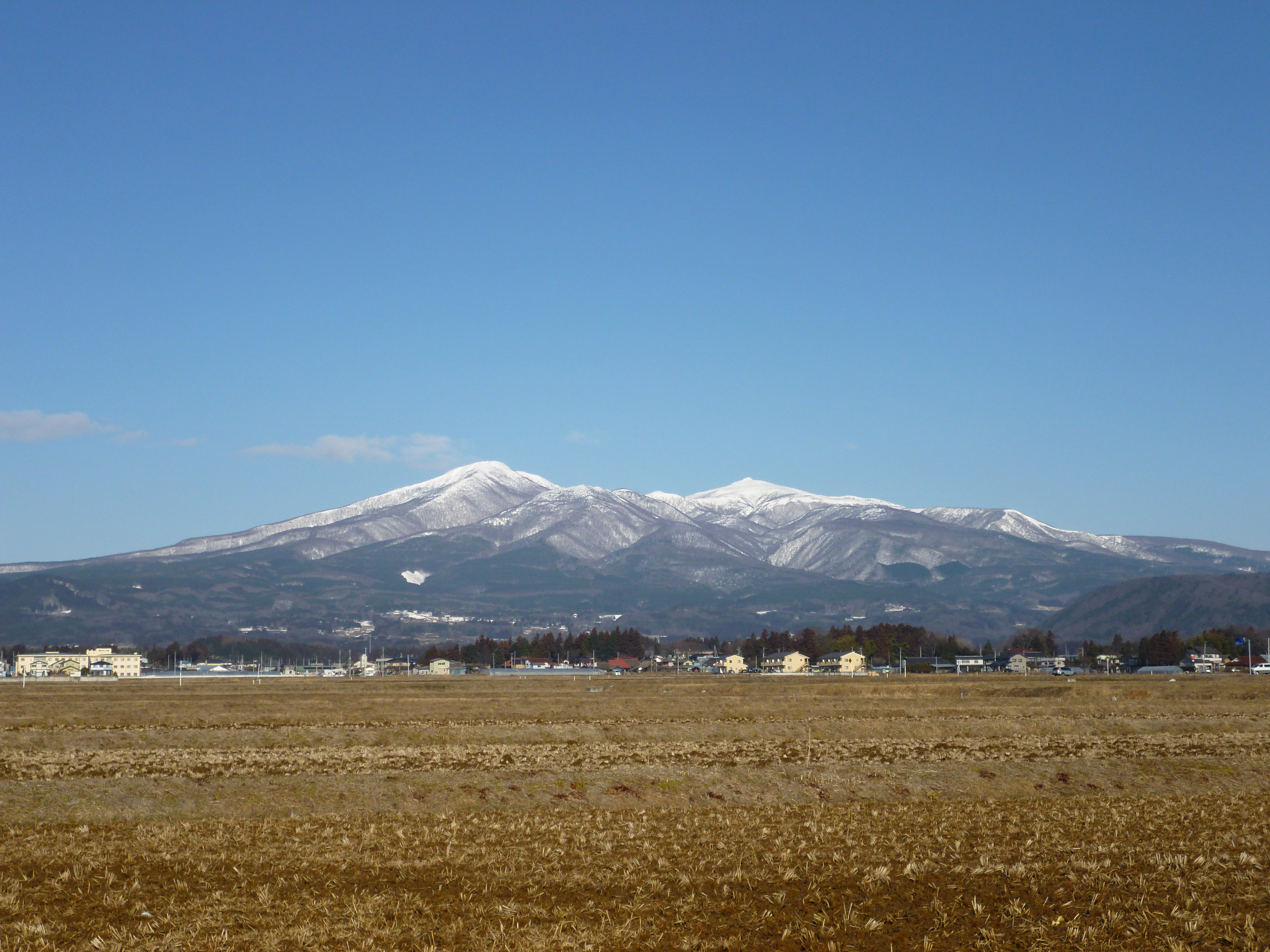
- Viewed from the SE.

Highest point
- Elevation: 1,728 m (5,669 ft)
- Listing: Volcanoes in Japan
- Coordinates: 37°38′39″N 140°17′10″E

Naming
- Native name: 安達太良山 (Japanese)

Geography
- Location within Fukushima Prefecture
- Location: Fukushima Prefecture, Honshu, Japan
- Parent range: Ōu Mountains

Geology
- Mountain type: Stratovolcano
- Volcanic arc: Northeastern Japan Arc
- Last eruption: AD 1900

Mount Adatara (安達太良山, Adatara-yama) is a stratovolcano in Fukushima Prefecture, Japan.

It is located about 15 kilometres southwest of the city of Fukushima and east of Mount Bandai. Its last known eruption was in 1996. An eruption in 1900 killed 72 workers at a sulfur mine located in the summit crater.

== History ==
The mountain is actually multiple volcanoes forming a broad, forested massif. It abuts Mount Azuma, a dormant volcano to the north. The peak is called Minowa-yama. It is the highest peak in the Adatara range, which stretches about 9 km in a north-south direction.

The active summit crater is surrounded by hot springs and fumaroles. Sulfur mining was carried out in the 19th century. An eruption in the crater in July 1900 killed 72 mine workers, injured another 10 and completely destroyed the sulfur mine. Poems about Mount Adatara by Kōtarō Takamura from his book "Chieko-sho" helped make it famous.

== Gallery ==
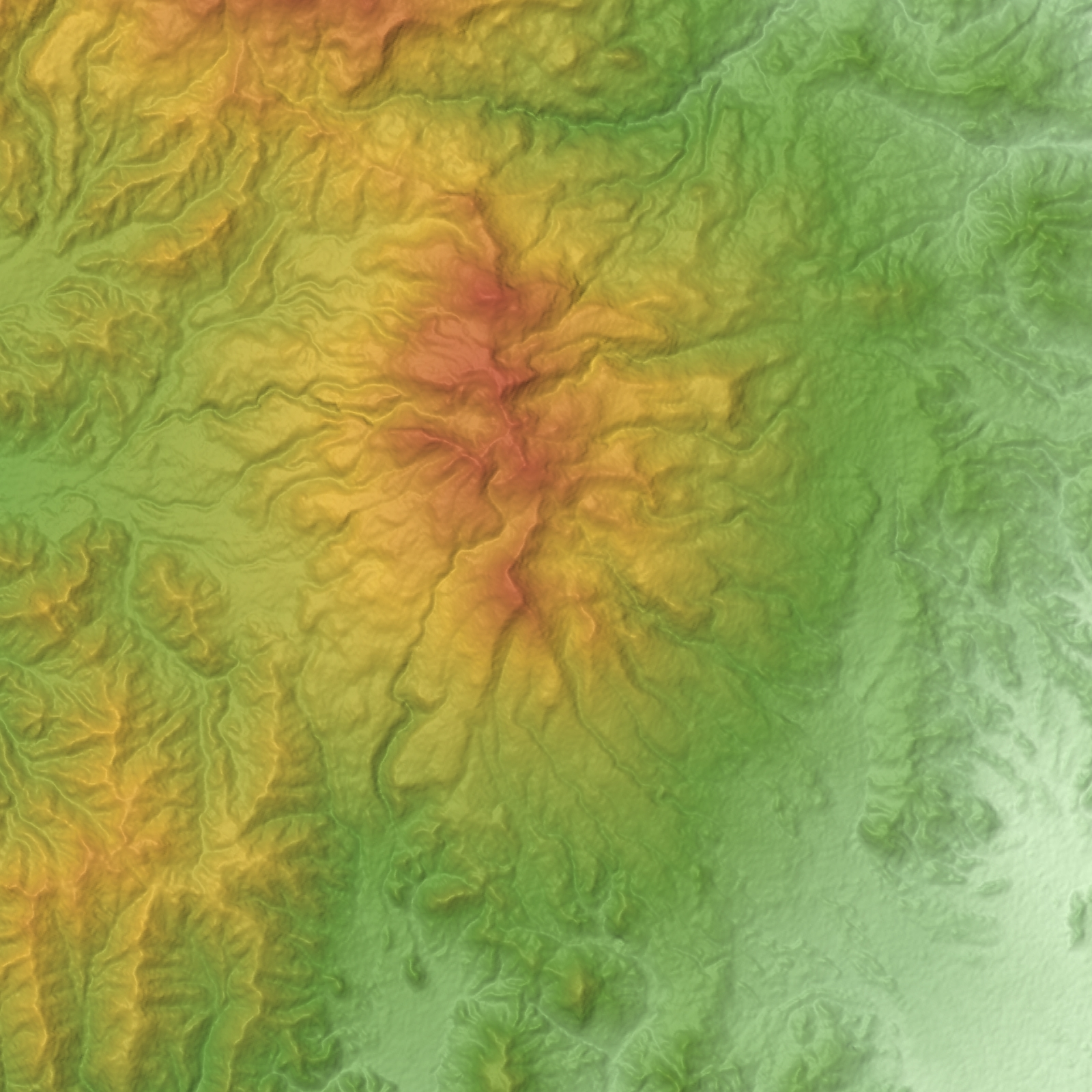
Massif of Adatara Volcano

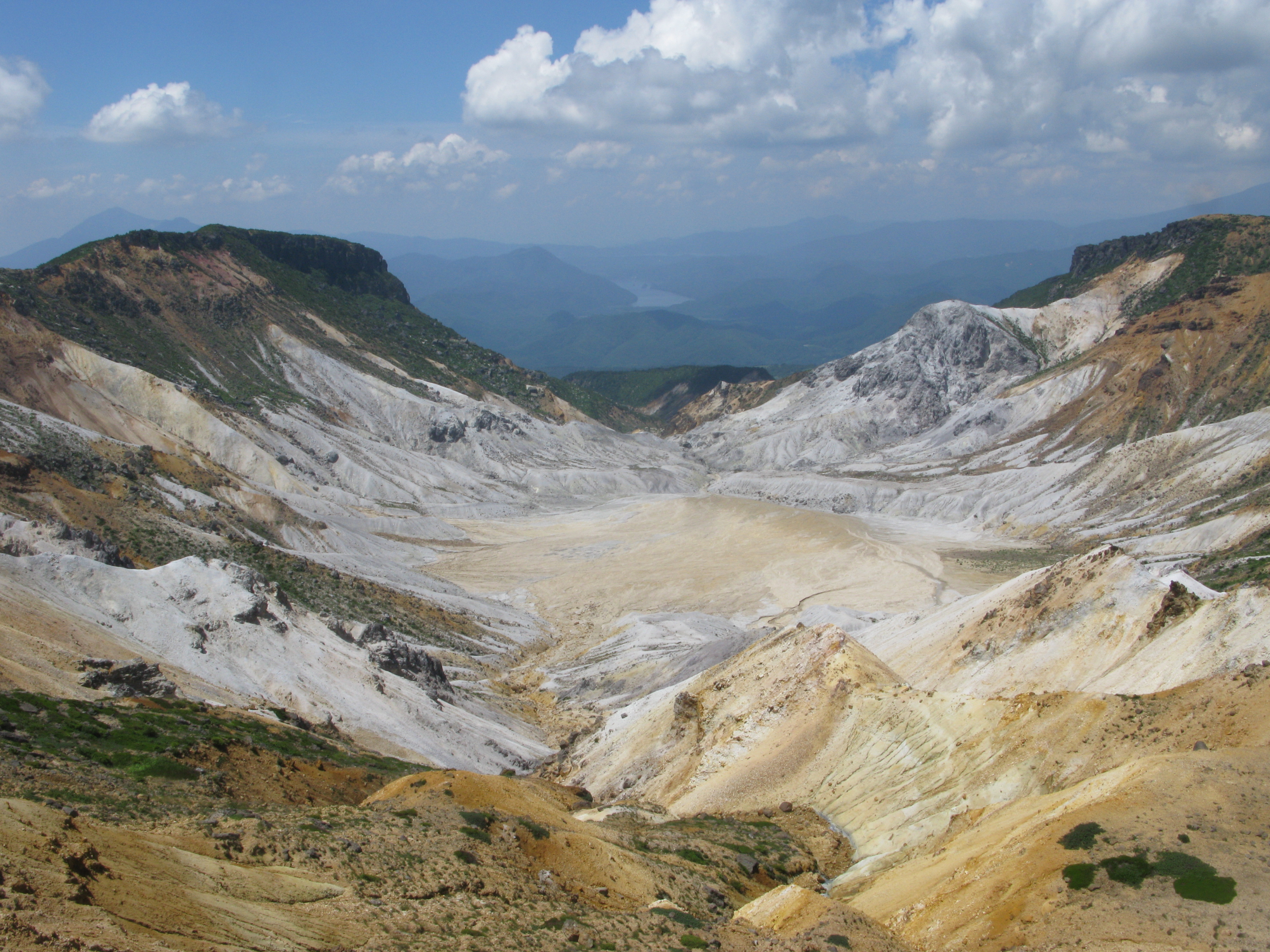
Numanotaira Crater

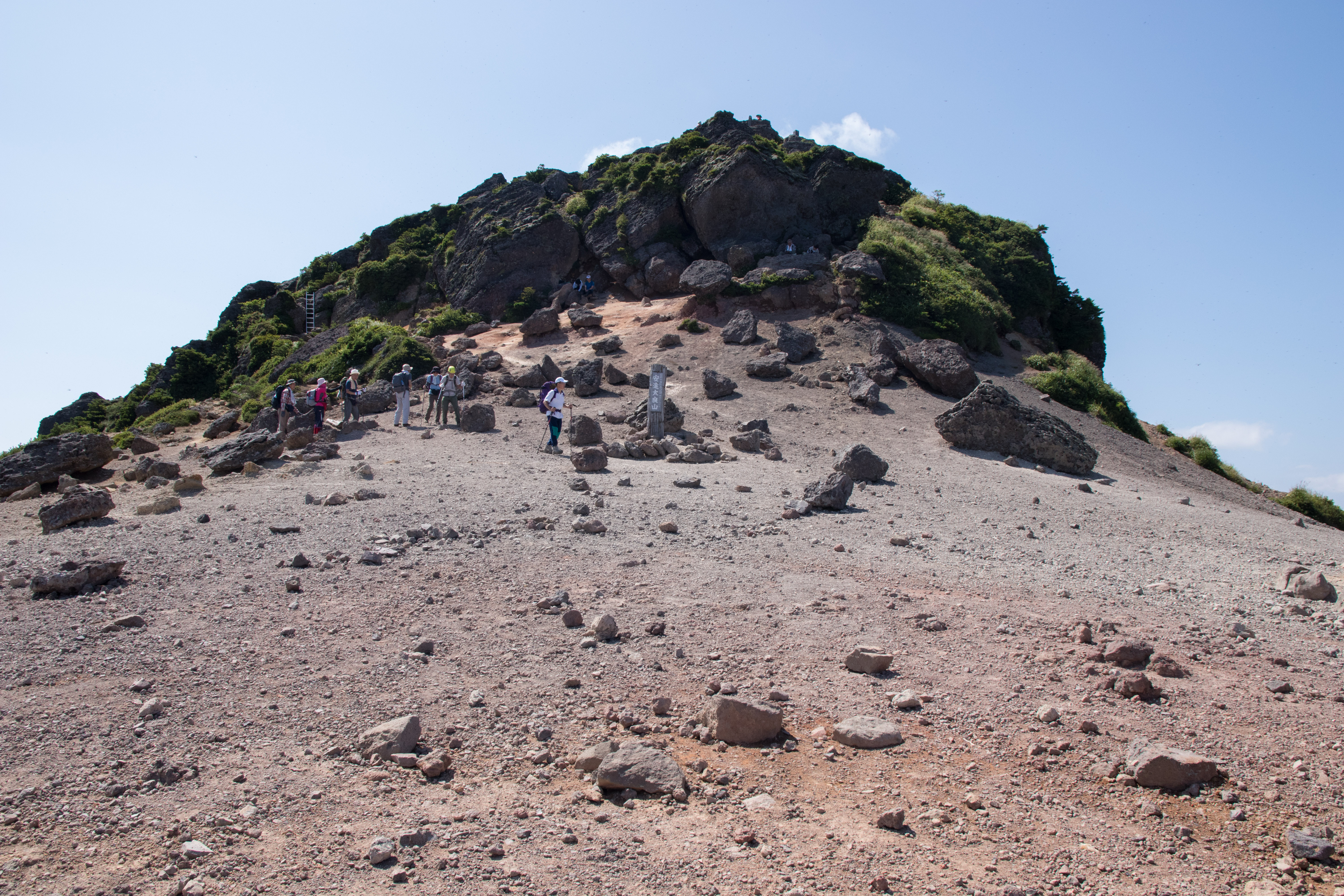
Summit

== See also ==
- List of volcanoes in Japan
- List of mountains in Japan
