= Takamura Kōun =

Japanese sculptor (1852–1934)

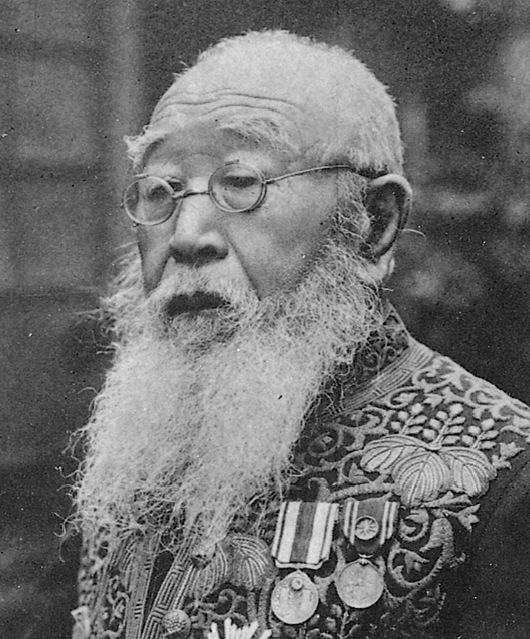
Takamura Kōun in May 1928

Takamura Kōun (高村 光雲; March 8, 1852 – October 10, 1934) was a Japanese sculptor who exerted himself for the modernization of wood carving and a professor of Tokyo School of Fine Arts, who dedicated himself to the education of the future generations.

== Life and career ==
Born in Tokyo as Nakajima Kōzō, he created the bronze statue of Saigō Takamori, completed in 1898, which stands in Ueno Park in Tokyo. He is also the author of the statue of Kusunoki Masahige which stands in front of the Tokyo Imperial Palace.

He studied under Takmura Tōun (高村東雲), a sculptor of Buddhist statues, whose elder sister became Kōun's adoptive parent. He was the father of the poet and sculptor Kōtarō Takamura.

One of his representative works is "Aged Monkey" (Rōen).
