= Kōtarō Takamura =

Japanese poet and sculptor (1883–1956)

- 高村 光太郎
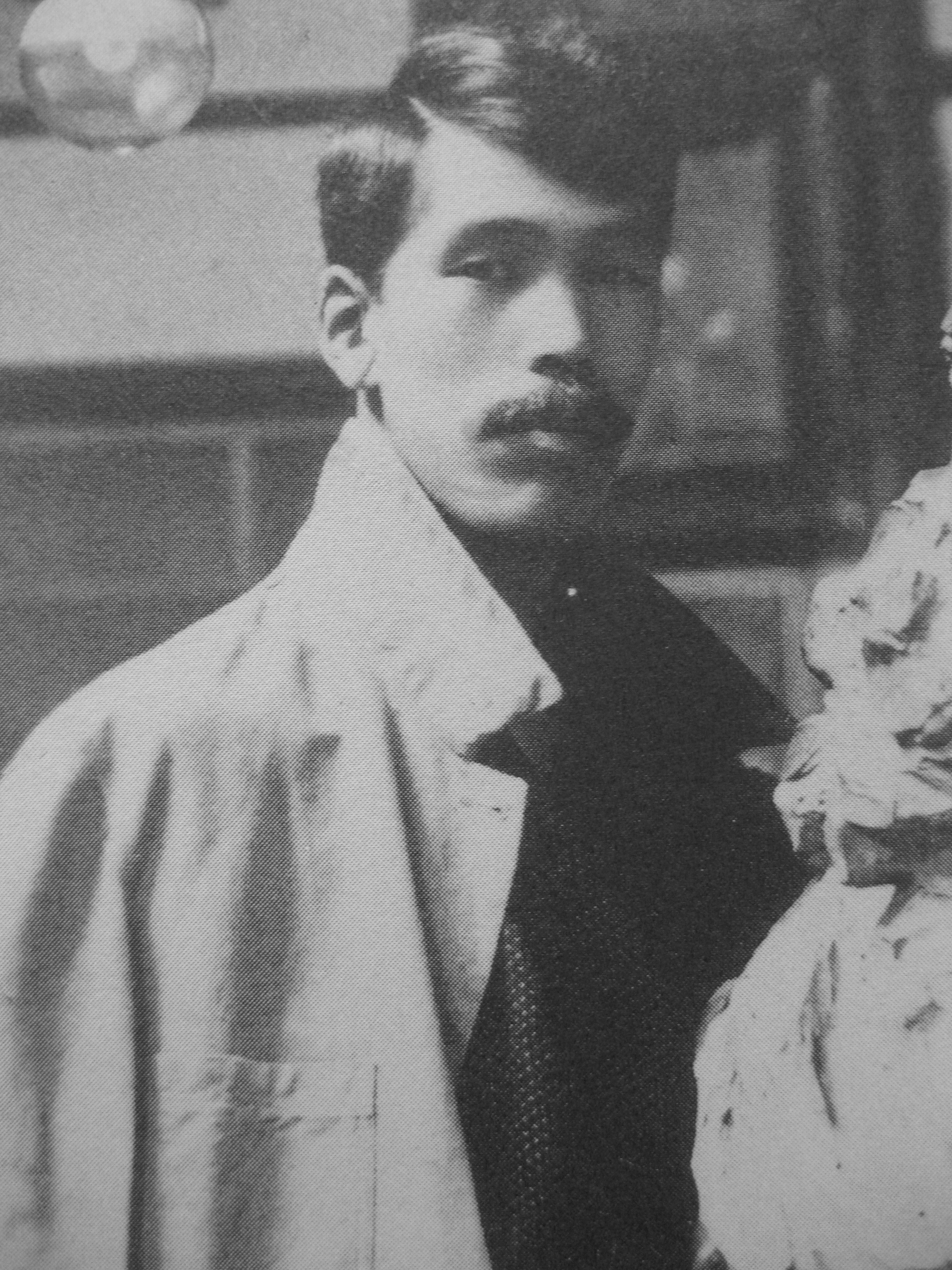
- Kōtarō in 1911, aged 29
- Born: March 13, 1883; Tokyo, Japan
- Died: April 2, 1956 (aged 73); Tokyo, Japan
- Occupations: Poet, writer, sculptor

Kōtarō Takamura (高村 光太郎, Takamura Kōtarō; Japanese pronunciation: [tä̀.kä́.mɯ̈̀.ɾä̀ | kò̞ꜜó̞.tä́.ɾó̞ó̞, -ɾä̀ | ꜜkó̞ó̞.tä́.ɾó̞ó̞, -ɾä̀ kò̞ò̞.tä̀.ɾò̞ò̞]; March 13, 1883 – April 2, 1956) was a Japanese poet and sculptor.

== Biography ==
Takamura was the eldest son of Japanese sculptor Takamura Kōun. He graduated from the Tokyo School of Fine Arts in 1902, where he studied sculpture and oil painting. He studied in New York, at the Art Students League of New York City in 1906. While in New York, Takamura studied under the well known sculptor Gutzon Borglum. Takamura's time spent in America was difficult, and had great impact on his sculpture work and literary work. Takamura additionally studied in London in 1907, where he met his best friend Bernard Leach. After finishing his studies in Paris in 1908, he returned to Japan in 1909 and lived there for the rest of his life. His sculptural work shows strong influence both from Western work (especially Auguste Rodin, whom he idolized) and from the Shirakabaha society. Takamura dedicated his artwork style to separating itself from the traditional Japanese style of art. Takamura and other artists were seen as leaders of a revolution in Japanese artwork.

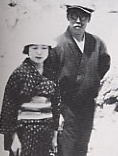
Chieko and Kōtarō

He is also famous for his poems, and especially for his 1941 collection Chiekoshō (智恵子抄, literally "Selections of Chieko", English title "Chieko's sky" after one of the poems therein), a collection of poems about his wife Chieko Takamura née Naganuma, the oil painter, paper artist and early member of the Japanese feminist movement, who died in 1938. In 1951 Takamura received the 2nd Yomiuri Prize.

== Published works ==
- Chieko's sky, 1941 (English translation 1978) - ISBN 0-87011-313-5 (English)
- The Chieko poems, bilingual edition, 2005 - ISBN 1-931243-97-2
- Poèmes à Chieko, bilingual edition (Japanese and French), Presses Universitaires de Bordeaux, 2021, ISBN 979-10-300-0579-0
