= Iwaki City Archaeological Museum =

- いわき市考古資料館
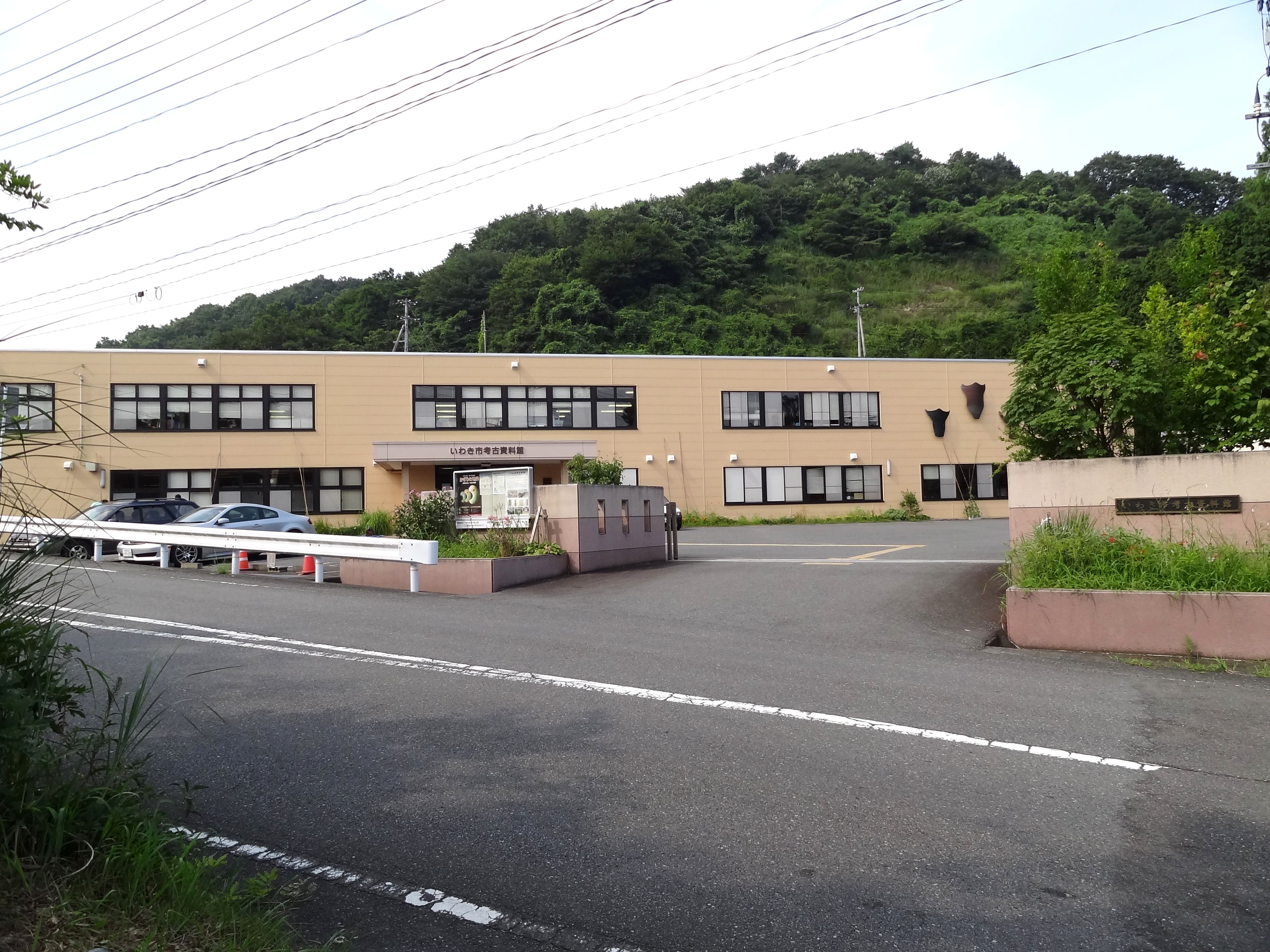

General information
- Location: 50 Tebai, Jōbanfujiwara-machi, Iwaki, Fukushima Prefecture, Japan
- Coordinates: 36°59′49″N 140°49′32″E
- Opened: 1997

Website
- homepage (jp)

Iwaki City Archaeological Museum (いわき市考古資料館, Iwaki-shi Kōko-shiryōkan) opened in Iwaki, Fukushima Prefecture, Japan in 1997. It exhibits artefacts from local excavations, including items from the painted Nakata Cave Tomb (中田横穴).

== See also ==
- Fukushima Museum
- List of Historic Sites of Japan (Fukushima)
- Shiramizu Amidadō
