= Ōtsukayama Kofun =

Historic site in Japan

- 大塚山古墳 (Japanese)
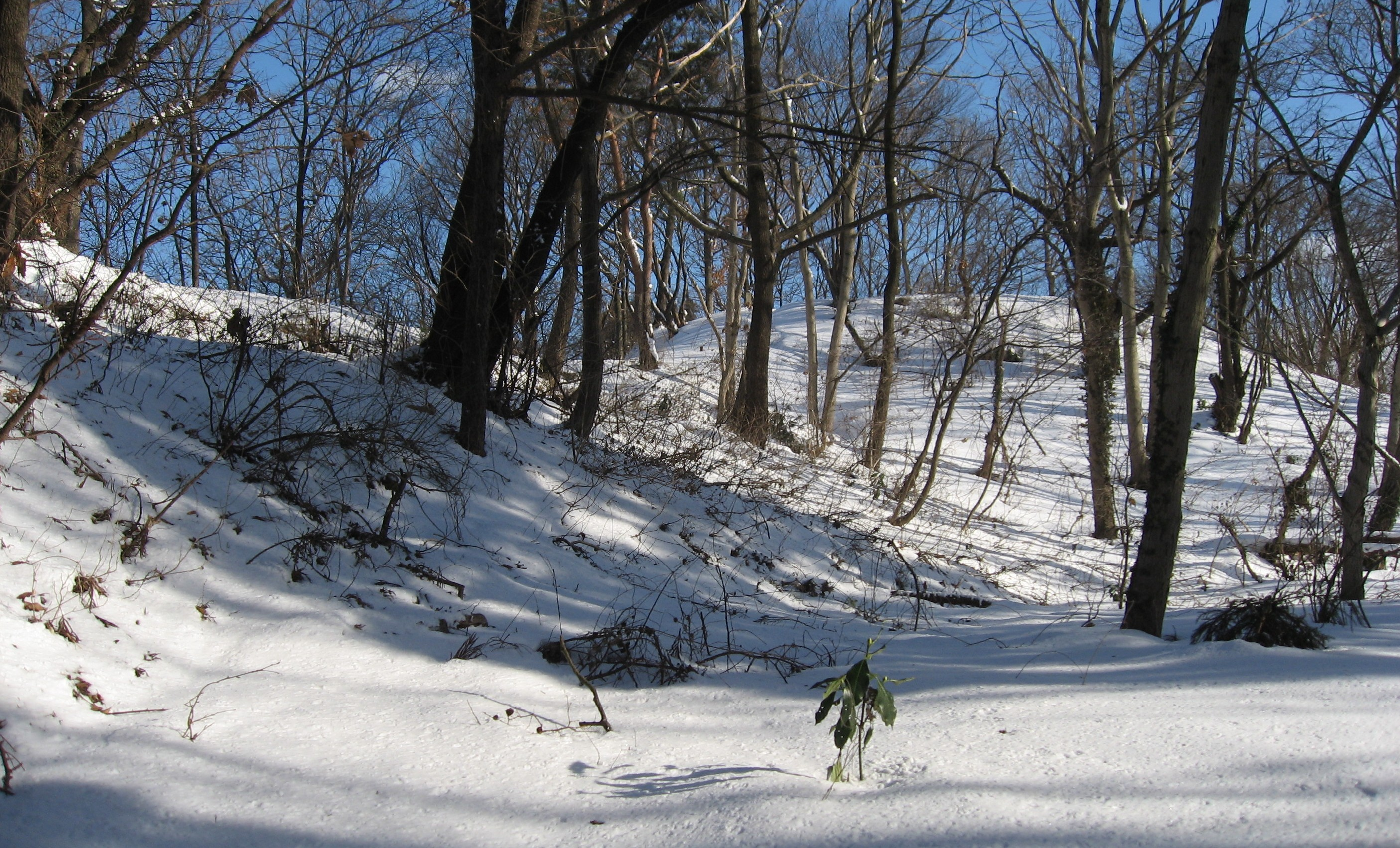
- Ōtsukayama Kofun

- Ōtsukayama Kofun Ōtsukayama Kofun (Japan)
- 37°30′46″N 139°56′39″E
- Type: kofun
- Location: Aizuwakamatsu, Fukushima, Japan
- Region: Tōhoku region

History
- Built: Kofun period

Site notes
- Public access: Yes

The Ōtsukayama Kofun (大塚山古墳, Aizu-Ōtsukayama Kofun) is an early Kofun period zenpō-kōen-fun key-hole shaped tumulus located in what is now part of the city of Aizuwakamatsu, Fukushima in the southern Tōhoku region of Japan. The site was designated a National Historic Site of Japan in 1972. It is the second largest kofun in Fukushima Prefecture after the Kamegamori kofun and the fourth largest in the Tōhoku region. The grave goods recovered from the kofun were collectively designated a National Important Cultural Property of Japan in 1977.

== Overview ==
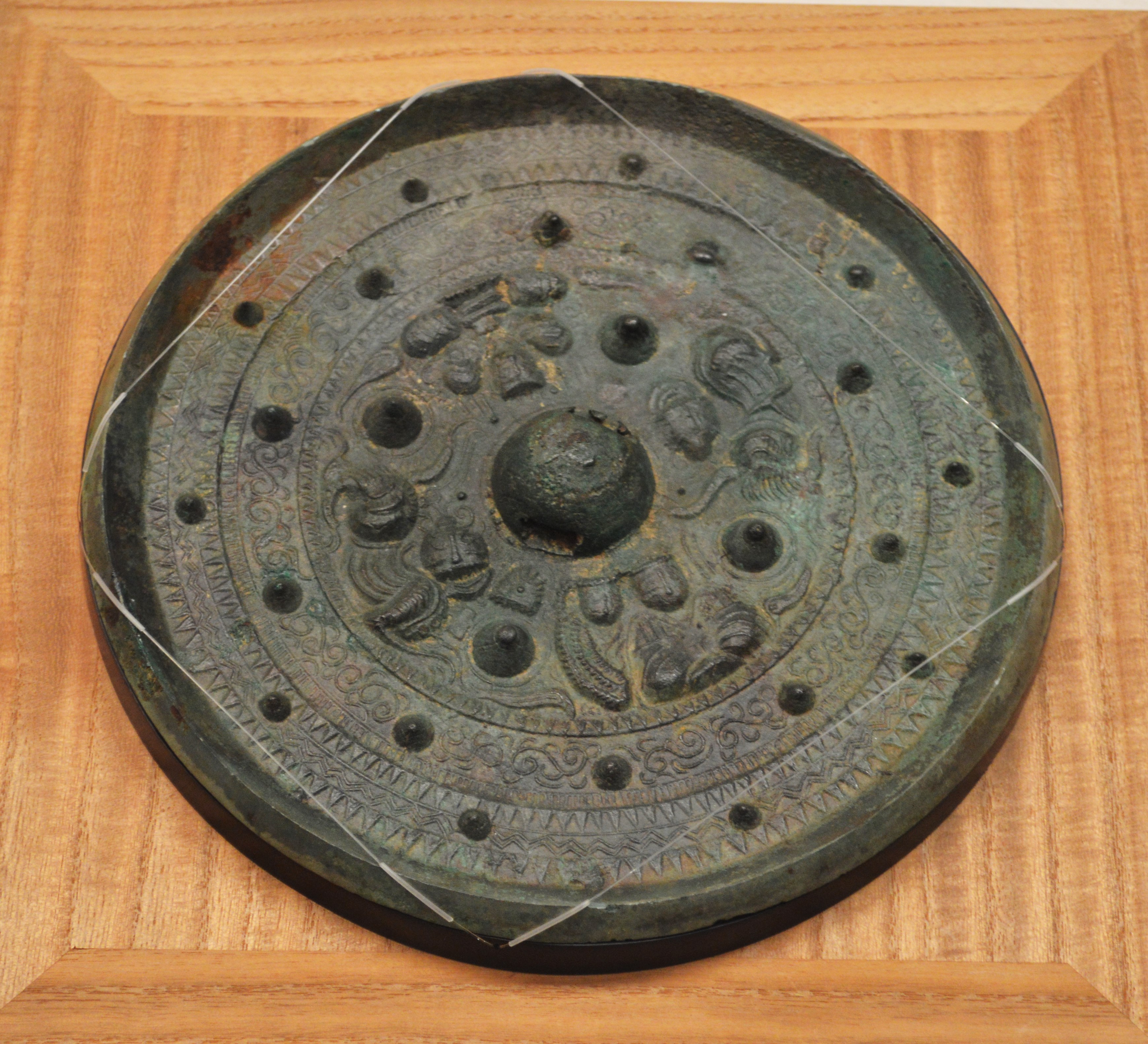
Bronze Mirror recovered from the Ōtsukayama kofun, a National ICP

The Ōtsukayama kofun is located in the southeastern corner of the Aizu Basin, at a height of 30 meters on the summit of Mount Otsukayama. It has a total length of 114 meters, with a rectangular portion length of 54 meters, and a rear circle diameter of 70 meters with a height of 10 meters. The domed portion was built in three tiers and the rectangular portion in two tiers, and it dates from the early Kofun period (the second half of the 4th century).

The tomb was first excavated in 1964, during which time only the domed portion was opened. A burial chamber with two wooden bamboo-shaped sarcophagus was found. A large number of artifacts were recovered from the southern burial vicinity, including a bronze mirror, magatama, tubular beads, fragments of swords, armor and whetstones, for a total of 279 items. The northern sarcophagus vicinity included spindles, cylindrical beads and knives, for a total of 95 items. The artifacts date the kofun to the 6th century AD indicate a strong connection to the Yamato Court. Many of these items are on display at the Fukushima Museum in Aizuwakamatsu.

The site is located about 30 minutes on foot from Aizu-Wakamatsu Station on the JR East Banetsu West Line.

== See also ==
- List of Historic Sites of Japan (Fukushima)
