= Nakata Cave Tombs =

Madina Nesipbek

Nakata Cave Tomb
- 中田横穴 (Japanese)
- Nakata Cave Tomb Nakata Cave Tombs (Japan)
- 37°00′21″N 140°58′01″E
- Type: Yokoanabo
- Periods: Kofun period
- Location: Iwaki, Fukushima, Japan
- Region: Tōhoku region

History
- Built: late 6th century AD

Site notes
- Discovered: 1969
- Public access: No

The Nakata Cave Tomb (中田横穴, Nakata yokoaka) is an archaeological site containing a Kofun period yokoanabo located in what is now part of the city of Iwaki, Fukushima in the southern Tōhoku region of Japan. It is significant in that it is a decorated kofun with geometric patterns painted in red on the walls of the burial chamber. The site was designated a National Historic Site of Japan in 1970.

== Overview ==
The site is located on a tuff hill approximately five kilometers south of the mouth of the Natsui River and was discovered during construction work on a prefectural road in 1969. The hill contained five cave tombs arranged in three rows, the bottom of which extended for 6.67 meters into the hillside, and was the only one which was decorated. The cave-tomb had a drainage groove and several chambers, each blocked by a stone gate. The decoration is the in form of three rows of continuous lines of red and white triangles, about 40-cm on a side, which covered the rear and side walls of the innermost chamber. Also noteworthy as the fact that the floor had also been painted with the red pigment. Grave goods found in a side niche in the tomb included straight swords, bronze bells, fragments of armor, beads, magatama, rings, horse trappings, bronze cooking vessels and a large amount of Sue ware pottery. It is estimated to date from the second half of the sixth century.

It was formerly open to the public for a few days each year; however after damage by the 2011 Tōhoku earthquake and tsunami it has bene closed. Excavated artifacts are exhibited at the Iwaki City Archaeological Museum

The site is approximately 20 minutes by car from Iwaki Station on the JR East Jōban Line.

== See also ==
- List of Historic Sites of Japan (Fukushima)
