= List of historic sites of Japan (Fukushima) =

This list is of the historic sites of Japan located within the Prefecture of Fukushima.

== National Historic Sites ==
As of 17 December 2021, fifty-four Sites have been designated as being of national significance.

Site	Municipality	Comments	Image	Coordinates	Type	Ref.
Atsukashiyama Barrier 阿津賀志山防塁 Atsukashiyama bōrui	Kunimi	late Heian period fortification	Atsukashiyama Barrier	37°52′19″N 140°34′30″E	2	395
Ayutaki Ferry Site 鮎滝渡船場跡 Ayutaki tosenba ato	Fukushima			37°41′04″N 140°29′53″E	6	365
Uzumine 宇津峰 Uzumine	Sukagawa/Kōriyama		Uzumine	37°17′45″N 140°28′15″E	2	349
Hayama Cave Tombs 羽山横穴 Hayama yokoana	Minamisōma	Kofun period cave-tombs		37°36′52″N 140°57′26″E	1	392
Urajiri Shell Mound 浦尻貝塚 Urajiri kaizuka	Minamisōma	Jōmon period shell midden		37°31′16″N 141°01′23″E	1	00003467
Yokodaidō Steel Production Site 横大道製鉄遺跡 Yokodaidō seitetsu iseki	Minamisōma	Heian period ruins		37°33′16″N 140°56′44″E	6	00003698
Shimotoriwata Memorial Stele 下鳥渡供養石塔 Shimotoriwata kuyō-seki-tō	Fukushima	Kamakura period stone monument	Shimotoriwata Memorial Stele	37°43′38″N 140°24′54″E	3	356
Shimotsuke Kaidō 下野街道 Shimotsuke Kaidō	Shimogō	Pre-modern highway	Shimotsuke Kaidō	37°20′07″N 139°51′54″E	6	3320
Aizushingū Castle ruins 会津新宮城跡 Aizushingū-jō ato	Kitakata	Nanboku-chō period castle ruins		37°37′21″N 139°50′07″E	2	00003639
Aizu Matsudaira clan cemetery 会津藩主松平家墓所 Aizu-han-shū Matsudaira-ke bosho	Aizuwakamatsu/Inawashiro	Edo period daimyō cemetery	Aizu Matsudaira clan cemetery	37°29′11″N 139°57′36″E	7	397
Kannondō Stone Buddhas 観音堂石仏 Kannondō sekibutsu	Minamisōma	Heian period bas-relief sculptures	Daihizan Stone Buddhas	37°32′34″N 140°59′05″E	3	348
Kamegamori-Chinjumori Kofun 亀ヶ森・鎮守森古墳 Kamegamori・Chinjumori kofun	Aizubange	Kofun period tumuli	Kamegamori-Chinjumori Kofun	37°35′31″N 139°49′40″E	1	393
Miyahata Site 宮畑遺跡 Miyahata iseki	Fukushima	Jōmon period settlement ruins	Miyahata Site	37°47′24″N 140°30′55″E	1	3373
Miyawaki temple ruins 宮脇廃寺跡 Miyawaki Haiji ato	Date			37°49′09″N 140°33′46″E	3	00003833
Former Takizawa Honjin 旧滝沢本陣 kyū-Takizawa honjin	Aizuwakamatsu	Edo period building	Former Takizawa Honjin	37°30′23″N 139°57′10″E	6	385
former Nihonmatsu Domain Monumental Stele 旧二本松藩戒石銘碑 kyū-Nihonmatsu-han kaisekimeihi	Nihonmatsu	Edo period stone monument	Former Nihonmatsu Domain Monumental Stele	37°35′54″N 140°25′58″E	4	359
Kōri-Nishiyama Castle ruins 桑折西山城跡 Kōri-Nishiyama-jō ato	Koori	Sengoku period castle ruins		37°51′17″N 140°30′28″E	2	398
Enichi-ji ruins 慧日寺跡 Enichi-ji ato	Bandai	Buddhist temple founded in early Heian period	Enichi-ji ruins	37°34′09″N 139°58′56″E	3	387
Furuyashiki Site 古屋敷遺跡 Furuyashiki iseki	Kitakata	Kofun period settlement ruins		37°36′32″N 139°50′08″E	1	3271
Mukaihaguroyama Castle ruins 向羽黒山城跡 Mukaihaguroyama shiro ato	Aizumisato	Sengoku period castle ruins	Mukaihaguroyama Castle ruins	37°26′40″N 139°54′02″E	2	3296
Kabutozuka Kofun 甲塚古墳 Kabutozuka kofun	Iwaki	Kofun period tumulus	Kabutozuka Kofun	37°03′12″N 140°56′31″E	1	342
Negishi Kanga ruins 根岸官衙遺跡群 Negishi kanga iseki-gun	Iwaki	Heian period county headquarters		37°02′46″N 140°57′23″E	2	00003448
Sakurai Kofun 桜井古墳 Sakurai kofun	Minamisōma	Kofun period tumulus	Sakurai Kofun	37°38′29″N 140°59′29″E	1	377
Aizuwakamatsu Castle ruins 若松城跡 Wakamatsu-jō ato	Aizuwakamatsu	Edo period castle	Aizuwakamatsu Castle ruins	37°29′15″N 139°55′47″E	2	354
Komine Castle ruins 小峰城跡 Komine-jō ato	Shirakawa	Edo period castle	Komine Castle ruins	37°07′57″N 140°12′49″E	2	00003679
Shōnindan temple ruins 上人壇廃寺跡 Shōnindan Haiji iseki	Sukagawa	Nara period temple ruins	Shōnindan temple ruins	37°18′08″N 140°22′24″E	3	384
Shinchi Shell Mound - Tenagamyō Jinja Site 新地貝塚附手長明神社跡 Shinchi kaizuka tsuketari Tenagamyō Jinja ato	Shinchi	Jōmon period shell midden		37°51′52″N 140°54′56″E	1, 3	346
Mano Kofun Cluster 真野古墳群 Mano kofun-gun	Minamisōma	Kofun period tumuli		37°41′50″N 140°57′21″E	1	394
Jingamine Castle ruins 陣が峯城跡 Jingamine-jō ato	Aizubange	Heian period castle ruins	Jingamine Castle ruins	37°35′43″N 139°48′41″E	2	00003537
Sukagawa Ichirizuka 須賀川一里塚 Sukagawa ichirizuka	Sukagawa	Edo period milestone	Sukagawa Ichirizuka	37°16′28″N 140°21′47″E	6	361
Sugama Tōfuku-ji Stone Reliquary 須釜東福寺舎利石塔 Sugama Tōfukuji shari sekitō	Tamakawa		Sugama Tōfukuji Stone Reliquary	37°12′15″N 140°27′18″E	3	358
Kiyotosaku Cave Tombs 清戸迫横穴 Kiyotosaku ōketsu	Futaba	Kofun period cave-tombs	Kiyotosaku Cave Tombs	37°26′31″N 141°00′17″E	1	383
Ishimotai Memorial Stele 石母田供養石塔 Ishimotai kuyō sekitō	Kunimi	Kamakura period stone monument		37°53′32″N 140°33′03″E	3	357
Izumi Kanga ruins 泉官衙遺跡 Izumi kanga iseki	Minamisōma	Heian period county headquarters		37°38′49″N 141°00′58″E	2	00003657
Izumizaki Cave Tomb 泉崎横穴 Izumizaki yokoana	Izumizaki	Kofun period cave tombs	Izumizaki Cave Tomb	37°09′10″N 140°19′02″E	1	352
Ōyasuba Kofun 大安場古墳 Ōyasuba kofun	Kōriyama	Kofun period tumulus	Ōyasuba Kofun	37°21′23″N 140°24′12″E	1	3260
Ōtsukayama Kofun 大塚山古墳 Ōtsukayama kofun	Aizuwakamatsu	Kofun period tumulus	Ōtsukayama Kofun	37°30′46″N 139°56′39″E	1	390
Nakata Cave Tombs 中田横穴 Nakata yokoana	Iwaki	Kofun period cave-tombs		37°00′21″N 140°58′01″E	1	386
Nanko Park 南湖公園 Nanko kōen	Shirakawa	Edo period gardens, also a Place of Scenic Beauty	Nanko Park	37°06′37″N 140°12′57″E	8	344
Nihonmatsu Castle Site 二本松城跡 Nihonmatsu-jō ato	Nihonmatsu	Edo period castle	Nihonmatsu Castle Ste	37°35′56″N 140°25′45″E	2	00003538
Shirakawa Kanga ruins 白河官衙遺跡群 Shirakawa kanga iseki-gun	Izumizaki	Heian period county headquarters; designation includes the sites of the Sekiwaku Kanga site (関和久官衙遺跡) and Kariyado temple ruins (借宿廃寺跡)	Shirakawa Kangas ruins	37°07′46″N 140°18′36″E	2	396
Shirakawa Barrier Site 白河関跡 Shirakawa-no-seki ato	Shirakawa	Checkpoint on ancient highway	Shirakawa Barrier Site	37°02′50″N 140°13′46″E	6	381
Shirakawa Funada-Motonuma Sites 白河舟田・本沼遺跡群 Shirakawa Funada・Motonuma iseki-gun	Shirakawa	Kofun period tumuli and settlement	Shirakawa Funada - Motonuma Sites	37°08′10″N 140°17′11″E	1	00003447
Shiramizu Amidadō Precincts 白水阿弥陀堂境域 Shiramizu Amida-dō kyōiki	Iwaki	Buddhist temple founded in Kamakura period	Shiramizu Amida-dō Precincts	37°02′08″N 140°50′11″E	3	382
Shirakawa Castle ruins 白川城跡 Shirakawa-jō ato	Shirakawa	Kamakura to Sengoku period fortress of the Yūki clan	Shirakawa Castle ruins	37°07′35″N 140°12′39″E	2	00003945
Beizanji Sutra Mounds 米山寺経塚群 Beizanji kyōzuka-gun	Sukagawa	Kamakura period Buddhist relics		37°18′01″N 140°21′47″E	3	364
Nagare temple ruins 流廃寺跡 Nagare Haiji ato	Tanagura			37°01′48″N 140°22′47″E	3	00003834
Mount Ryōzen 霊山 Ryōzen	Date/Sōma	Nanboku-chō period castle; also a Place of Scenic Beauty	Mount Ryōzen	37°46′27″N 140°40′59″E	2	353
Wadai Site 和台遺跡 Wadai iseki	Fukushima	Jōmon period settlement ruins		37°39′02″N 140°31′45″E	1	00003497
Tanagura Castle Site 棚倉城跡 Tanagura-jō ato	Tanagura		Tanagura Castle Site	37°01′48″N 140°23′09″E	2	00004056
Date clan Yanagawa Sites 伊達氏梁川遺跡群 Date-shi Yanagawa iseki-gun	Date	Kamakura to Edo period fortification	Date Clan Yanagawa Sites	37°51′19″N 140°36′39″E	2	00004079
Tennōyama Site 天王山遺跡; Tennōyama iseki	Shirakawa			37°04′N 140°14′E		
Kashiwagi Castle ruins 柏木城跡; Kashiwagi-jō ato	Kitashiobara			37°39′58″N 139°58′36″E		

== Prefectural Historic Sites ==
As of 1 June 2021, forty-six Sites have been designated as being of prefectural importance.

Site	Municipality	Comments	Image	Coordinates	Type	Ref.
Yuno-Nishihara temple ruins 湯野西原廃寺跡; Yuno-Nishihara Haiji ato	Fukushima			37°50′18″N 140°27′47″E		for all refs see
Iinohakusan Residence ruins 飯野白山住居跡; Iinohakusan jūkyo ato	Fukushima			37°38′57″N 140°31′59″E		
Tsukanome No. 1 Tumulus (Hachimanzuka Kofun) 塚野目第一号墳 (八幡塚古墳); Tsukanome daiichi-gō fun (Hachimanzuka kofun)	Kunimi			37°51′51″N 140°33′02″E		
Harase-Uehara Site 原瀬上原遺跡; Harase-Uehara iseki	Nihonmatsu			37°35′06″N 140°23′24″E		
Futagozuka Kofun 二子塚古墳; Futagozuka kofun	Ōtama			37°32′15″N 140°23′12″E		
Keiseidan Kofun 傾城壇古墳; Keiseidan kofun	Ōtama/Nihonmatsu			37°32′29″N 140°24′34″E		
Kohatayama Sutra Mounds 木幡山経塚群; Kohatayama Kyōzuka-gun	Nihonmatsu			37°37′35″N 140°34′51″E		
Suzuki Shinkyō Grave 鈴木信教墓; Suzuki Shinkyō no haka	Kōriyama			37°23′45″N 140°22′48″E		
Ezoana Kofun 蝦夷穴古墳; Ezoana kofun	Sukagawa			37°16′58″N 140°23′55″E		
Naganumaminami Old Residence 長沼南古舘; Naganumaminami kodate	Sukagawa			37°17′25″N 140°12′04″E		
Stone Amida Triad Memorial Tower 石造阿弥陀三尊来迎供養塔 sekizō Amida sanzon raigō kuyō-tō	Sukagawa			37°18′44″N 140°16′32″E		
Ryūgazuka Kofun 竜ヶ塚古墳; Ryūgazuka kofun	Ten'ei			37°15′05″N 140°15′12″E		
Ōdan Kofun Cluster 大壇古墳群; Ōdan kofun-gun	Ishikawa			37°09′17″N 140°23′31″E		
Toriuchi Site 鳥内遺跡; Toriuchi iseki	Ishikawa			37°09′59″N 140°24′39″E		
Akudo Kofun Cluster 悪戸古墳群; Akudo kofun-gun	Ishikawa			37°10′46″N 140°24′40″E		
Miyanomae Kofun 宮ノ前古墳; Miyanomae kofun	Tamakawa			37°12′01″N 140°24′23″E		
Maeda Site 前田遺跡 (環状列石); Maeda iseki (kanjō resseki)	Tamura	stone circle		37°27′46″N 140°36′24″E		
Oniana Kofun 鬼穴古墳; Oniana kofun	Yabuki			37°11′56″N 140°23′31″E		
Kannonyama Cliff Memorial Stelai 観音山磨崖供養塔婆群; Kannonyama magai kuyō-tōba-gun	Izumizaki			37°11′09″N 140°17′26″E		
Ōtoko Kiln Sites 大戸窯跡群; Ōtoko yōseki-gun	Aizuwakamatsu			37°24′27″N 39°55′24″E		
Inawashiro Castle ruins - Tsurumine Castle Site 猪苗代城跡附鶴峰城跡; Inawashiro-jō ato tsuketari Tsurumine-jō ato	Inawashiro			37°33′43″N 140°06′10″E		
Nukazuka Kofun Cluster 糠塚古墳群; Nukazuka kofun-gun	Kitakata			37°39′41″N 139°53′18″E		
Sawara Yoshitsura Grave 伝佐原義連の墓 den Sawara Yoshitsura no haka	Kitakata			37°41′58″N 139°50′42″E		
Beppu Ichirizuka 別府の一里塚; Beppu no ichirizuka	Kitakata			37°36′11″N 139°53′31″E		
Tokoyoharada Site 常世原田遺跡; Tokoyoharada iseki	Kitakata			37°37′01″N 139°55′30″E		
Former Ichinoto Village Notice Board 旧一戸村制札場 kyū-Ichinoto-mura seihatsuba	Kitakata			37°43′24″N 139°46′44″E		
Kinegamori Kofun 杵ガ森古墳; Kinegamori kofun	Aizubange			37°33′59″N 139°48′36″E		
Daikō-ji Memorial Stele 大光寺供養塔; Daikōji kuyō-tō	Aizumisato			37°26′31″N 139°51′18″E		
Shigiyama Castle ruins 鴫山城跡; Shigiyama-jō ato	Minamiaizu			37°11′54″N 139°46′14″E		
Hisakawa Castle ruins 久川城跡; Hisakawa-jō ato	Minamiaizu			37°11′20″N 139°31′29″E		
Kubota Site 窪田遺跡; Kubota iseki	Tadami			37°18′37″N 139°26′41″E		
Nakamura Castle ruins 中村城跡; Nakamura-jō ato	Sōma			37°47′53″N 140°54′51″E		
Kankaidō 観海堂; Kankaidō	Shinchi			37°52′42″N 140°55′30″E		
Sanganji Shell Mound 三貫地貝塚; Sanganji kaizuka	Shinchi			37°50′39″N 140°54′19″E		
Yokote temple ruins 横手廃寺跡; Yokote Haiji ato	Minamisōma			37°43′11″N 140°56′59″E		
Yokote Kofun Cluster 横手古墳群; Yokote kofun-gun	Minamisōma			37°42′51″N 140°57′30″E		
Izumi temple ruins 泉廃寺跡; Izumi Haiji ato	Minamisōma			37°38′59″N 141°00′38″E		
Odaka Castle ruins 小高城跡; Odaka-jō ato	Minamisōma			37°34′05″N 140°59′27″E		
Motoyashiki Kofun Cluster 本屋敷古墳群; Motoyashiki kofun-gun	Namie			37°29′58″N 141°00′14″E		
Tenjinhara Site 天神原遺跡; Tenjinhara iseki	Naraha			37°15′56″N 141°00′51″E		
Kinkanzuka Kofun 金冠塚古墳; Kinkanzuka kofun	Iwaki			36°53′48″N 140°46′43″E		
Takaku Old Residence 高久の古館; Takaku no kodate	Iwaki			37°01′54″N 140°56′54″E		
Tamayama Kofun 玉山古墳; Tamayama kofun	Iwaki			37°06′54″N 140°56′38″E		
Yanagawa Castle ruins and Gardens 梁川城跡及び庭園; Yanagawa-jō ato oyobi teien	Date	also a Prefectural Place of Scenic Beauty		37°51′19″N 140°36′41″E		
Former Yanagawa Kameoka Hachiman-gū and Temple Precinct 旧梁川亀岡八幡宮並びに別当寺境域 kyū-Yanagawa Kameoka Hachimangū narabini bettōji kyōiki	Date	also a Prefectural Place of Scenic Beauty		37°51′59″N 140°36′46″E		
Senshō-ji Precinct 専称寺境域; Senshōji kyōiki	Iwaki	also a Prefectural Place of Scenic Beauty		37°03′25″N 140°55′36″E		

== Municipal Historic Sites ==
As of 1 May 2021, a further three hundred and thirty-nine Sites have been designated at a municipal level.

== Registered Historic Sites ==
As of 1 December 2021, one Monument has been registered (as opposed to designated) as an Historic Site at a national level.

Site	Municipality	Comments	Image	Coordinates	Type	Ref.
Aizu Mount Iimori Byakkotai Graves 会津飯盛山白虎隊士墳墓域; Aizu Iimori-yama Byakkotai-shi funbo iki	Aizuwakamatsu			37°30′15″N 139°57′16″E		

== See also ==
- Cultural Properties of Japan
- Mutsu Province
- Fukushima Museum
- List of Cultural Properties of Japan - paintings (Fukushima)
- List of Places of Scenic Beauty of Japan (Fukushima)
