= Shimotoriwata Memorial Stele =

- 下鳥渡供養石塔 (Japanese)
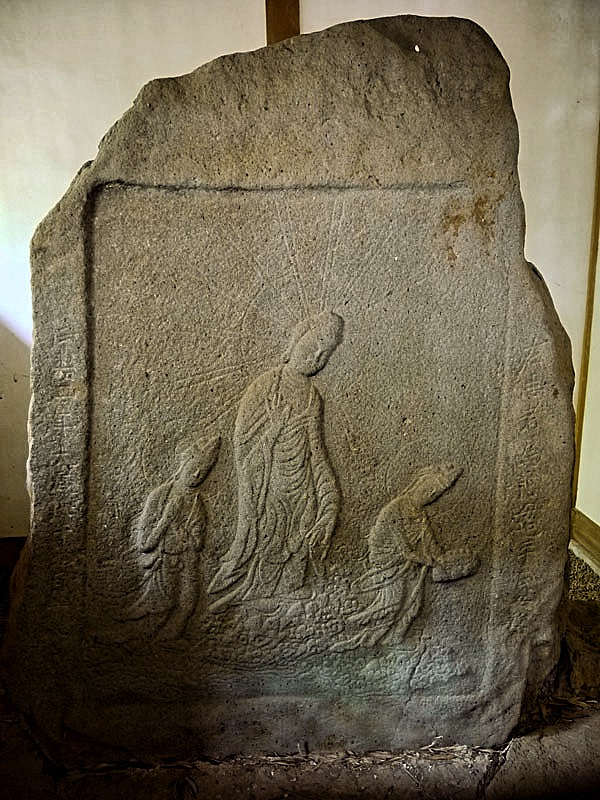
- Shimotoriwata Stele

- Shimotoriwata Memorial Stele Shimotoriwata Memorial Stele (Japan)
- 37°43′38″N 140°24′54″E
- Type: stele
- Periods: Kamakura period
- Location: Fukushima, Fukushima, Japan
- Region: Tōhoku region

Site notes
- Public access: Yes

Shimotoriwata Memorial Stele (下鳥渡供養石塔, Shimotoriwata kuyō-sekitō) is a Kamakura period stele located within the grounds of the Sōtō Zen temple of Yosen-ji in the city of Fukushima, Fukushima Prefecture, in the Tōhoku region of northern Japan. The stele was designated a National Historic Site of Japan in 1935 by the Japanese government.

== Overview ==
The stele is made of andesite and has a height of 170 cm and a width of 115 cm. The surface has the bas-relief carvings depicting Amida Nyōrai, Seishi Bosatsu and Kannon Bostatsu. An inscription on the far left of the carving indicates that this is a memorial stone erected for the mother-in-law of a person named Taira, and the inscription on the right gives the date of September 18, 1258.

Shimowatari, where this stone monument is located, is in the southern portion of the Fukushima Basin. During the Kamakura period, this area was controlled by the Nikaido clan, who claimed descent from the Fujiwara clan, and it is uncertain as to the identity of the Taira clan person indicated on the memorial. Documentation or inscriptions of any kind from the Kamakura period are rare in the Fukushima area, which led to the designation of this stele as a National Historic Site in 1935; however, since that time numerous other stele from the same period have been found in the vicinity. The stele is now protected from the elements by a small wooden chapel.

The temple of Yosen-ji is located approximately 14 minutes by car from Minami-Fukushima Station.

== See also ==
- List of Historic Sites of Japan (Fukushima)
