= Ishimotai Memorial Stele =

Ishimota Memorial Stele
- 石母田供養石塔 (Japanese)
- Ishimota Memorial Stele Ishimotai Memorial Stele (Japan)
- 37°53′32″N 140°33′03″E
- Type: stele
- Periods: Kamakura period
- Location: Kunimi, Fukushima, Japan
- Region: Tōhoku region

History
- Built: 1308

Site notes
- Public access: Yes

Ishimota Memorial Stele (石母田供養石塔, Ishimota kuyō sekitō) is a Kamakura period stone stele located in the town of Kunimi, Fukushima Prefecture, in the Tōhoku region of northern Japan. The stele was designated a National Historic Site of Japan in 1935 by the Japanese government.

== Overview ==
The stele is made of andesite, with a height of 1.8 meters, width of 44 cm and thickness of 30 cm. Although popularly referred to as the Mongolian Stele (蒙古の碑), the stele does not appear to have any connection to the Mongol invasions of Japan. Instead, it is a memorial stele dedicated to the parents and ancestors of a Buddhist monk named "Chisen". The inscription is written in Siddhaṃ script and Chinese, in calligraphy by the naturalized priest Yishan Yining, a notable prelate of the Rinzai school and pioneer of the Gozan Bungaku literature. The monument has is dated 1308.

Documentation or inscriptions of any kind from the Kamakura period are rare in the Fukushima area, which led to the designation of this stele as a National Historic Site in 1935. The surrounding area is said to be the site of a temple called Manpuku-ji, of which no trace now exists. The stele is now protected from the elements by a small wooden chapel.

The stele is located approximately 25 minutes on foot from Fujita Station on the JR East Tōhoku Main Line.

== See also ==
- List of Historic Sites of Japan (Fukushima)
