= Tennōyama Site =

Archaeological site in Japan

- 天王山遺跡 (Japanese)
- Tennōyama Site Tennōyama Site (Japan)
- Interactive map of Tennōyama Site
- 37°04′00″N 140°14′00″E
- Periods: Yayoi period
- Location: Shirakawa, Fukushima, Japan
- Region: Tōhoku region

History
- Built: 1st century AD

Site notes
- Elevation: 27 m (89 ft)
- Public access: No

The Tennōyama Site (天王山遺跡, Tennōyama iseki) is an archaeological site with traces of a late Yayoi period (circa 1st century AD) settlement, located in the city of Shirakawa, Fukushima in the southern Tōhoku region of Japan. It was designated a National Historic Site in 2021.

== Overview ==
The Tennōyama ruins are located about four kilometers east of the center of the modern city of Shirakawa, on the left bank of the Abukuma River, at the top of a 407-meter-high independent hill. The elevation difference from the base of the hill is approximately 80 meters. A large amount of Yayoi pottery fragments were unearthed during the reclamation work on the hilltop, which began in December 1949. The first archaeological excavation was conducted from February to May 1950 at 20 locations, with prehistoric storage pits, foundations of pit dwellings and rows of river stones were identified. Subsequent excavations found stone arrowheads, stone tools, clay spindle wheels, magatama and large quantities of carbonized rice and carbonized chestnuts. These artifacts, known as the "Tennōyama Site Artifacts," were designated as collectively as an Important Cultural Property in 2024. The pottery is known as "Tennōyama-style pottery," and is found in other locations in the southern Tōhoku and Hokuriku regions.T he pottery includes jars, earthenware containers, high-top vessels, and bowls, with some jars equipped with spouts and katakuri (single-spouted vessels). The jars and jars are notable for their cylindrical necks with wavy or protruding rims, and the ground patterns are Jōmon, often running vertically or horizontally. The distinctive patterns are alternating pierced and thrusted patterns, which create a wavy sunken line effect. Other examples include linked arc patterns and modified kō-ji (work-shaped) patterns, with the Jomon erasing technique also being widely used. Among these, the wavy or protruding rim, deformed "Kō" (artificial character) pattern, and worn-out Jōmon pattern are similar to the characteristics of pottery from the late Jōmon period, and it is well-known in academic history that this has led to debate over the dating of "Tennōyama-style pottery." Currently, the vertical and horizontal Jōmon pattern is thought to have been influenced by Esan-style pottery found in Hokkaido, and Jōmon-style elements are understood to have a lineage in the Epi-Jōmon culture.

The Tennōyama Site is located on private property, and is not open to the public. The site is approximately two kilometers south of Kutano Station on the JR East Tōhoku Main Line.

== See also ==
- List of Historic Sites of Japan (Fukushima)
