= Shirakawa Kanga ruins =

Archaeological sites in Japan

- 白河官衙遺跡群 (Japanese)
- Shirakawa Kanga ruins Shirakawa Kanga ruins (Japan)
- 37°7′43.4″N 140°18′37.7″E
- Type: settlement
- Periods: Nara to Heian period
- Location: Izumizaki, Fukushima, Japan
- Region: Tōhoku region

Site notes
- Public access: None (no public facilities)

The Shirakawa Kanga ruins (白河官衙遺跡群, Shirakawa kanga iseki gun) is a group of archaeological sites containing the ruins of the Nara to early Heian period government administrative complex for ancient Shirakawa District of Mutsu Province. It is located in what is now part of the village of Izumizaki, Fukushima in the Tōhoku region of Japan. The site was designated a National Historic Site of Japan in 1984. The designation includes the ruins of the Sekiwaku Kanga ruins (関和久官衙遺跡) and the nearby Kariyado temple ruins (借宿廃寺跡)

== Overview ==
Following the Taika reforms of 645 AD and the establishment of the Ritsuryō system, Japan was administratively divided into provinces which were further subdivided into districts, each with an administrative center and tax warehouses designed per a common template. Ancient Shirakawa District encompassed the modern city of Shirakawa, Nishishirakawa District, Fukushima, Higashishirakawa District, Fukushima and Ishikawa District, Fukushima.

=== Sekiwaku Kanga ruins ===
The Sekiwaku Kanga ruins (関和久官衙遺跡, Sekiwaku Kanga iseki) are located on a river terrace on the northern shore of the Abukuma River, and has a rectangular shape of 270 meters east–west and 460 meters north–south. Numerous roof tiles and foundation stones were uncovered by amateur historians and local inhabitants before World War II, and the resemblance of the building layout to Taga Castle was commented on. It was not excavated by scholars until 1965, when it was confirmed to date to the late 7th and early 8th centuries.

The site is roughly rectangular, with a large moat surrounding it and a river flowing through the middle, dividing the rectangle into northern and southern sectors. The southern sector was dominated by the ruins of warehouse buildings. These warehouses were originally built in a stilt pillar-style with the pillar buried directly into the ground but were completely rebuilt during the end of the 7th and early 8th centuries to use foundation stones and tiled roofs. Six of these warehouses were orientated north–south and three were orientated east–west. It is believed that these warehouses were for storing rice, which was paid as taxes, from the large amount of burned rice recovered from the area. The northern sector of the enclosure had many buildings with foundation stones which were laid out in an east–west orientation. The number of building peaked in the first half of the ninth century but burned down in the second half of the ninth century. They were rebuilt in the early 10th century but were abandoned later in the same century.

The site is approximately 10 minutes by car from Izumizaki Station on the JR East Tōhoku Main Line.

=== Kariyado temple ruins ===
The Kariyado temple ruins (借宿廃寺跡, Kariyado Haji ato) are also located on a river terrace on the right bank of the Abukuma River, about 1.5 km southwest of the ruins of Sekiwahisa Kanga complex. The Shirakawa Fudoki, a history chronicle compiled in the Edo period mentions existence of old roof tiles and the existence of about ten foundation stones at this site, and it was examined before World War II. by Tōhoku University. The site was excavated from 2003 to 2008, and the foundations of the Pagoda, Kondō and Lecture Hall were discovered. The layout was in the "Horyuji-style" with the pagoda to the west and the Kondō to the east. Such temples were associated with a government administrative complex from the end of the 7th century. The ruins were added to the National Historic Site designation in 2010.

The temple ruins are approximately 15 minutes by car from Kutano Station on the Tōhoku Main Line. The site was backfilled after excavation, and there is now nothing visible in situ.

== See also ==
- List of Historic Sites of Japan (Fukushima)
- Negishi Kanga ruins
- Izumi Kanga ruins
