= Miyahata Site =

Archeological site in Fukushima, Japan

Miyahata ruins
- 宮畑遺跡 (Japanese)
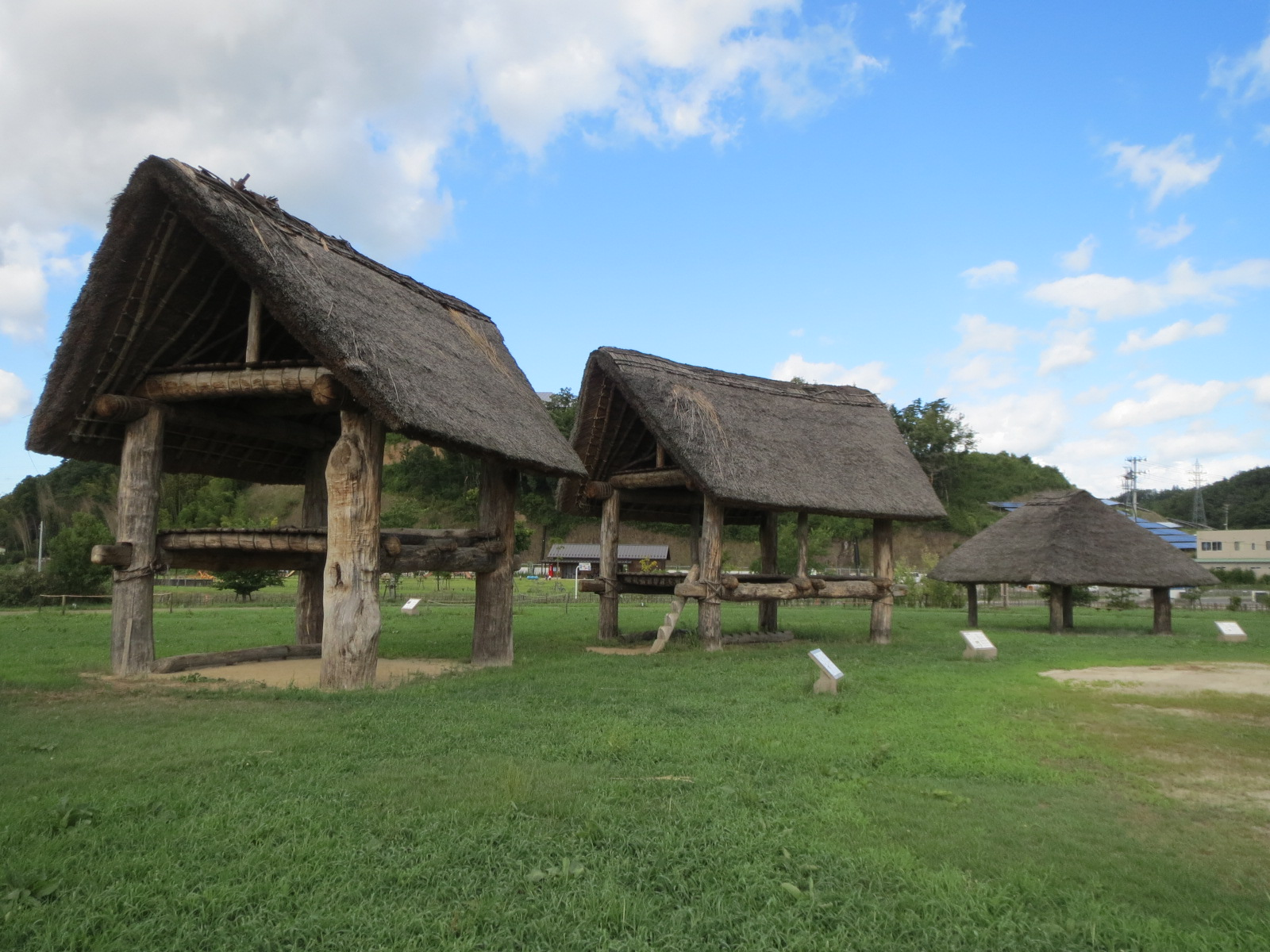
- Miyahata ruins

- Miyahata ruins Miyahata Site (Japan)
- 37°47′24″N 140°30′55″E
- Type: settlement
- Periods: Jōmon period
- Location: Fukushima (city), Japan
- Region: Tōhoku region

History
- Built: 2500 BC - 1000 BC

Site notes
- Excavation dates: 1998
- Public access: Yes (park and museum)

Miyahata ruins (宮畑遺跡, Miyahata iseki) is an archaeological site and archaeological park located in what is now part of the city of Fukushima, Fukushima Prefecture in the Tōhoku region of Japan with the ruins of a Jōmon period settlement. The site was designated a National Historic Site of Japan in 2003.

== Overview ==
The Miyahata ruins contains the overlapping ruins of a settlement from existed from the middle Jōmon period (4500–4000 years ago), late Jōmon period (4000–3000 years ago) to the final Jōmon period (3000–2500 years ago). It is located on the left bank of the Abukuma River, on a river terrace with an altitude of about 60 meters. From 1997, several rescue archaeology excavations were made during the construction of the nearby Fukushima Industrial Park, revealing many remains, including the ruins of a burnt-down dwelling house from the middle Jōmon period and other dwellings from the late Jōmon period. As a result of a survey conducted from 1998, it became protected from development as a National Historic Site.

The middle Jōmon period ruins consist of over 40 pit dwellings, of which over half appear to have been destroyed at the same time in a fire.

The late Jōmon period ruins consist of pit dwellings with stone cobblestone floors in a style more often found the in Kantō region of Japan. Pottery fragments also consistent with the Kantō region, including some pottery burial jars were also uncovered. As these ruins are not contiguous with in time with the middle Jōmon period ruins, it appears that the village was abandoned after its conflagration, and resettled by migrants from another region of Japan.

The final Jōmon period ruins consist of raised floor buildings arranged unevenly around a roughly square plaza measuring 45 meters east–west by 60 meters north–south. One of the buildings was a rectangular structure with gigantic columns with a diameter of 90-cm, which is presumed to have been used for some ritual purpose. Earthenware and stoneware were excavated in large quantities, and many religious relics such as clay figurines.

The site is open to the public as an archaeological park with several reconstructed buildings and a museum. It is located approximately 10 minutes by car from Senoue Station on the Abukuma Express Line.

== See also ==
- List of Historic Sites of Japan (Fukushima)
