= Yanagawa Castle (Fukushima) =

- 梁川城
- Date, Fukushima Japan
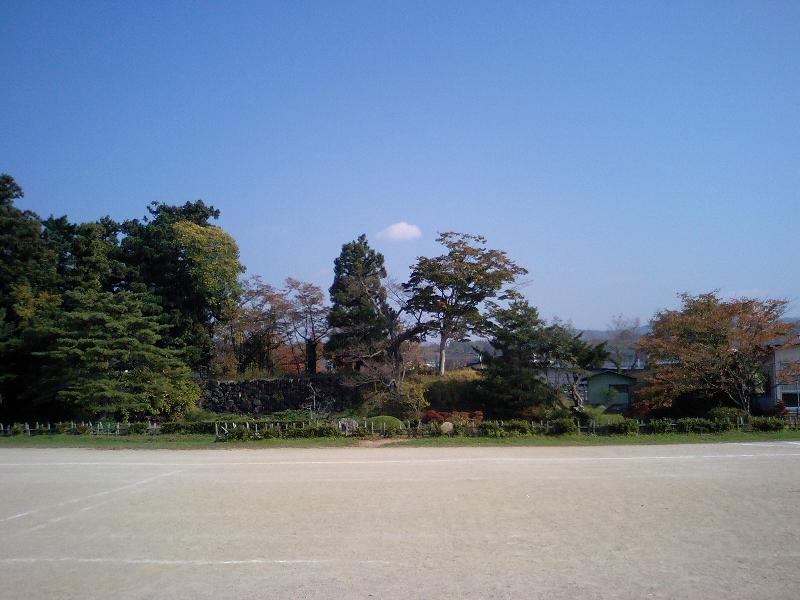
- Yanagawa Castle site

Site information
- Type: yamajiro-style Japanese castle
- Controlled by: Date clan, Uesugi clan
- Open to the public: yes
- Condition: Archaeological and designated national historical site; castle ruins

Location
- Coordinates: 37°51′18.68″N 140°36′40.72″E

Site history
- In use: Kamakura to Edo period
- National Historic Site of Japan

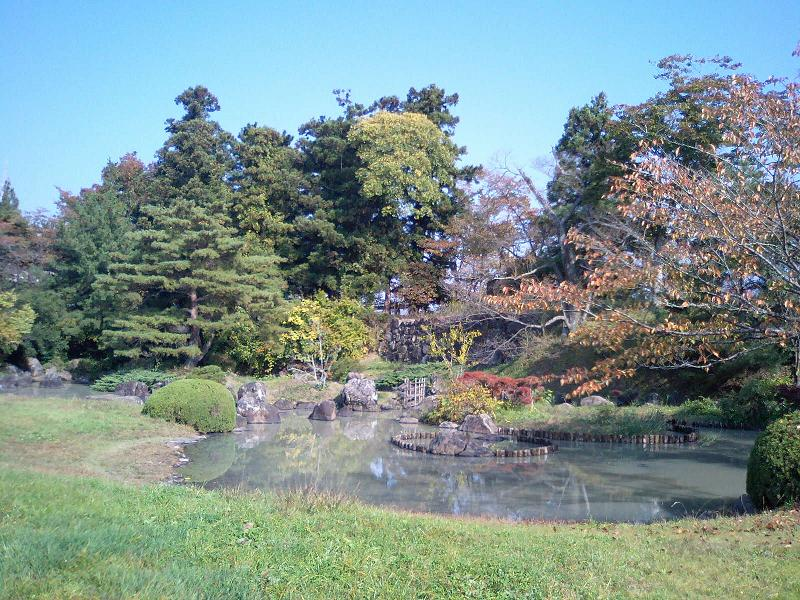
Restored medieval garden of Yanagawa Castle

Yanagawa Castle (梁川城, Yanagawa-jō) was a Sengoku period hirayama-style Japanese castle located in the Yanagawa neighborhood of the city of Date, Fukushima Prefecture, Japan. Its ruins have been protected as a National Historic Site since 2019.

== Overview ==
Yanagawa Castle was built on a hill that juts out in a west-northwest direction from Chausuyama on the east side of the Yanagawa city center, and the elevation difference from the flat land of the castle town is only about 10 meters. On the north side of Yanagawa Castle are a moat and enclosure, on the west side is a steep terrace slope, on the south side is a cliff created by the erosion of the Hirose River.

== HIstory ==
It is unknown when a castle was first built on this site. One theory is it was built in 1189 in the early Kamakura period, when the Date clan were awarded this area by Minamoto no Yoritomo for their role in the Invasion of Hiraizumi; however, its first mention in historical documents state are after 1426 during the Muromachi period. On the other hand, the oldest relics unearthed in archaeological excavations on the site are estimated to date back to the time of the third Date clan chieftain, Date Yoshihiro (1185-1256), or the fourth Date clan chieftain, Date Masayori (1227-1301), so it is believed that the castle was built around that time. In any case, it was the base of the Date clan from the Kamakura period onwards, until the 17th chieftain, Date Masamune, was transferred by Toyotomi Hideyoshi. Yanagawa Castle was thus the main stronghold of the Date clan for nearly 300 years, from the time of the fourth chieftain, Date Masayori, until Date Tanemune moved to Kōri-Nishiyama Castle in 1532. Even after the Date clan's main residence was moved to Koori Nishiyama Castle, Yanagawa Castle continued to function as an important base within their domains. The Date clan held the position of Jitō (local steward) of Date County, and later the position of Ōshū tandai, and were the strongest clan in southern Ōshū.

The castle served as Date Masamune's headquarters during first battle was against the Sōma clan. Late, when Masamune married Princess Megohime from the Tamura clan, the bride was handed over to him in Yanagawa. After the Date clan was relocated to Iwadeyama Castle by Toyotomi Hideyoshi, it became the territory of Gamō Ujisato, and after Ujisato's death, it became the territory of Uesugi Kagekatsu. The current remains of Yanagawa Castle are thought to be the work of the castellans from this period. The castle was also the site of the conflict between Date Masamune and Uesugi Kagekatsu in the prelude to the 1600 Battle of Sekigahara, in which Masamune attacked Yanagawa Castle from the opposite bank of the Abukuma River, but was unable to dislodge Kagekatsu's forces entrenched inside.

After the Tokugawa shogunate was established, Yanagawa Castle remained in the hands of the Uesugi clan, who completed the Nishinezeki Canal in the Fukushima Basin, dramatically expanding the area of cultivated land. However, in 1664 Uesugi Tsunakatsu died suddenly without a successor. The Uesugi clan avoided attainer by adopting Kira Yoshinaka's eldest son Tsunanori, and Uesugi Domain was reduced from 300,000 koku to 150,000 koku. Date County (including Yanagawa Castle, as well as Shinobu County and Yashiro in Okitama County) was part of the confiscated territory and became a tenryō under direct control of the shogunate. Yanagawa Castle was abandoned at this time. However, parts of the castle, including the yagura turrets in the inner Bailey and northern San-no-maru Bailey, and the castle lord's mansion, were used as a jin'ya for a cadet branch of the Matsudaira clan, who became daimyō of the 30,000 koku Yanagawa Domain from 1683 to 1730. The area reverted to tenryō and from 1807 to 1821 was a 9000 koku hatamoto holding of the Matsumae clan.

Following the Meiji restoration, the castle was abolished and the main Bailey became the site of the Yanagawa Elementary School until 2015. The Yanagawa Junior High School and Fukushima Prefectural Yanagawa High School is located at the site of the Ni-no-maru. The San-no-maru, which surrounds Inner Bailey from the east to the north, was used as the jin'ya during the Edo period, but is now a residential area. The main gate of Yanagawa Castle is now the rear gate of Yanagawa Elementary School. The remains of earthworks and moats, as well as the poorly visible winding roads typical of castle towns, remain at and around Yanagawa Castle, but they are rapidly disappearing due to housing development and redevelopment.

An archaeological excavation was carried out from 1978 to 1981 at the schoolyard of Yanagawa Elementary School, the former site of the main citadel. A medieval garden called "Shinji no Ike" was restored in one corner of the schoolyard. It dates back to the time when the Date clan strengthened its ties with the Muromachi shogunate, and according to one theory, it is the only medieval garden in eastern Japan. In addition, the Fukushima Prefectural Museum in Aizuwakamatsu, Fukushima, has a replica model of Yanagawa Castle on display.

== See also ==
- List of Historic Sites of Japan (Fukushima)

== Literature ==
- Benesch, Oleg and Ran Zwigenberg (2019). Japan's Castles: Citadels of Modernity in War and Peace. Cambridge: Cambridge University Press. p. 374. ISBN 9781108481946.
- De Lange, William (2021). An Encyclopedia of Japanese Castles. Groningen: Toyo Press. pp. 600 pages. ISBN 978-9492722300.
