= Kabutozuka Kofun (Iwaki) =

Burial site in Japan

- 甲塚古墳 (Japanese)
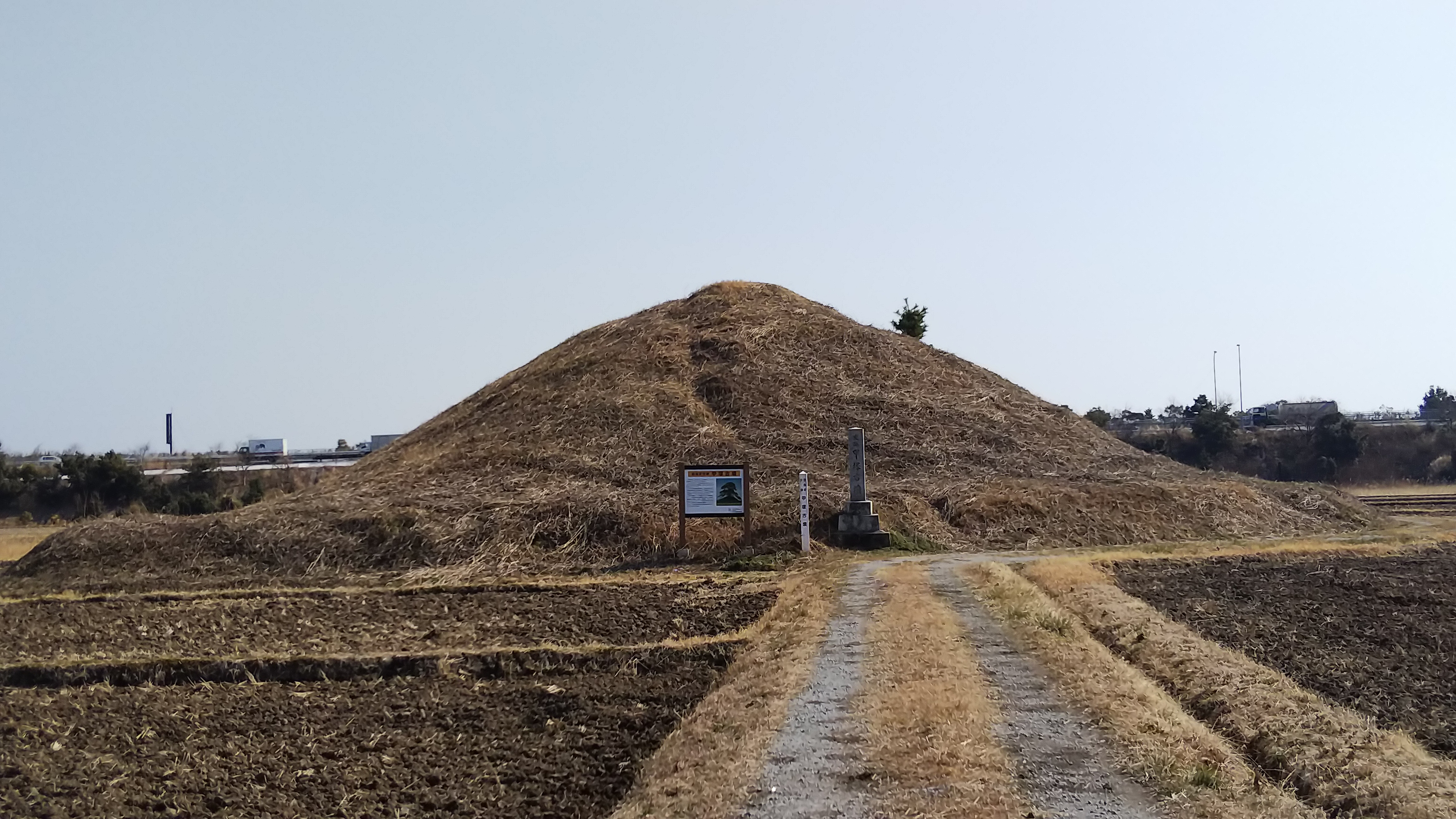
- Kabutozuka Kofun

- Kabutozuka Kofun Kabutozuka Kofun (Iwaki) (Japan)
- 37°3′11.5″N 140°56′30.9″E
- Type: kofun
- Periods: Kofun
- Location: Iwaki, Fukushima, Japan
- Region: Tōhoku region

History
- Built: 5th to 6th century AD

Site notes
- Elevation: 30 m (98 ft)
- Diameter: 37 m (121 ft)
- Public access: Yes (no facilities)

The Kabutozuka Kofun (甲塚古墳, Kabutozuka Kofun) is a kofun burial mound located in what is now the city of Iwaki, in Fukushima Prefecture in the southern Tōhoku region of northern Japan. It has been protected by the central government as a National Historic Site since 1923.

== Overview ==
The kofun is located on flat ground near the mouth of Natsui River, surrounded by rice paddies. The area has a dense concentration of ruins from the Kofun period through the Nara period, and the Kabutoyama Kofun is the only survivor of a cluster of tumuli which were destroyed by local farmers over the years to increase cultivatable land. During the construction of the nearby Japan National Route 6 Bypass, the remains of nine tumuli, along with a large number of cylindrical haniwa, shards of Sue pottery, wooden markers and ritual objects, and other artifacts have been found.

The Kabutozuka Kofun is a well-preserved large empun (円墳)-style megalithic tomb with a diameter of 37 meters and a height of 8.2 meters, taking its name from its resemblance to a kabuto helmet. The tomb has not been excavated, so its internal structure and age is not known, but it is estimated to date from the late 6th to late 7th centuries by the artifacts which we found in the vicinity. This area was near the center of ancient Iwaki county and near the Iwaki county administrative center, so it can be postulated that it was a tomb of the Kuni no miyatsuko of ancient Iwaki Province.

It is located approximately 40 minutes on foot from Kusano Station on the JR East Jōban Line.

== See also ==
- List of Historic Sites of Japan (Fukushima)
