= Atsukashiyama Barrier =

- 阿津賀志山防塁
- Kunimi, Fukushima, Japan
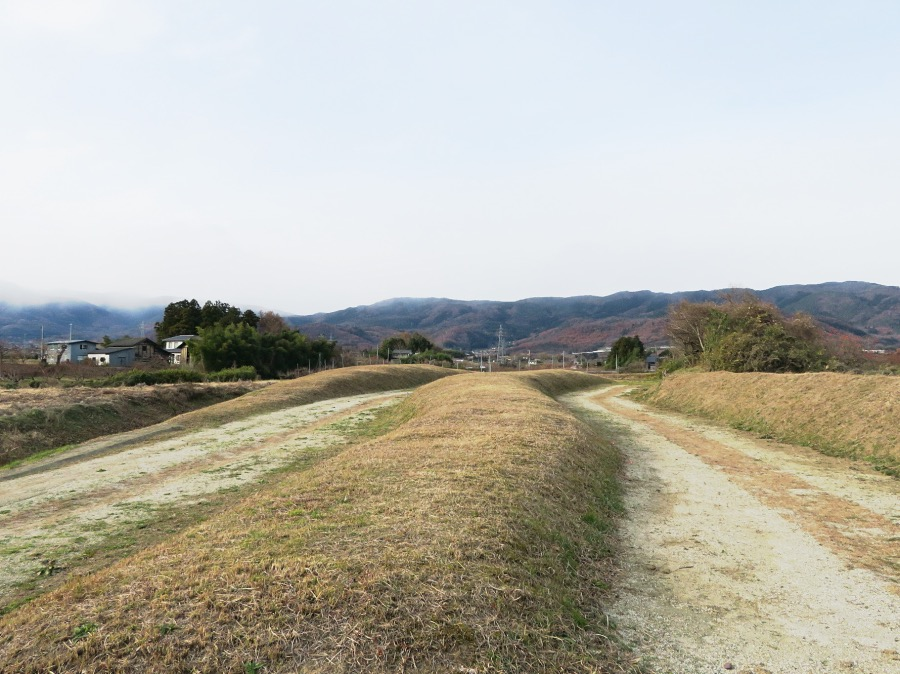
- remnants of ramparts and moats of Atsukashiyama Barrier

Site information
- Type: Fortification line
- Open to the public: Yes (no public facilities)
- Condition: Ruins

Location
- Coordinates: 37°53′17″N 140°33′57″E

Site history
- Built: c.1188
- Built by: Fujiwara no Kunihira
- In use: 1189
- Battles/wars: Battle of Atsukashiyama (1189)

The Atsukashiyama Barrier (阿津賀志山防塁, Atsukashiyama hōrui) was a defensive fortification consisting of embankments and moats, erected in the late Heian period by the Northern Fujiwara in what is now the town of Kunimi, Fukushima in the Tōhoku region of Japan. It was the location of a major battle during the conquest of Hiraizumi by the forces of the Kamakura shogunate in 1189. The site was designated a National Historic Site of Japan in 1981.

== Overview ==
The Atsukashiyama Barrier was a defensive structure built by Fujiwara no Kunihira, the son of Fujiwara no Yasuhira for the purpose of thwarting the invasion of Ōshū by the forces of Minamoto no Yoritomo in 1189. The embankment consisted of a triple set of earthen ramparts, protected by a double set of dry moats, yagura and siege crossbows, which extended for a three-kilometer length between the Atsukashi River and the Atsukashi Mountains. The location was a chokehold on the main route to northern Japan, and was identified by the Northern Fujiwara as critical for the defense of Hiraizumi. Even today the route of Japan National Route 4, the Tōhoku Expressway and the Tōhoku Main Line railway must pass through this gap.

Although one of the largest and most impressive structures of its kind attempted in Japan, Atsukashiyama Barrier only stalled the Minamoto advance for a short period, and Fujiwara Kunihira was killed in the battle.

The site came to scholarly attention during construction work on the Tōhoku Expressway in 1971, although its location was clearly stated in the medieval Azuma Kagami chronicle. Despite the significance of the site, the Fukushima Prefectural government planned a large-scale land improvement project would have effectively destroyed all trace of the ruins. The Fukushima Prefectural Board of Education conducted a rescue archaeology excavation at nine locations along the embankment in 1979, finding numerous artifacts and discovering that the moats had a width of 15 meters, and depth of 1.5 meters in shallow places, and 2.8 meters in deep places. Based on the results of these surveys, the ruins received protection as a National Historic Site in 1981. The site is located approximately 10 minutes by car from Fujita Station on the JR East Tōhoku Main Line.

== See also ==
- List of Historic Sites of Japan (Fukushima)
