= Shirakawa Castle (Shirakawa) =

- 白川城
- Shirakawa, Fukushima Prefecture, Japan
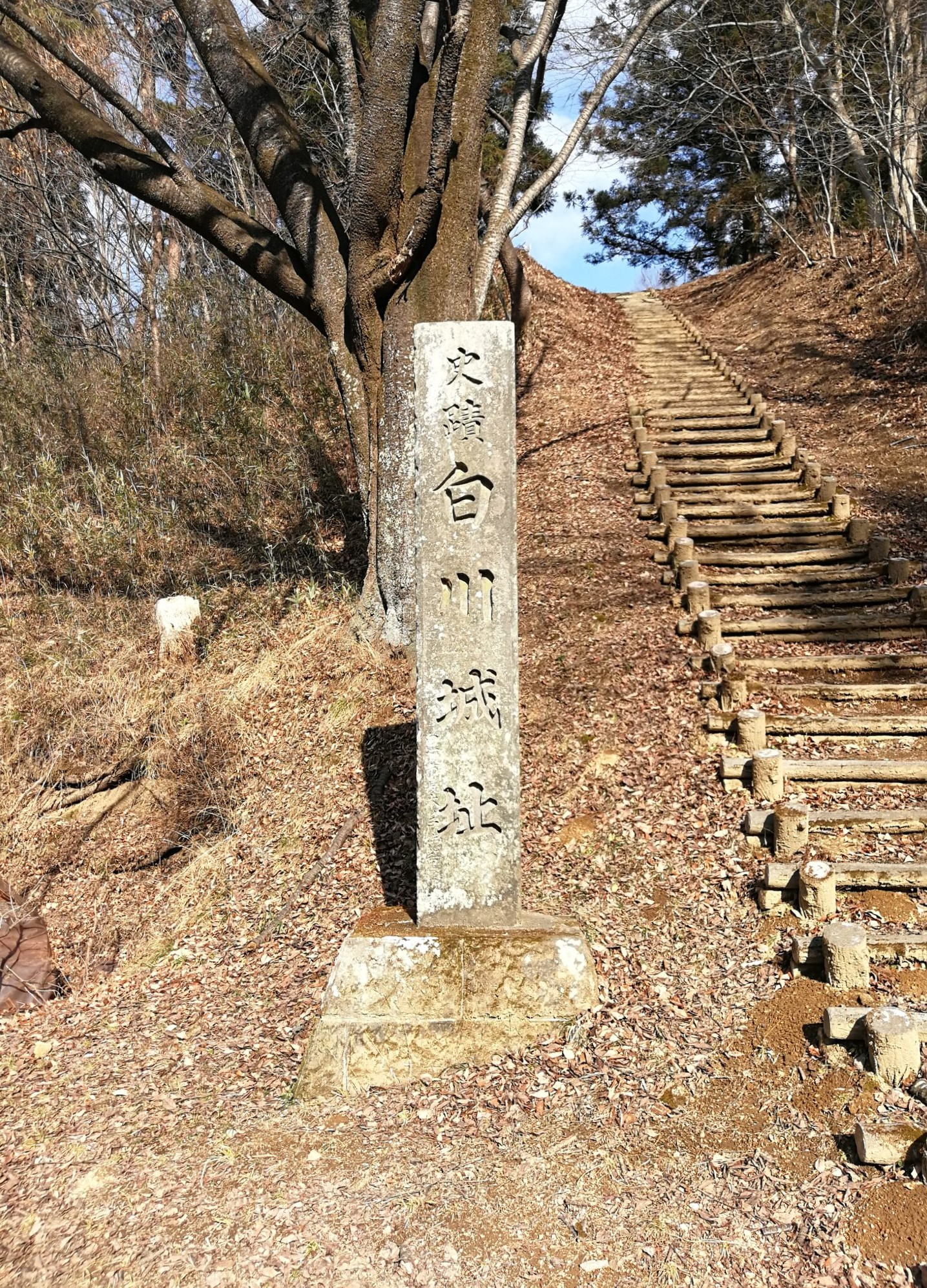
- Yūki-Shirakawa Castle

Site information
- Type: hilltop-style Japanese castle
- Open to the public: yes
- Condition: ruins

Location
- Yūki-Shirakawa Castle Shirakawa Castle (Japan)
- Coordinates: 37°07′35″N 140°12′39″E

Site history
- Built: Kamakura period
- In use: Kamakura to Sengoku period
- Demolished: 1590

Shirakawa Castle (白川城, Shirakawa-jō) was a Sengoku period Japanese castle located in what is now the city of Shirakawa, northern Fukushima Prefecture, Japan. It should not be confused with the later "Shirakawa Castle" of the Edo period, which was more properly known as Komine Castle. The old Shirakawa Castle was also known as Karame-jō (搦目城) or Yūki-Shirakawa-jō (結城白川城). The castle site was granted government protection as a National Historic Site of Japan in 2016.

== Situation ==
Shirakawa Castle is located about 2 kilometers southeast of the center of Shirakawa City, on the right bank of the Abukuma River. It is built on a 400-meter elevation mountain ridge, extending about 950 meters east–west by 550 meters north–south. As was common with mountain castles of the time, the fortifications consisted of number of separate enclosures on the mountain, individually protected by clay ramparts and dry moats.

== History ==
The Yūki clan was originally a local samurai band from Shimotsuke Province. Minamoto no Yoritomo's wet nurse was a woman from the Yūki clan, and after the formation of the Kamakura shogunate, the Yūki clan assisted in his many battles and were awarded many estates, including a shōen in the Shirakawa area. The cadet branch of the family who settled in Shirakawa built Karame Castle as their main base, and Komine Castle as a branch. By the end of the 15th century, the clan controlled a large territory in southern Mutsu Province and Shimotsuke Province. However, into the Sengoku period, the Shirakawa-Yūki came into conflict with the Komine-Yūki, and also came under attack from their powerful and aggressive neighbors, the Ashina clan and the Satake clan. To make matters worse, they failed to submit to Toyotomi Hideyoshi at the time for the 1590 Battle of Odawara and were dispossessed, becoming vassals of the Date clan. Shirakawa Castle was abandoned around that time.

The ruins of the castle were partially excavated from 2010 to 2015 by the Shirakawa City Board of Education, and remains and artifacts from the 14th to 16th centuries were identified, leading to its National Historic Site designation in 2016.

== See also ==
- List of Historic Sites of Japan (Fukushima)

== Literature ==
- Schmorleitz, Morton S. (1974). Castles in Japan. Tokyo: Charles E. Tuttle Co. pp. 144–145. ISBN 0-8048-1102-4.
- Motoo, Hinago (1986). Japanese Castles. Tokyo: Kodansha. p. 200 pages. ISBN 0-87011-766-1.
- Turnbull, Stephen (2003). Japanese Castles 1540-1640. Osprey Publishing. p. 64 pages. ISBN 1-84176-429-9.
