= Aizu Matsudaira clan cemetery =

Historic sites in Fukushima Prefecture, Japan

Aizu-Matsudaira clan cemetery
- 会津藩主松平家墓所
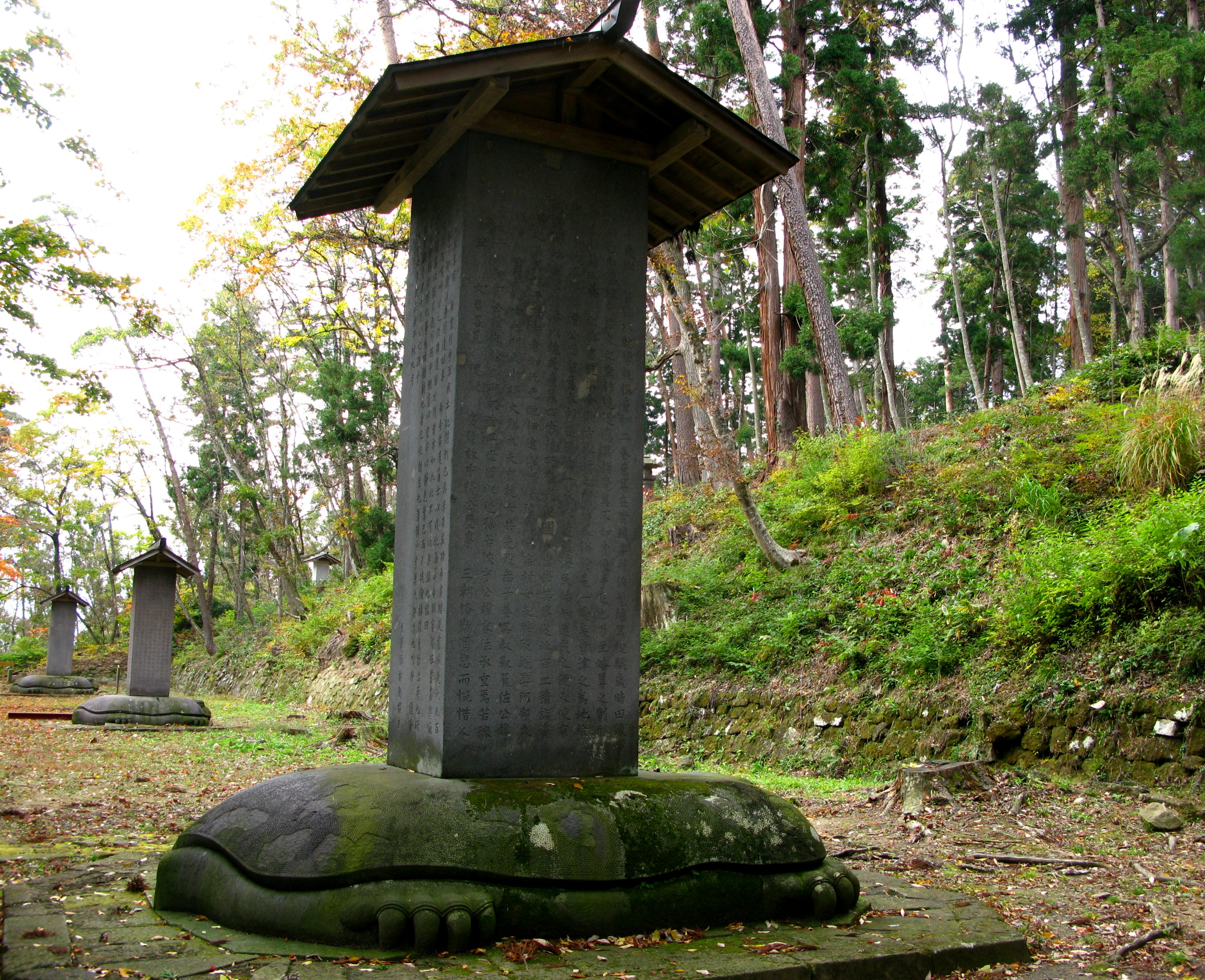
- Aizu-Matsudaira clan cemetery
- Interactive map of Aizu-Matsudaira clan cemetery

Details
- Established: 1657
- Location: Aizuwakamatsu, Inawashiro, Fukushima
- Country: Japan
- Type: daimyō cemetery
- Website: Official website
- Footnotes: National Historic Site of Japan
- Aizu Matsudaira clan cemetery (Fukushima Prefecture) Aizu Matsudaira clan cemetery (Japan)

The Aizu Domain Matsudaira clan cemetery (会津藩主松平家墓所, Aizu-han-shu Matsudaira-ke bosho) is located in two locations. One is in the city of Aizuwakamatsu, Fukushima, and the second is in the town of Inawashiro, Fukushima Japan. The cemetery contains the graves of the successive daimyō of Aizu Domain. The cemeteries were collectively designated a National Historic Site in 1987.

== Overview ==
The Hoshina clan had been senior retainers of the Takeda clan and in Hoshina Masamitsu adopted the illegitimate son of the second Tokugawa shōgun Tokugawa Hidetada. Named Hoshina Masayuki, he became daimyō of Aizu Domain, with a nominal kokudaka of 240,000 koku. After his half-brother, Tokugawa Iemitsu died, Hoshina Masayuki acted as regent for his successor, the underage fourth shōgun Tokugawa Ietsuna. The clan was later permitted to use the "Matsudaira" surname and to family crest. However, the direct line of descent from Hoshina Masayuki died out with the death of the 7th daimyō of Aizu, Matsudaira Katahiro in 1822.

The grave of Hoshina Masayuki is located in Inawashiro within the grounds of Onitsu Jinja (土津神社), a Shinto shrine. The stone monument is 7.3 meters tall, and is inscribed with his biography in the calligraphy of Yamazaki Ansai. Masayuki was a fervent follower of Shintoism, and this shrine was established in 1675 two years before Masayuki's death to be his final resting place and as a subsidiary shrine to the kami of Mount Bandai. Although the Tokugawa shogunate had decreed that all funeral rites were to be held per Buddhist rituals, the Aizu-Wakamatsu clan remained an exception throughout its existence. The honden of the Onitsu Jinja was originally in the flamboyant Mooyama style, similar to the Nikkō Tōshō-gū, but it was burned down during the Boshin War.

The graves of his successors, from the 2nd daimyō, Hoshina Masatsune to the 9th daimyō, Matsudaira Katamori are located in a forest near the Higashiyama Onsen district of Aizu-Wakamatsu. With the except of Hoshina Masatsune, who was buried per Buddhist rites, all of the daimyō of Aizu were buried per Shinto rites. Each grave has a turtle-shaped pedestal monument in the front, votive Tōrō stone lanterns, and an octagonal stone crypt, with a small earthen mound. Among the various daimyō cemeteries, it was noted for the size of its tombs and landscaped setting. In addition to the successive daimyō, there are also many tombs for family and descendants, and a hall of worship.

The tombs were owned by the Aizu-Matsudaira family until 2001, when they were transferred to the city of Aizuwakamatsu for historic site environmental maintenance.

== See also ==
- List of Historic Sites of Japan (Fukushima)
