= Ayutaki Ferry Site =

Ferry crossing in Fukushima, Japan listed as historical

- 鮎滝渡船場跡 (Japanese)
- Ayutaki Ferry Site Ayutaki Ferry Site (Japan)
- 37°41′04″N 140°29′53″E
- Periods: Edo period
- Location: Fukushima, Fukushima, Japan
- Region: Tōhoku region

Site notes
- Public access: Yes (No public facilities)

The Ayutaki Ferry Site (鮎滝渡船場跡, Ayutaki tosenba ato) is the location of a ferry crossing used in Edo period Japan, located in what is now part of the city of Fukushima, Fukushima Prefecture in the Tōhoku region of Japan. The site was designated a National Historic Site of Japan in 1937.

== Overview ==
During the Edo period, the ruling Tokugawa shogunate forbid the construction of many bridges for defensive reasons, and travelers even on major highways were forced to resort to fording rivers on foot or on the backs of bearers during periods of low water, or use small boats which could ferry a few travelers at a time. The Ayutaki ferry was such a ferry crossing the Abukuma River, which divided Date District from Shinobu District in southern Mutsu Province. Aside from commercial travelers, the ferry and was used by the sankin-kōtai processions of many of the daimyō of the northern domains en route to-and-from Edo. The ferry was abolished in 1875 with the construction of a bridge over the river by the new Meiji government.

The paving stones that go down to the site of a pier at the riverbank, and stone holes for mooring poles at three locations (depending on the height of the river) are well preserved.

The site is located approximately 20 minutes by car from Kanayagawa Station on the JR East Tōhoku Main Line.

== See also ==
- List of Historic Sites of Japan (Fukushima)
