= Wadai Site =

Archeological site in Fukushima, Japan

Wadai ruins
- 和台遺跡 (Japanese)
- Wadai ruins Wadai Site (Japan)
- 37°39′02″N 140°31′45″E
- Type: settlement
- Periods: Jōmon period
- Location: Fukushima, Fukushima, Japan
- Region: Tōhoku region

Site notes
- Public access: Yes

Wadai ruins (和台遺跡, Wadai iseki) is an archaeological site with the ruins of a Jōmon period settlement, located in what is now part of the city of Fukushima, Fukushima Prefecture in the Tōhoku region of Japan. The site was designated a National Historic Site of Japan in 2006.

== Overview ==
The Wadai ruins date from the middle Jōmon period (4500–4000 years ago), and are located on an elevated plateau with an altitude of 195 meters, in the former town of Iino, Fukushima, sandwiched between the Abukuma River and the Megami River. The site was excavated during construction work on the Fukushima Prefectural Route No. 39 highway, but after the survey was completed, the highway was rerouted to a tunnel in order to protect the ruins.

The site was found to contain the ruins of over 230 pit dwellings and stilt-pillar buildings surrounding circular plaza, making it one of the largest Jōmon settlement sites to have been discovered in Fukushima. Most of the pit dwelling had storage pits, but numerous grave pits were also found. Numerous pottery fragments have been discovered including an earthenware statue of a human body (head, body, limbs) and pottery with textile patterns and containing hunting scenes. Anthropomorphic Jōmon pottery was common in far northern Japan and Hokkaido, but had never been found so far south before this find. Daily utensils made from bone, stone and animal horn have been uncovered, as well as artifacts made from obsidian and oceanic fish bones from the Kantō, Hokuriku and Chūbu regions, indicating long distance trade in the Jōmon period.

The settlement appears to have been inhabited for approximately 200 years, but then was abandoned for unknown reasons. Another mystery about the site is that although pottery shards were very numerous, there was no trace of any clay mining or pottery firing.

The site was backfilled after excavation, and is marked with a stone monument. It is located about 16 minutes by car from Matsukawa Station on the JR East Tōhoku Main Line.

== See also ==
- List of Historic Sites of Japan (Fukushima)
