= Kashiwagi Castle =

- 柏木城
- Kitashiobara, Fukushima Prefecture, Japan

Site information
- Type: flatland-style Japanese castle
- Open to the public: yes
- Condition: Ruins

Location
- Coordinates: 37°39′58″N 139°58′36″E

Site history
- Built: Sengoku period
- Built by: Ashina clan
- In use: Sengoku period
- Demolished: 1589
- National Historic Site of Japan

Kashiwagi Castle (柏木城, Kashiwagi-jō) was a yamajiro-style Japanese castle located in the village of Kitashiobara, Yama District, Fukushima Prefecture, in the southern part of the Tōhoku region of Japan. The ruins were designated a National Historic Site in 2022.

== Location ==
The ruins of Kashiwagi Castle are located on a 512-meter high hill overlooking the northern edge of the Aizu Basin. Built by the Ashina clan during the Sengoku period, the castle overlooks the historic Yonezawa Kaidō highway to the north. This highway connects Aizu in Ōshū with Yonezawa in Ushū.

== History ==
Oshio, where the castle is located, is known to have been a defensive base against invasions into Aizu by the Date clan, who were based in Yonezawa. The Masamuneki records that the Ashina army barricaded themselves into the castle during Date Masamune's invasion of Aizu in 1585.

The castle was defended by Ashina Moritaka to prevent Date Masamune from invading via the Hibariguchi Pass. Masamune forced his way through the pass, capturing Toyama and Iwayama Castles, but he was unable to take Kashiwagi Castle. However after hearing of the defeat of the Ashina clan at the Battle of Suriagehara in 1589, Ashina retainer Okura Sanpei set fire to the castle and retreated. The castle was never rebuilt, and appears to have been abandoned. Currently, remains of earthworks and moats remain at the castle site, and an information board has been installed at the western foot of the hill it stands on.

== Layout ==
The Kashiwagi Castle ruins cover an area measuring 500 meter east-to-west by 450 meters north-to-south. A distinctive feature of the castle's layout is its strong awareness of the Yonezawa Kaidō road. A large group of curved roads are located on the castle's northern slope facing the highway. A road branching off from the Yonezawa Kaidō and passing on the castle's south side is blocked off for 200 meters by a stonework earthwork with a moat. This suggests that the castle served as a defense against Date armies advancing south along the Yonezawa Kaidō road. It has also been confirmed that the castle employed cutting-edge technology from the Sengoku period, such as the extensive use of stonework and its complex-shaped gates.

Kashiwagi Castle is a rare example of a Sengoku period mountain castle in the Tohoku region with stonework, as earthen ramparts were the norm in the area. Archaeological excavations revealed stonework on the walls dividing the main enclosure, forming the inside of the earthworks built around the enclosures, and even in the passageways and entrances.. Considering the current distribution of stone rows remaining , it is estimated that stonework was used throughout almost the entire interior of the fortification. Almost all of the stones used appear to be andesite, likely derived from the eruptions of Mount Okuni and Mount Nekoma.

== Access ==
The castle site is approximately 12 kilometers east of Kitakata Station on the JR East Ban'etsu West Line.

== See also ==
- List of Historic Sites of Japan (Fukushima)

== Literature ==
- Schmorleitz, Morton S. (1974). Castles in Japan. Tokyo: Charles E. Tuttle Co. pp. 144–145. ISBN 0-8048-1102-4.
- Motoo, Hinago (1986). Japanese Castles. Tokyo: Kodansha. p. 200 pages. ISBN 0-87011-766-1.
- Turnbull, Stephen (2003). Japanese Castles 1540-1640. Osprey Publishing. p. 64 pages. ISBN 1-84176-429-9.
