= Negishi Kanga ruins =

Archaeological site in Japan

- 根岸官衙遺跡群 (Japanese)
- Negishi Kanga ruins Negishi Kanga ruins (Japan)
- 37°02′46″N 140°57′23″E
- Location: Iwaki, Fukushima, Japan
- Region: Tōhoku region

History
- Built: 7th - 9th century AD

Site notes
- Public access: Yes (no public facilities)

Negishi Kanga ruins (根岸官衙遺跡群, Negishi kanga iseki-gun) is an archaeological site with the ruins of a Heian period local government administrative complex and Buddhist temple, built over a Jōmon period settlement, located in what is now part of the city of Iwaki, Fukushima prefecture in the southern Tōhoku region of northern Honshu, Japan. It has been protected by the central government as a National Historic Site since 2005.

== Background ==
In the Nara period, after the establishment of a centralized government under the Ritsuryō system, five districts of southern Mutsu Province: Iwaki (石城), Shineha (標葉), Namekata (行方), Uta (宇太), Watari (曰理) and one district of Hitachi Province, Kikuta (菊多) were joined together to form the new province of Iwaki (石城国) in 718. The province only lasted for a short period, and was absorbed back into Mutsu in 720 or 724. This site is believed to have been the location of the civil administration of Iwaki Province, and subsequently of Iwaki District within Mutsu Province in the early Heian period

== Description ==
The Negishi ruins are located in a hilly area very close to the Pacific Ocean to the east. Within the borders of the National Historic Site designation is the site of a hilltop Jōmon period settlement with numerous pit dwellings. To the west of this settlement (and outside the borders of the National Historic Site) is a shell midden contemporary with the settlement, from which numerous shards of Jōmon period pottery, tools and other artifacts have been recovered. The site of the later regional government administrative complex is located on flat land to the northeast of this settlement. The site measures 600 meters north-south and 300 meters east-west, and contained a large administrative building, flanked by buildings in symmetrical positions in the east and west, forming a “U”-shape. The compound was protected by a wooden palisade. This arrangement was common to Nara period and Heian period county administrative complexes in other parts of the country. It is estimated that this complex was in use from the latter half of the 7th century to the 9th century. To the west and to the southwest of this complex are two large areas with the foundation stones for numerous warehouses, which were used for storing taxation grains. In between these two areas was a valley used as a midden in the Nara and Heian periods. A large number of relics such as wooden tags, wooden products, and pottery were excavated.

To the south of the southern warehouse area are the ruins of large-scale pit dwellings and square-walled standing pillar buildings, the largest of which has side 10 meters in length. These ruins date from around the 7th century to the 8th century and are thus contemporary with the government buildings complex. It is assumed that this was the residence of the local ruler of the area.

To the northwest of the government offices complex is the ruins of a large Buddhist temple, Natsui temple ruins (夏井廃寺跡, Natsui haji). The foundations of the Pagoda, Kondō and Lecture Hall, and Inner Gate have been discovered. The temple layout is in the standard layout for a provincial temple, as established in each of the provinces of Japan by Emperor Shōmu during the Nara period (710 – 794).

== See also ==
- Izumi Kanga ruins
- Shirakawa Kanga ruins
- List of Historic Sites of Japan (Fukushima)
