= Takizawa Honjin =

- 旧滝沢本陣
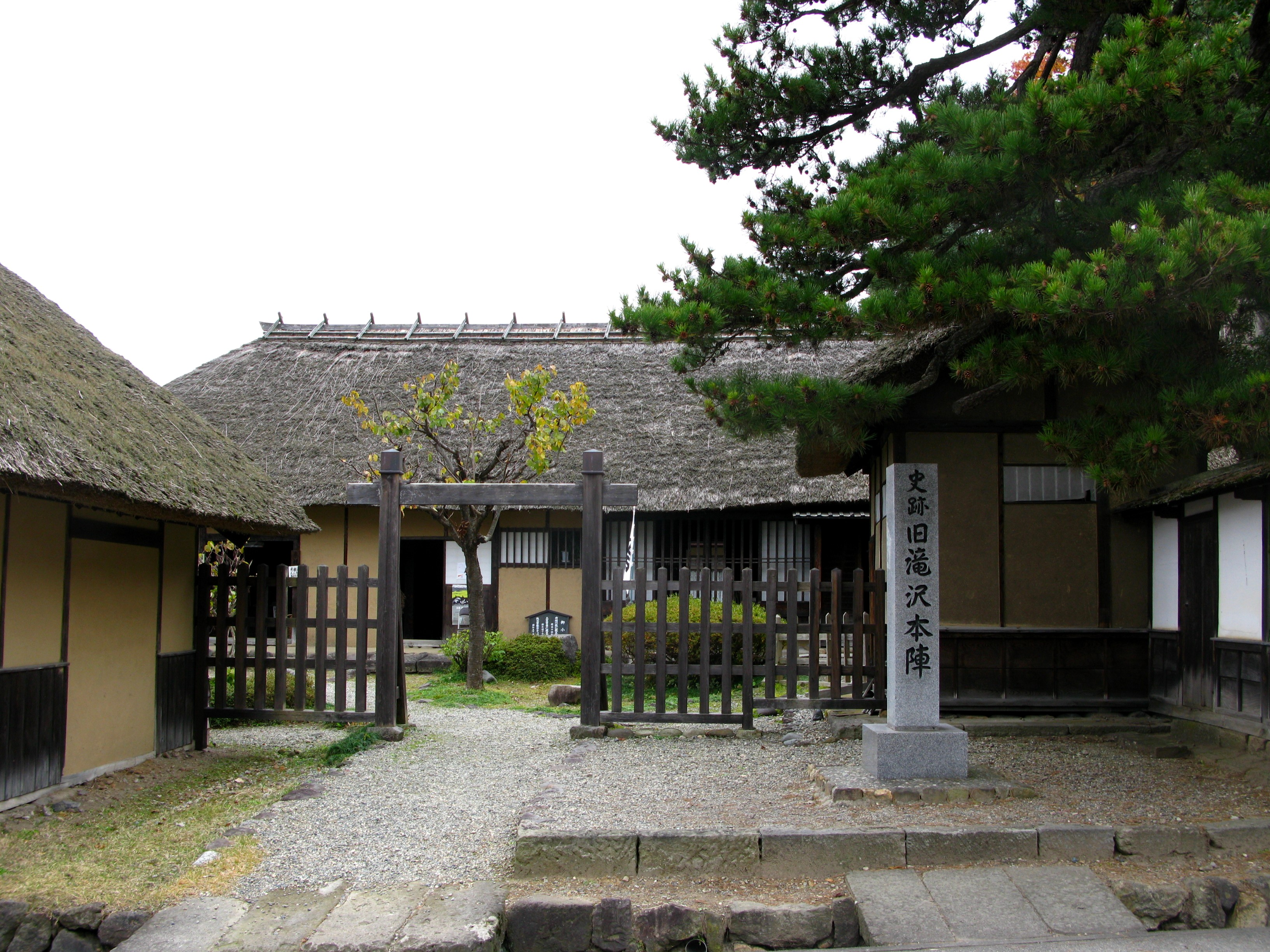
- The Former Takizawa Honjin is an Important Cultural Property

- Location within Fukushima Prefecture Location within Japan

General information
- Location: Aizuwakamatsu, Fukushima Prefecture, Japan
- Coordinates: 37°30′23″N 139°57′10″E
- Opened: 1678
- Renovated: 1751-1829
- Owner: Niigata City

The Takizawa Honjin (旧滝沢本陣, kyū-Takizawa honjin) is a building in the city of Aizuwakamatsu, Fukushima, Japan which was used as a honjin by the daimyō of Aizu Domain during the Edo period. The building was designated an Important Cultural Property of Japan in 1971 and a National Historic Site of Japan in 1970.

== Overview ==
Aizuwakamatsu Castle and its castle town were connected to Shirakawa and Edo via the Shirakawa Kaidō road, which led out of the Aizu Basin via the Takizawa Pass. In 1678, a shukuba was constructed on the Aizu side of the pass, to all travelers to rest before attempting the steep road across the mountains. This shukuba was used by subsequent daimyō of Aizu Domain on their sankin-kōtai journeys to the Shōgun's court in Edo and during inspection tours around the domain. During the Boshin War, Matsudaira Katamori used the honjin at this shukuba as a field headquarters, and scars from the battle, including sword cuts in beams and bullet holes can still be seen.

The present honjin structure dates from 1678 and was renovated in the late Edo period (1751–1829). It has dimensions of 10.5 meters by 7.4 meters, with a thatched hip-and-gable roof. As was common for farmhouses of the time, half of the floor area has an earthen floor. Following the end of the Edo period, the structure was used as a private residence. It is now open to the public as a museum.

== See also ==
- List of Historic Sites of Japan (Fukushima)
