= Enichi-ji =

Buddhist temple in Fukushima Prefecture, Japan

Enichi-ji 勝常寺
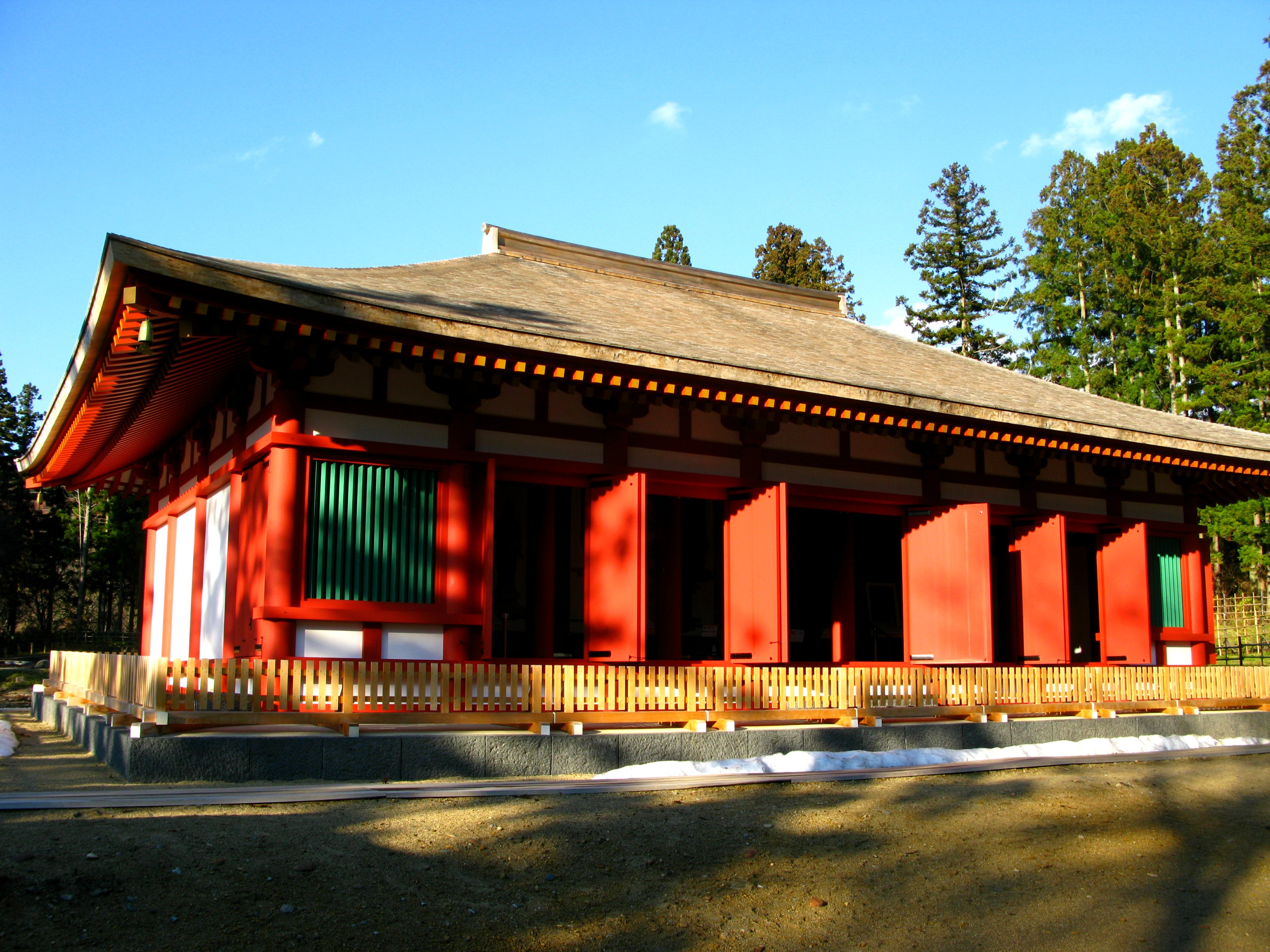
- Kondō of Enichi-ji

- Enichi-ji Enichi-ji (Japan)

Religion
- Affiliation: Buddhist
- Rite: Shingon-shu Buzan-ha

Location
- Location: Bandai, Fukushima Prefecture
- Country: Japan
- Interactive map of Enichi-ji 勝常寺
- Coordinates: 37°34′09″N 139°58′56″E

Architecture
- Founder: Tokuitsu
- Completed: c.807

Enichi-ji (恵日寺) is a Buddhist temple of the Shingon-shu Buzan-ha sect in the town of Bandai, Yama District, Fukushima Prefecture, Japan. The temple was founded in the Heian period as Enichi-ji (慧日寺), and the ruins of its previous incarnation were designated a National Historic Site of Japan in 1970.

== History ==
Enichi-ji was opened in 807 AD by the Hossō sect scholar-monk Tokuitsu, who had come from Nara to spread the faith in the Aizu region. He overcame the followers of the Tendai and Shingon sects to become preeminent in Aizu, and by the time of his death in 842, the temples was a complete shichidō garan with 300 monks in residence, several thousand sōhei and more than 3500 sub-temples. By the late Heian period, the temple had extended its holdings into eastern Echigo province and had established close ties with the Taira clan. During the Genpei War, the temple sent troops in support of the Heike in Shinano Province against Kiso Yoshinaka. However, the temple's leading general, Jōtan-bō, was killed at the 1181 Battle of Yokotagawa by Kiso Yoshinaka's forces, and the temple's forces withdrew and the temple went into decline.

By the Sengoku period, the temple had recovered much of its prosperity, but opposed the forces of Date Masamune after the 1589 Battle of Suriagehara and was almost completely razed, with Masamune sparing only the Kondō. This building also burned down in 1626, and although it was rebuilt, the temple never regained its prosperity, and was destroyed by the post–Meiji restoration Shinbutsu-shūgō policy against Buddhism. It was restored in its present form in 1904 as a Shingon temple.

The temple owns a vajra made from cupronickel which is used as a ritual object in Shingon ceremonies. It was made in the Heian period and is registered as an Important Cultural Property of Japan. It is not kept at the temple, but is normally on display at the museum at Aizuwakamatsu Castle.

The ruins of the temple have been excavated by archaeologists several times, and some of the artifacts uncovered are on display at a museum on the temple grounds.

== See also ==
- List of Historic Sites of Japan (Fukushima)
