= Izumi Kanga ruins =

Archaeological site in Japan

- 泉官衙遺跡 (Japanese)
- Izumi Kanga ruins Izumi Kanga ruins (Japan)
- 37°38′49″N 141°00′58″E
- Location: Minamisōma, Fukushima, Japan
- Region: Tōhoku region

History
- Built: 7th - 10th century AD

Site notes
- Excavation dates: 1994, 2000
- Public access: Yes (no public facilities)

The Izumi Kanga ruins (泉官衙遺跡, Izumi kanga iseki-gun) is an archaeological site with the ruins of a Heian period government office complex located in former Haramachi town in what is now part of the city of Minamisōma, Fukushima prefecture in the southern Tōhoku region of northern Honshu, Japan. It has been protected by the central government as a National Historic Site since 2010.

== Background ==
In the Nara period, after the establishment of a centralized government under the Ritsuryō system, five districts of southern Mutsu Province: Iwaki (石城), Shineha (標葉), Namekata (行方), Uta (宇太), Watari (曰理) and one district of Hitachi Province, Kikuta (菊多) were joined together to form the new province of Iwaki (石城国) in 718. The province only lasted for a short period and was absorbed back into Mutsu in 720 or 724. This site is believed to have been the location of the civil administration of ancient Namekata District in the Heian period.

== Description ==
The Izumi Kanga ruins are located in on a river terrace of the Nitta River on the Abukuma Plateau in far northern Fukushima Prefecture, near the coastline of the Pacific Ocean. The site, which extends over an area one kilometer long east-west, was excavated in the year 1994 and the year 2000. It was found to contain the foundations of a large administrative building, flanked by buildings in symmetrical positions in the east and west, forming a “U”-shape. The compound was protected by a wooden palisade. This arrangement was common to Nara period and Heian period county administrative complexes in other parts of the country. It is estimated that this complex was in use from the latter half of the 7th century to the late 10th century. The buildings were found to have been reconstructed at least three times during this period.

During the first period (from the end of the 7th century to the beginning of the 8th century), the buildings were located near the center of the site and consisted of four stilt-pillar buildings with the pillars buried directly into the ground. The orientation was to the northeast and to the northwest were a number of all-column stilt pillar granaries.

In the second period (early to late 8th century), the main axis direction of the buildings shifted to due north-south. Although the layout remained the same, the main hall had roof tiles and a cobblestone forecourt and stone foundations. The granaries were located to around 240 meters northwest of the government buildings, which were surrounded by separate wall and moat.

In the third period (from the end of the 8th century to the first half of the 10th century), the scale of both the government and the granary area expanded and were connected to the Nitta River directly by a canal. A large quantity of pottery shards, mostly Sue ware and Haji ware and a huge number of roof tiles in various shapes were discovered. The presence of a large amount of carbonized in the granary area indicates that the complex was destroyed by fire around the end of the 10th century.

The site is located approximately 15 minutes by car from the Haranomachi Station on the JR East Jōban Line.

== See also ==
- Negishi Kanga ruins
- Shirakawa Kanga ruins
- List of Historic Sites of Japan (Fukushima)
