= Sanganji shell mound =

- 三貫地貝塚 (Japanese)
- Sanganji kaizuka
- Location in Japan
- 37.844266°N 140.905269°E
- Type: shell mound
- Periods: Neolithic
- Cultures: Late-to-Final Jōmon period
- Location: Shinchi, Fukushima, Japan
- Region: Tōhoku region

History
- Built: 4,000 BP
- Abandoned: 2,500 BP

Site notes
- Excavation dates: 1952–1954

Sanganji shell mound is a Late-to-Final Jōmon shell mound in Shinchi, Fukushima, Tōhoku region, Japan. The shell mound was excavated in 1952 by the Special Committee for Jomon Chronology of the Japanese Archaeological Association and in 1954 by the University of Tokyo Department of Anthropology. The remains of over 40 individuals were excavated from the site. The remains are now housed in The University Museum at the University of Tokyo.

== mtDNA evidence ==
Researchers extracted the DNA from the teeth, dating to around 3000 BP, of four of the human remains excavated from the Sanganji shell mound. Two of the individuals belong to Haplogroup N9b, while the other two belong to Haplogroup M7a2. In comparison to ancient Jomon populations, Haplogroup N9b is found most frequently in Jomon populations from Hokkaido and the Tōhoku region but rare elsewhere in Japan. In comparison to modern populations, Haplogroup N9b is found most frequently among the Udege people, while the haplogroup can also be found in modern Japanese people, albeit at low frequencies. Likewise, Haplogroup M7a2 is found most frequently among the Udege people, while the haplogroup is extremely rare in modern Japan.

== aDNA evidence ==
Researchers performed the first aDNA tests on ancient Jomon samples using three of the Sanganji Jomon individuals tested above. When compared against modern populations, the Sanganji Jomon individuals group most closely with modern East Asians, but are genetically distinct and descended from a population that diverged from other East Asians a long time ago. In comparison to modern populations, the Sanganji Jomon individuals are closest to modern Japanese, showing strongest genetic affinity for the Ainu people, followed by the Ryukyuan people. From this study, researchers estimate that the modern Japanese population inherited less than 20% of their DNA from the ancient Jomon populations.

== Bibliography ==
- Hideaki, Kanzawa-Kiriyama (2013a). Ancient genomic DNA analysis of Jomon people (Ph.D.). Graduate University for Advanced Studies.
- Hideaki, Kanzawa-Kiriyama (2013b). "Ancient mitochondrial DNA sequences of Jomon teeth samples from Sanganji, Tohoku district, Japan" (PDF). Anthropological Science. 121 (2): 89–103. doi:10.1537/ase.121113.
- Hideaki, Kanzawa-Kiriyama; et al. (2016). "A partial nuclear genome of the Jomons who lived 3000 years ago in Fukushima, Japan". Journal of Human Genetics. 62 (2): 213–221. doi:10.1038/jhg.2016.110. PMC 5285490. PMID 27581845.
- Suzuki, Hisashi (1957–1958). "A Prehistoric Human Ilium Penetrated by an Arrow Head". The Journal of Anthropological Society of Nippon. 66 (3): 112–115. doi:10.1537/ase1911.66.112.
