= Kunimi, Fukushima =

Kunimi 国見町
- Town
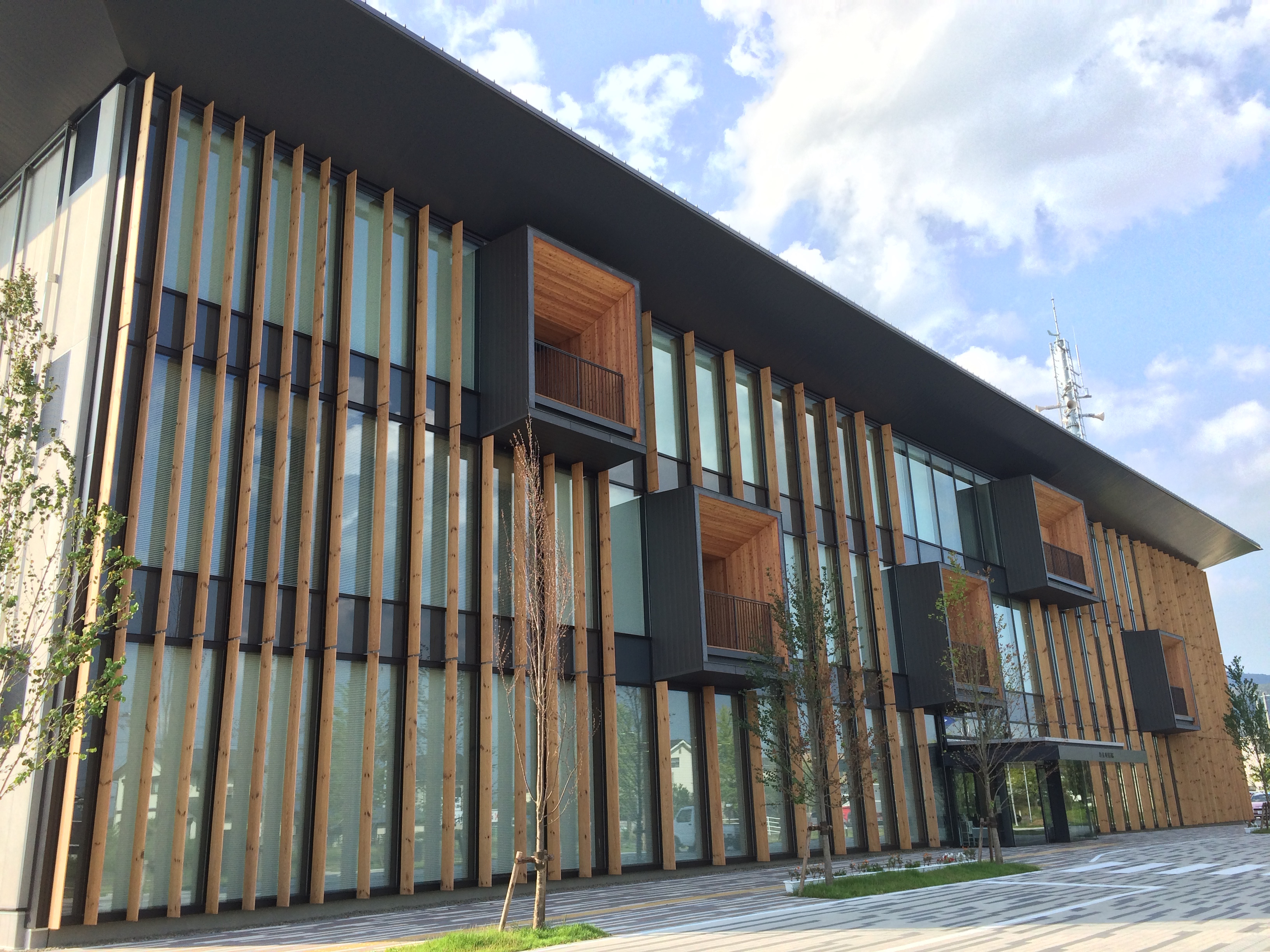
- Kunimi Town Office

- Flag Seal

- Location of Kunimi in Fukushima Prefecture

- Coordinates: 37°52′37″N 140°32′58″E
- Country: Japan
- Region: Tōhoku
- Prefecture: Fukushima
- District: Date

Area
  - Total: 37.95 km^{2} (14.65 sq mi)

Population (January 2020)
  - Total: 8,843
  - Density: 233.0/km^{2} (603.5/sq mi)
- Time zone: UTC+9 (Japan Standard Time)
- Tree: Pinus densiflora
- Flower: Peach
- Bird: Japanese bush warbler
- Phone number: 024-585-2111
- Address: Fujita 2-1 ichodani Kunimi-machi, Date-gun, Fukushima-ken 969-1792
- Website: Official website

Kunimi (国見町, Kunimi-machi) is a town located in Fukushima Prefecture, Japan. As of 1 January 2020, the town had an estimated population of 8843 and a population density of 250 persons per km². The total area of the town was 37.90 square kilometres (14.63 sq mi).

== Geography ==
Kunimi is located in Date District in the very northern portion Fukushima prefecture, bordering on Miyagi prefecture. Mt. Handa and Mt. Ugasu are near the western end of the town, and a continuous mountain range runs along the northern end of the town, which is also the prefectural border with Miyagi Prefecture. The Abukuma River flows south of the town. The town center, where government offices and various types of transportation are concentrated, is relatively close to the border with the neighboring Koori town.

- Mountains: Atsukashiyama (289.4m)
- Rivers: Abukuma River

=== Neighboring municipalities ===
- Fukushima Prefecture
  - Date
  - Koori
- Miyagi Prefecture
  - Shiroishi

== Climate ==
Kunimi has a humid subtropical climate (Köppen climate classification Cfa). The average annual temperature in Kunimi is 12.5 °C (54.5 °F). The average annual rainfall is 1,250 mm (49 in) with September being the wettest month. The temperatures are highest on average in August, at around 25.3 °C (77.5 °F), and lowest in January, at around 1.1 °C (34.0 °F).

== Demographics ==
Per Japanese census data, the population of Kunimi has been in decline over the past 70 years.

Historical population
Year	Pop.	±%
1950	14,430	—
1960	13,111	−9.1%
1970	12,093	−7.8%
1980	12,050	−0.4%
1990	11,888	−1.3%
2000	11,198	−5.8%
2010	10,086	−9.9%
2020	8,639	−14.3%

== History ==
The area of present-day Kunimi was part of ancient Mutsu Province. During the Edo period, it was partly tenryō territory under direct control of the Tokugawa shogunate, and partly under Morioka Domain. The town of Fujita developed as a post station on the Ōshū Kaidō highway. After the Meiji Restoration, it was organized as part of Nakadōri region of Iwaki Province, and Fujita was established as a town on April 1, 1889 with the creation of the modern municipalities system. The town of Kunimi was formed on March 31, 1954 with the merger of the town of Fujita with the villages of Kosaka, Morieno, Okido, and Oeda, all in Date District. The town hall was destroyed in the 2011 Tōhoku earthquake.

== Economy ==
The economy of Kunimi is primarily agricultural.

== Education ==
Kunimi has one public elementary school and one public junior high school operated by the town government. The town does not have a public high school.

- Kunimi Prefectural Middle School
- Kunimi Elementary School

== Transportation ==
=== Railway ===
JR East – Tōhoku Main Line

- Fujita – Kaida

=== Highway ===
- Tōhoku Expressway – Kunimi Interchange – Kunimi Service Area
- National Route 4

== Local attractions ==
- Atsukashiyama Barrier, a National Historic Site
- Ishimotai Castle ruins
- Ishimotai Memorial Stele, a National Historic Site
- Kangetsudai Cultural Center
