= Shiramizu Amidadō =

Buddhist temple in Fukushima Prefecture, Japan

Shiramizu Amida-dō
- 白水阿弥陀堂
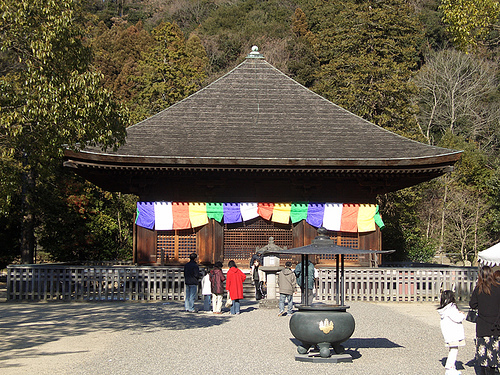
- Amida-dō (1160), a National Treasure

- Location within Fukushima Prefecture Location within Japan

Religion
- Affiliation: Buddhist
- Deity: Amida Nyorai
- Rite: Shingon-shū Chizan-ha
- Status: functional

Location
- Location: 219 Hirobatake, Uchigo Shiramizu-chō, Iwaki-shi, Fukushima-ken
- Country: Japan
- Coordinates: 37°02′11″N 140°50′14″E

Architecture
- Founder: Tokuhime
- Completed: 1160

Website
- Official website

Shiramizu Amida-dō (白水阿弥陀堂), is a chapel located within the Buddhist temple of Ganjō-ji (願成寺) in the city of Iwaki, Fukushima Prefecture, Japan. The Amida-dō is a National Treasure and the temple, with its paradise garden, has been designated an National Historic Site.

== History ==
The temple of Ganjō-ji was built in 1160 by Princess Tokuhime, daughter of Fujiwara no Kiyohira of the Hiraizumi Fujiwara clan, as a memorial temple for her husband, Iwaki Norimichi. The temple was granted imperial status by Emperor Go-Toba, and was protected and patronized by successive daimyo of Iwakitaira Domain under the Tokugawa shogunate in the Edo period. The temple converted at some point from the Pure Land to the Shingon denomination and remains an active temple; however, the Pure Land Garden, including the pond, is now owned and managed by Iwaki City.

The temple was closed to the public due to the damage caused by the 2011 Tōhoku earthquake, but restoration was completed in July 2012 and the temple reopened.

== Buildings ==
- Amida-dō (National Treasure); built in 1160. The building is a square structure with a thatched tented roof consisting of very thin layers of wood shingles. Inside, the walls were once covered with mural paintings, of which only a fragment remains. Along with Mōtsū-ji in Hiraizumi and a structure of Kōzō-ji in Kakuda, Miyagi, it is one of only three surviving structures of the Heian period in the Tōhoku region of Japan. The Amida-do is surrounded by ponds on all three sides: east, west, and south, and there is a worship path from the south.

== Treasures ==
Inside the Amidadō are five statues:

- Wooden Amida Nyōrai triad (Heian period) (Important Cultural Properties)
- Wooden statue of Jikokuten (Heian period) (ICP)
- Wooden statue of Tamonten (Heian period) (ICP)

== Gardens ==
Between 1972 and 1982 archaeological investigations were conducted into the pond, pebble beach, ornamental stones, peninsula, central island, and bridges of the twelfth-century paradise garden.

== Gallery ==
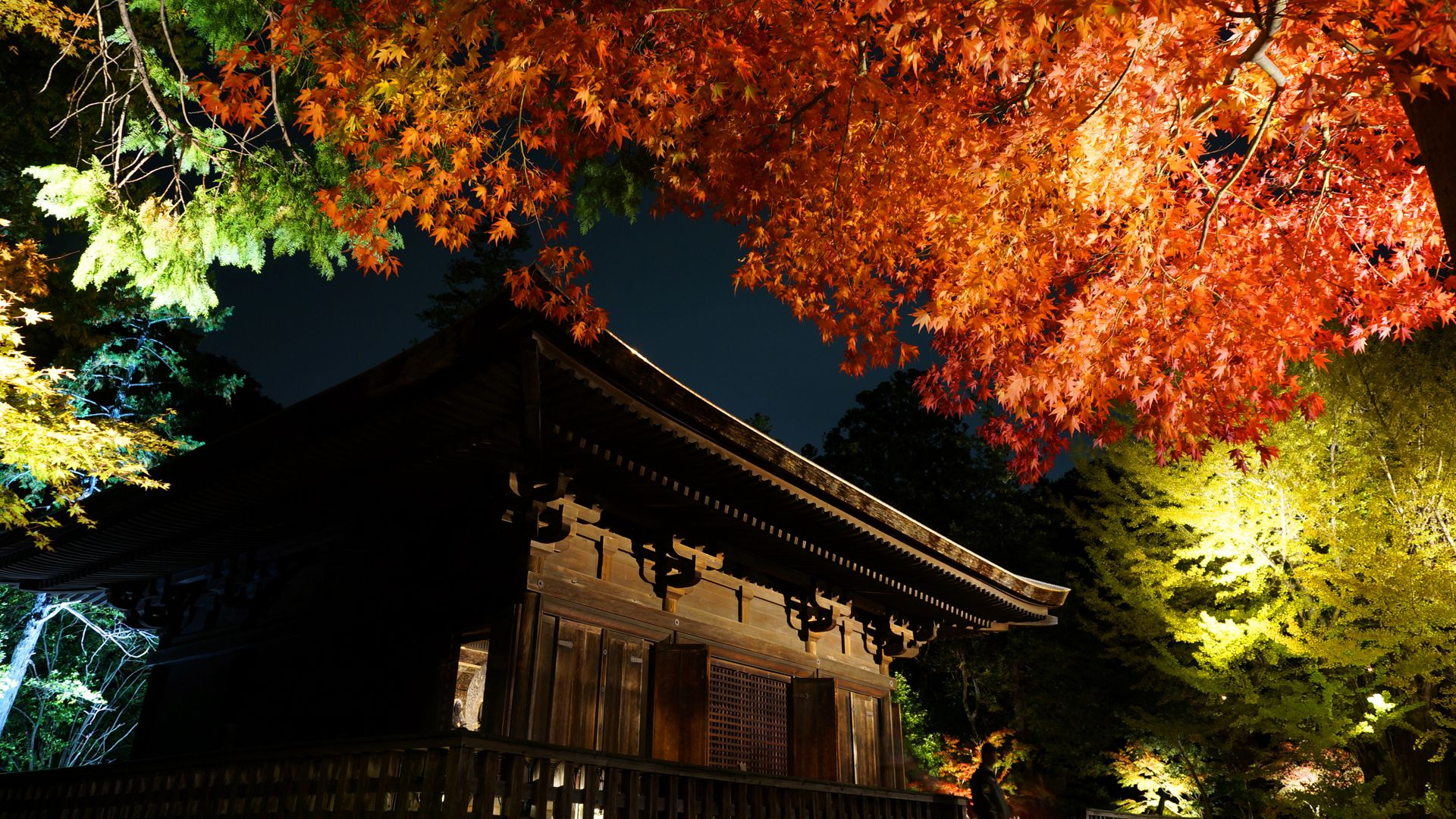
Shiramizu Amida-do Hall

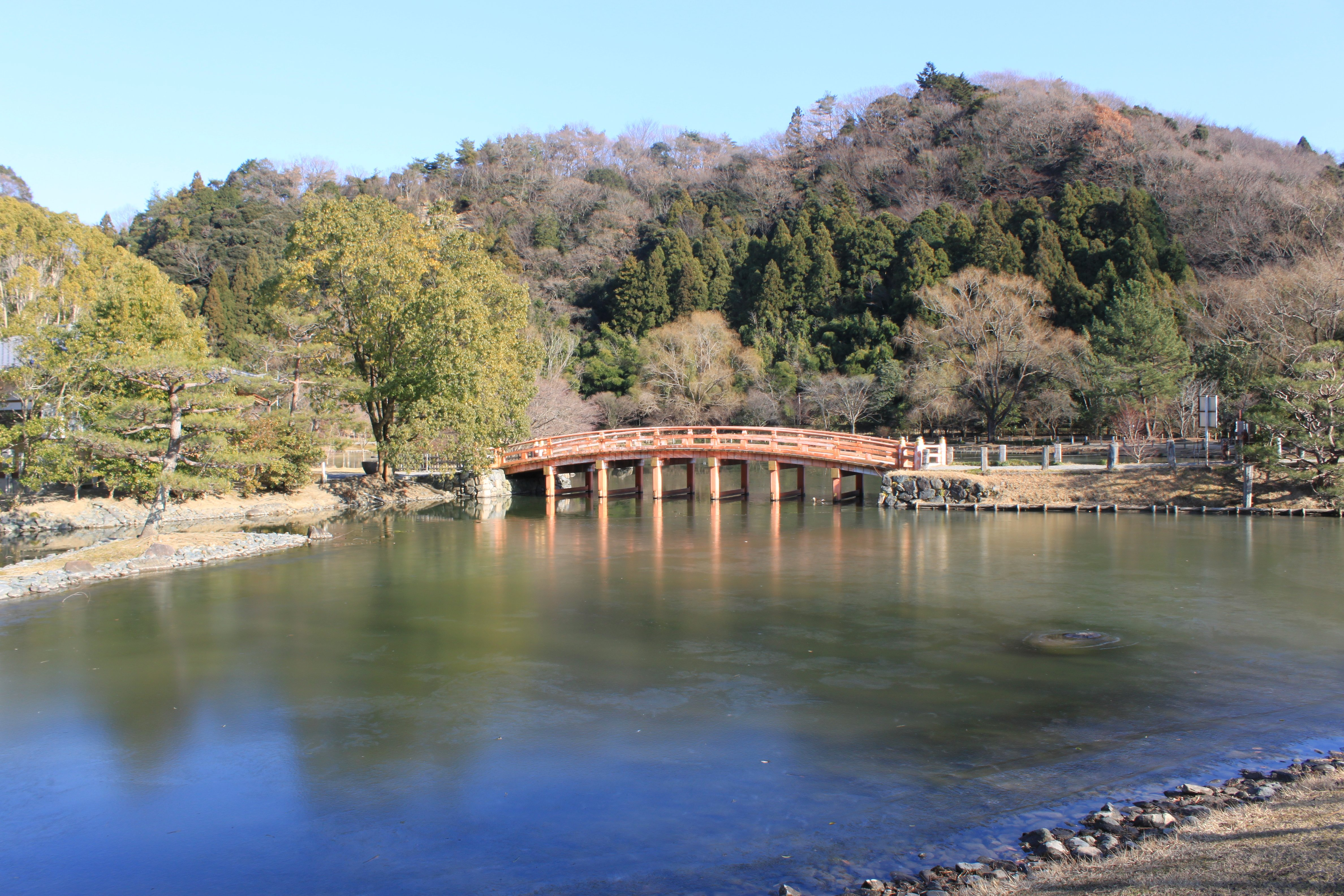
Garden

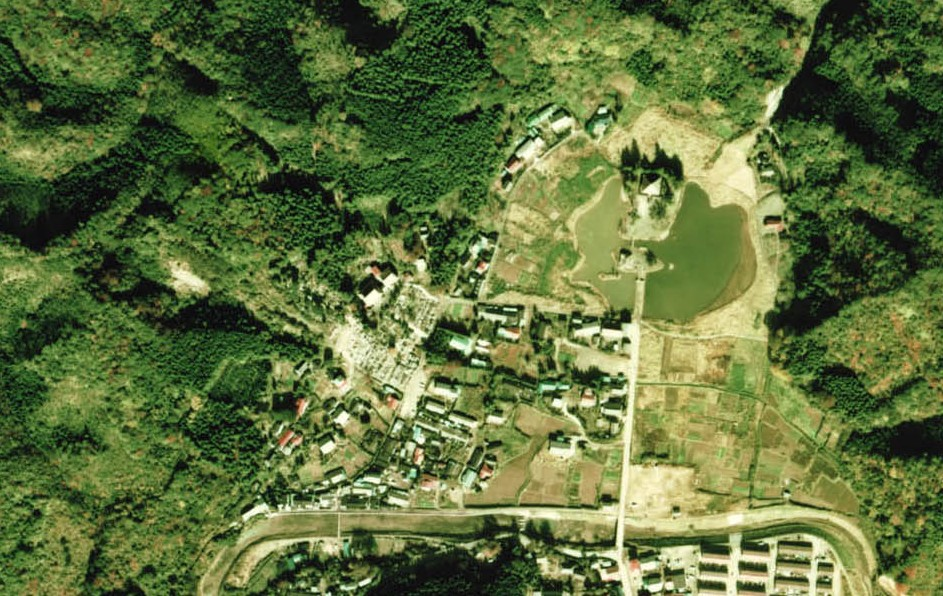
Aerial photograph

== See also ==
- Pure Land Buddhism
- List of National Treasures of Japan (temples)
- List of Historic Sites of Japan (Fukushima)
- Mōtsū-ji
