= Kamegamori-Chinjumori Kofun =

Ancient grave site in Fukushima, Tōhoku, Japan

- 亀ヶ森・鎮守森古墳 (Japanese)
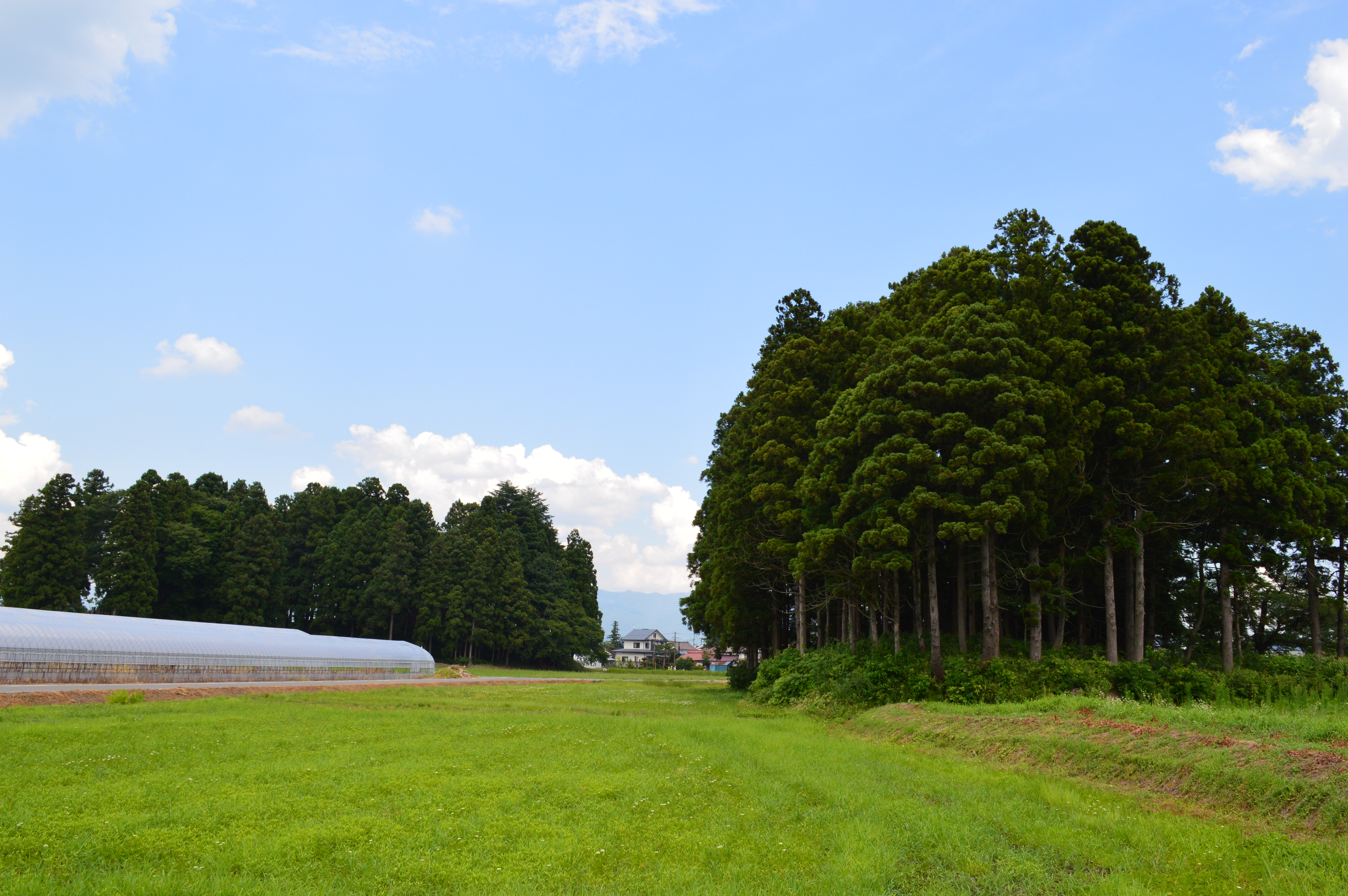
- Kamegamori-kofun to the right and Chinjumori-kofun to the left

- Kamegamori-Chinjumori Kofun Kamegamori-Chinjumori Kofun (Japan)
- 37°35′31″N 139°49′40″E
- Type: Kofun
- Periods: Kofun period
- Location: Aizubange, Fukushima, Japan
- Region: Tōhoku region

History
- Built: late 4th century AD

Site notes
- Public access: Yes (no facilities)

The Kamegamori-Chinjumori Kofun (亀ヶ森・鎮守森古墳, Kamegamori-Chinjumori Kofun) are a pair of early Kofun period (late 4th century AD) megalithic tumuli located in what is now part of the town of Aizubange, Fukushima in the southern Tōhoku region of Japan. The site was designated a National Historic Site of Japan in 1976.

== Overview ==
The Kamegamori kofun is located in the northern part of Aizu on the west side of Aozu hamlet south of the Aga River, in a rural area surrounded by rice fields. The tumulus is a zenpō-kōen-fun (前方後円墳), which is shaped like a keyhole, having one square end and one circular end, when viewed from above. It has a total length of 129.4 meters, with a rectangular portion length of 55.0 meters, and a rear circle diameter of 74.4 meters. It was built in three tiers with a horseshoe-shaped moat and dates from the latter portion of the Kofun period (the second half of the 4th century). It is the second largest keyhole-shaped kofun in the Tōhoku region after the Raijinyama Kofun in Miyagi Prefecture. The tumulus has not been fully excavated, but in a trial survey in 1992, fragments of cylindrical haniwa and fukiishi were uncovered. The mounds are covered in a dense growth of cryptomeria and on top of the circular portion of the tumulus is a Shinto shrine and a Buddhist chapel.

The Chinjumori kofun in orientated in the same southerly direction, approximately 100 meets to the south of the Kamegamori kofun. The tumulus is a zenpō-kōhō-fun (前方後方墳) with the form of "two conjoined rectangles", and has a length of 55.2 meters, with a 26.2-meter rectangular portion, five meters height, and an 18-meter rear portion, about 2.5 meters high. A portion of a surrounding moat has been found. It was partly excavated from 1990 to 1991, and is believed to date from slightly earlier than the Kamegamori kofun. It also has a small Shinto shrine on its summit.

The site is approximately 20 minutes by car from Aizu-Bange Station on the JR East Tadami Line. At present, there are no public facilities at the site.

== See also ==
- List of Historic Sites of Japan (Fukushima)
