= Fukushima Museum =

- 福島県立博物館
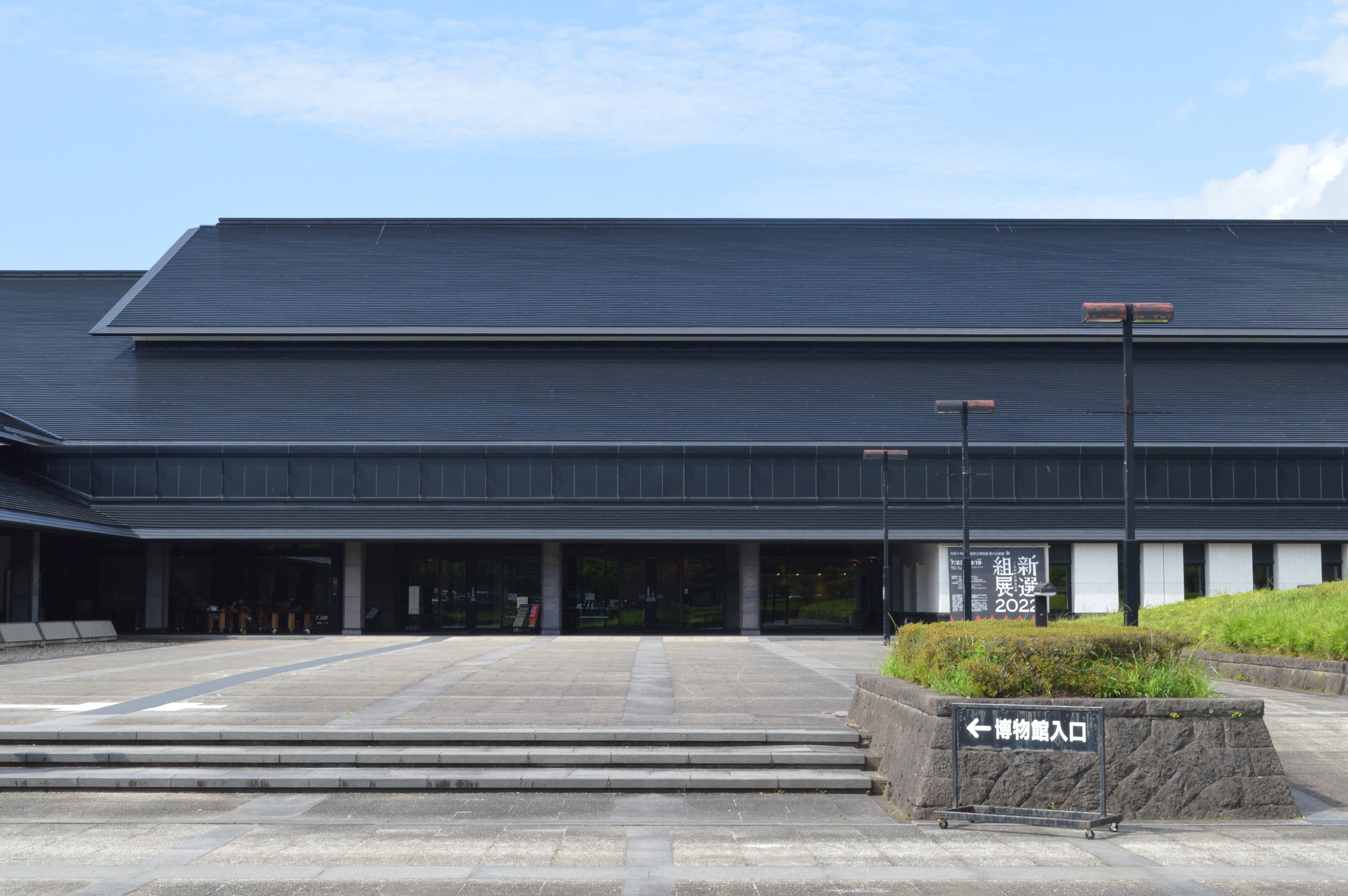

General information
- Location: 1-25 Jōtō-machi, Aizuwakamatsu, Fukushima Prefecture, Japan
- Coordinates: 37°29′19″N 139°56′6″E
- Opened: 18 October 1986

Technical details
- Floor area: 2,815 m^{2}

Website
- homepage (jp)

Fukushima Museum (福島県立博物館, Fukushima Kenritsu Hakubutsukan) is a prefectural museum in Aizuwakamatsu, Japan, dedicated to the natural history, history, and culture of Fukushima Prefecture. The museum opened in Tsuruga Castle Park in 1986.

== See also ==
- Fukushima Prefectural Museum of Art
- Mutsu Province
- List of Historic Sites of Japan (Fukushima)
- Aizuwakamatsu Castle
