= Futaba =

Futaba may refer to:

== People ==
- Akiko Futaba (二葉 あき子; 1915–2011), Japanese popular music singer
- Futaba Aoi (葵 二葉), Japanese manga artist
- Futaba Ito (伊藤 ふたば; born 2002), Japanese professional rock climber
- Futaba Kioka (木岡 二葉; born 1965), former Japanese football player.
- Yamakawa Futaba (山川 二葉; 1844–1909), Japanese educator

=== Fictional characters ===
- Futaba Aasu, anime character
- Hotaru Futaba, a video game character
- Samurai Futaba, a character played by John Belushi in Saturday Night Live Samurai
- Futaba Yoshioka, the protagonist from the anime and manga series Ao Haru Ride
- Futaba Sakura, a character from the video game Persona 5
- Futaba Sana, a character from the game Magia Record
- Rio Futaba, a character in the anime Rascal Does Not Dream of Bunny Girl Senpai
- Futaba Hanaya, a character from the Chinese/Japanese anime series To Be Herorine
- Tsukushi Futaba, a character from the anime franchise BanG Dream!
- Futaba Isurugi, a character in the Revue Starlight franchise
- Futaba Miyamizu (宮水 二葉), mother of Mitsuha and Yotsuha in Your Name
- Riho Futaba, a character and idol mascot for the Simple game series
- Futaba Aoi, a character from the manga/anime series You’re Under Arrest.
- Futaba Igarashi, a character in the anime My Senpai Annoying

== Places ==
- Futaba Dam, an asphalt dam located in Hokkaido Prefecture in Japan
- Futaba District, Fukushima, a district located in Fukushima Prefecture, Japan
- Futaba, Fukushima, a town in Futaba District, Fukushima, Japan
- Futaba Station, is a railway station in Fukushima, Japan.
- Futaba, Yamanashi, a town in Kitakoma District, Yamanashi, Japan

== Other ==
- Futaba Channel, a Japanese imageboard (commonly known as 2chan)
- Futaba Corporation, a manufacturer of radio control devices
- Futaba Group, a Late Cretaceous geologic group in Japan.

== See also ==
- Futaba-kun Change!, a manga series by Hiroshi Aro
