= 2019 IFSC Combined Qualifier =

- Location: Toulouse, France
- Dates: 28 November – 1 December 2019
- Competitors: 44 from 19 nations

Champions
- Men: (Japan) Kokoro Fujii
- Women: (Japan) Futaba Ito

The 2019 IFSC Combined Qualifier was an Olympic Qualifying Event. It was held from 28 November to 1 December 2019 in Toulouse, France. It was organized by the French Federation of Sport Climbing and Mountaineering or FFME (Federation Francaise Montagne Escalade). The athletes competed in combined format of three disciplines: speed, bouldering, and lead, simulating the 2020 Olympics format. Six athletes per gender would qualify for the 2020 Tokyo Olympics through this event. The winner for men was Kokoro Fujii and for women was Futaba Ito.

== Qualification for the 2020 Summer Olympics ==
The six best climbers of the combined event automatically qualify for the 2020 Summer Olympics, where sport climbing will make its debut. There are six spots available per gender, with a maximum of two spots per country. Japan had already filled their maximum quota of two athletes per gender, so no more athletes were going to qualify for the Olympics through this event.

The qualifiers for the 2020 Summer Olympics from the 2019 IFSC Combined Qualifier event were:

2020 Summer Olympic Qualifiers
Men	Women
Adam Ondra (CZE); Bassa Mawem (FRA); Jan Hojer (GER); Yufei Pan (CHN); Alberto Ginés López (ESP); Nathaniel Coleman (USA)	Julia Chanourdie (FRA); Mia Krampl (SLO); Iuliia Kaplina (RUS); Kyra Condie (USA); Laura Rogora (ITA); Yiling Song (CHN)

== Competition format ==
In the qualification round each of the twenty competitors competed in speed climbing, bouldering and lead climbing. The scores were multiplied and the 8 competitors with the lowest total scores proceeded to the final round.

In speed climbing, climbers raced against each other's in pairs on a standardized wall of 15m in height. In the qualification round, climbers had two runs on two different lanes; their best times were recorded and used for seeding placement in the final round. In the final round, climbers raced head-to-head with the fastest winning.

In bouldering, climbers needed to top boulder problems set on 4.5m-high wall within a certain amount of time. In the qualification round, climbers were faced with 4 boulder problems and given 5 minutes on each problem to top them. The final round had 3 boulder problems to top within a 4 minutes time limit.

In lead climbing, climbers were given a route set on 15m-high wall to top within 6 minutes. If there was a tie, the climber with the fastest elapsed time won.

=== Route-setting ===
Speed climbing wall is standardized: 15 meters tall, 5 degrees overhanging. Bouldering and lead climbing have route-setting teams.

The IFSC route-setters were Manuel Hassler (chief) from Switzerland and Adam Pustelnik (chief) from Poland, Romain Cabessut from France, Matthias Woitzuck from Austria, Martin Hammerer from Austria, and Remi Samyn from France.

The IFSC Technical Delegate was Fabrizio Minnino from Italy. The IFSC Jury President was Johannes Altner from Germany. The IFSC Judge was Paul Ledet from Canada.

== Schedule ==
Date	Nov 28			Nov 29			Nov 30			Dec 1		
Men	S Qualification: Speed climbing	B Qualification: Bouldering	L Qualification: Lead climbing				S Finals: Speed climbing	B Finals: Bouldering	L Finals: Lead climbing			
Women				S Qualification: Speed climbing	B Qualification: Bouldering	L Qualification: Lead climbing				S Finals: Speed climbing	B Finals: Bouldering	L Finals: Lead climbing
Legend:	S = Speed, B = Bouldering, L =Lead											

Q	Qualification	F	Finals

== Participating nations ==
44 climbers from 19 nations participated in the event. Athletes were invited based on the 2019 IFSC World Cup Combined Ranking and 2019 IFSC Climbing World Championships Combined Ranking. Athletes who were already qualified for the Olympics would not be invited.

- Austria (1)
- Canada (1)
- China (3)
- Czech Republic (1)
- France (5) Host
- Germany (2)
- Great Britain (1)
- Indonesia (2)
- Iran (1)
- Italy (2)
- Japan (6)
- Poland (1)
- Russia (3)
- Slovenia (4)
- South Korea (3)
- Spain (1)
- Switzerland (1)
- Ukraine (1)
- United States (5)

== Men ==
Rank	Name	Nation	Qualifications				Finals			
Rank	Name	Nation	S	B	L	CP	S	B	L	CP
1st place, gold medalist(s)	Kokoro Fujii	Japan	8	4	14	448	5	2	2	20
2nd place, silver medalist(s)	Adam Ondra	Czech Republic	14	2	1	28	8	3	1	24
3rd place, bronze medalist(s)	Meichi Narasaki	Japan	9	3	18	486	4	1	7	28
4	Bassa Mawem	France	1	21	20	420	1	8	8	64
5	Jan Hojer	Germany	3	13	8	312	2	7	5	70
6	Yufei Pan	China	7	1	7	49	3	4	6	72
7	Alberto Ginés López	Spain	11	11	2.5	302.5	7	5	3	105
8	Nathaniel Coleman	United States	6	5	15	450	6	6	4	144
9	Sean Bailey	United States	19	6	5	570	—			
10	Keita Dohi	Japan	4	12	13	624	—			
11	Nikolai Iarilovets	Russia	5	14	12	840	—			
12	Stefano Ghisolfi	Italy	21	16	2.5	840	—			
13	Alfian Muhammad Fajri	Indonesia	2	22	21	924	—			
14	William Bosi	Great Britain	12	9	9	972	—			
15	Sascha Lehmann	Switzerland	18	19	4	1368	—			
16	Rei Sugimoto	Japan	13	10	11	1430	—			
17	Jongwon Chon	South Korea	10	8	19	1520	—			
18	Yannick Flohe	Germany	15	20	6	1800	—			
19	Jernej Kruder	Slovenia	17	7	16	1904	—			
20	Aleksey Rubtsov	Russia	22	15	10	3300	—			
21	Anze Peharc	Slovenia	20	17	17	5780	—			
22	Manuel Cornu	France	16	18	22	6336	—			

== Women ==
Rank	Name	Nation	Qualifications				Finals			
Rank	Name	Nation	S	B	L	CP	S	B	L	CP
1st place, gold medalist(s)	Futaba Ito	Japan	7	7	8	392	4	1	7	28
2nd place, silver medalist(s)	Julia Chanourdie	France	10	6	7	420	3	5	2	30
3rd place, bronze medalist(s)	Mia Krampl	Slovenia	20	3	2	120	7	7	1	49
4	Lucka Rakovec	Slovenia	15	1	3	45	6	3	3	54
5	Ai Mori	Japan	22	2	1	44	8	2	4	64
6	Iuliia Kaplina	Russia	1	21	21	441	1	8	8	64
7	Kyra Condie	United States	6	8	11	528	2	6	6	72
8	Laura Rogora	Italy	16	4	4	256	5	4	5	100
9	Yiling Song	China	2	20	19	760	—			
10	Fanny Gibert	France	13	5	12	780	—			
11	Margo Hayes	United States	19	10	5	950	—			
12	Sandra Lettner	Austria	8	14	9	1008	—			
13	Alannah Yip	Canada	12	9	10	1080	—			
14	Jain Kim	South Korea	14	15	6	1260	—			
15	Anouck Jaubert	France	4	18	20	1440	—			
16	Aries Susanti Rahayu	Indonesia	3	22	22	1452	—			
17	Aleksandra Kałucka	Poland	5	19	18	1710	—			
18	Sol Sa	South Korea	9	16	13	1872	—			
19	Yuetong Zhang	China	11	17	14	2618	—			
20	Ievgeniia Kazbekova	Ukraine	17	11	15	2805	—			
21	Elnaz Rekabi	Iran	18	13	17	3978	—			
22	Ashima Shiraishi	United States	21	12	16	4032	—			
