= Kiyotosaku Cave Tombs =

Archaeological site in Futaba, Japan

- 清戸迫横穴 (Japanese)
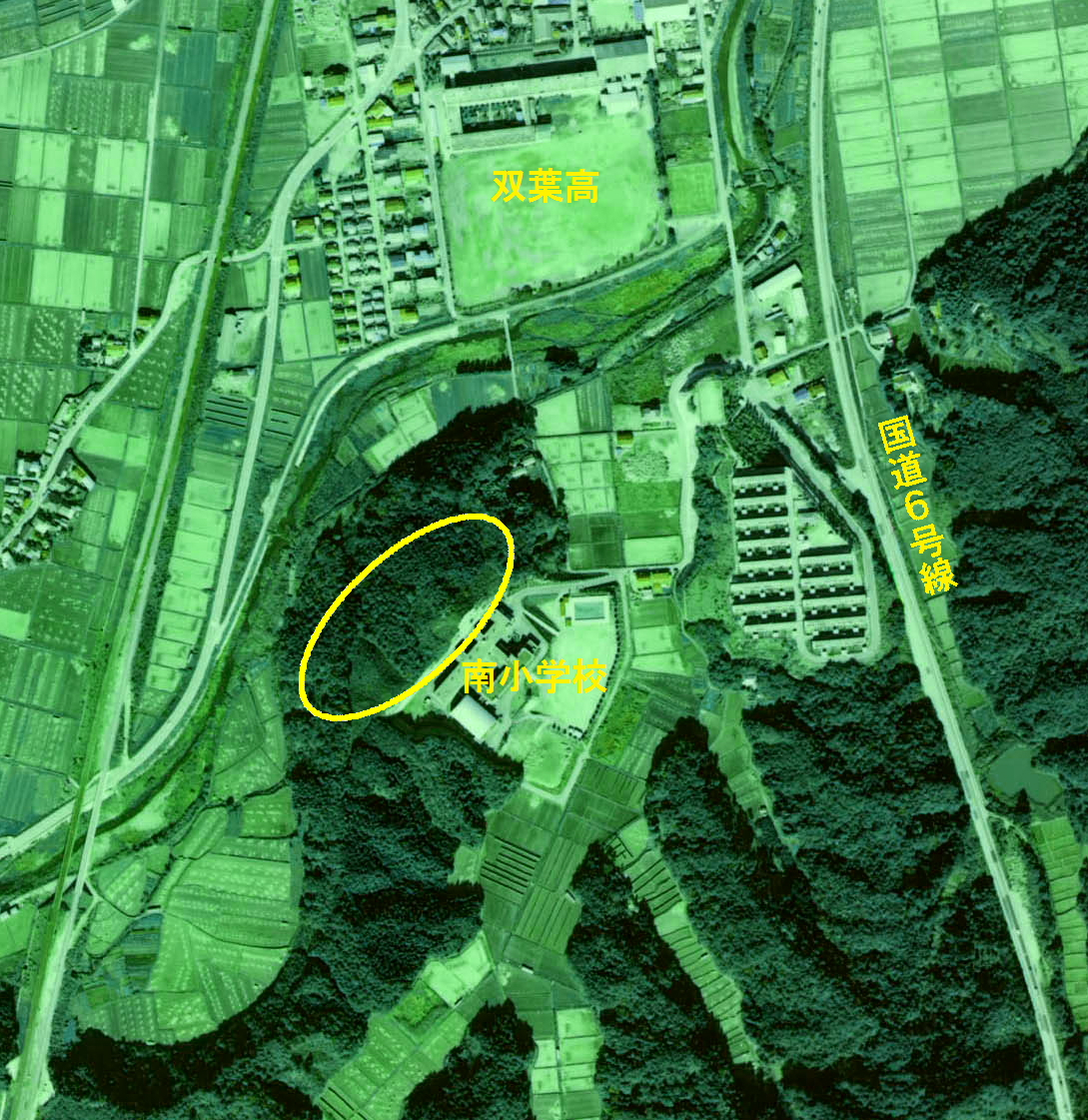
- Aerial photo of location in 1975

- Kiyotosaku Cave Tombs Kiyotosaku Cave Tombs (Japan)
- 37°26′31″N 141°00′17″E
- Type: Yokoanabo
- Location: Futaba, Fukushima, Japan
- Region: Tōhoku region

History
- Built: Kofun period

Site notes
- Excavation dates: 1988
- Public access: Yes

Kiyotosaku Cave Tombs (清戸迫横穴, Kiyotosaku Yokoana) is an archaeological site containing numerous Kofun period yokoanabo located in what is now part of the town of Futaba, Fukushima in the southern Tōhoku region of Japan. It is significant in that its tomb No.76 is a highly decorated kofun with geometric patterns, human figures and animals painted in red on the walls of the burial chamber. The site was designated a National Historic Site of Japan in 1968.

== Overview ==
The site dates from the first half of the 7th century and consists of over 300 graves located on hilly land. The existence of these tombs has been known since ancient times, but they were only excavated in 1968, as part of rescue archaeology during construction work on the Futaba Minami Elementary School. Most were destroyed by the construction; however, tomb No.76 was found to contain well preserved mural paintings. The tomb has a rectangular opening facing southeast and is 3.15 meters in length, 1.56 meters in height and 2.34 to 2.8 meters in width. The murals include spiral designed in red iron oxide, with a crowned human figure wearing a hakama and shoes, and another figure with a helmet and a raised left hand next to a horse. Other designs include figures with bows and arrows representing a hunting scene, with wild boar, deer and dogs.

The site was damaged by the 2011 Tōhoku earthquake and tsunami and since the Fukushima Daiichi nuclear disaster has been in an area off limits to the public due to radiation. In February 2017, Tohoku University received special permission to revisit the site, and to make a detailed three-dimensional scan of the interior of the tomb, in order to have a detailed record of the dimensions of the tomb and its interior decorations just in case future damage should occur.

The site is about 20 minutes on foot from Futaba Station on the JR East Jōban Line.

== See also ==
- List of Historic Sites of Japan (Fukushima)
