= Yonomori =

Forest area in the central Hamadōri area of Fukushima Prefecture, Japan

Coordinates: 37°22′46″N 140°59′30″E

Yonomori (夜ノ森) is a forest area located in the central Hamadōri area of Fukushima Prefecture, on the border between the towns of Tomioka and Ōkuma.

== Geographical features ==
Yonomori Station and Joban Tomioka Interchange are located in the west, and National Route 6 runs north to south in the east.

=== Border area ===
Yonomori is the northern limit of the Joban coalfields, and in terms of natural geography, the area south of Yonomori was a coalfield and mineral spring area, while the area north of Yonomori was not. Before the Futaba District was established on April 1, 1896, Yonomori was the border between Naraha District to the south and Shimeha District to the north. During the Sengoku period, it was the border between the Iwaki clan's territory (south) and the Sōma clan's territory (north), and during the Edo period, it was the border between Iwakidaira Domain (south) and Sōma Nakamura Domain (north).

Although the area is generally called "Hamadori," the dialects, exchange areas, and historical colors are different on either side of Yonomori. The area north of Yonomori (former Soma clan territory) has strong ties with southern Miyagi Prefecture, such as Watari and Sendai, while the area south of Yonomori (former Iwaki clan territory) has strong ties with northern Ibaraki Prefecture, such as Hitachi and Mito. The dialects north of Yonomori (Soma dialect) are closer to Sendai dialect, while the area south of Yonomori (Iwaki dialect) is closer to Mito dialect.

During the high economic growth period of the 1960s, two nuclear power plants of Tokyo Electric Power Company were built near Yonomori, the Fukushima Daiichi Nuclear Power Plant in Okuma on the Soma side, and the Fukushima Daini Nuclear Power Plant in Tomioka on the Iwaki side. Yonomori is located 6 km southwest of the Fukushima Daiichi Nuclear Power Plant. Due to the Fukushima nuclear accident on March 11, 2011, the area was designated a "difficult-to-return zone" (a "restricted zone" at the time of the accident) and off-limits, but as of January 26, 2022, it was designated a "specific reconstruction and revitalization base zone" and entry is now permitted.

A large-scale solar power plant called the Tomioka Revitalization Mega Solar Power Plant SAKURA, with a capacity of approximately 30,000 kilowatts, led by local residents, was built on 350,000 square meters of farmland west of Yonomori Station, at a total cost of approximately 9.5 billion yen, and began operations on November 20, 2017.

=== Flower Spot ===
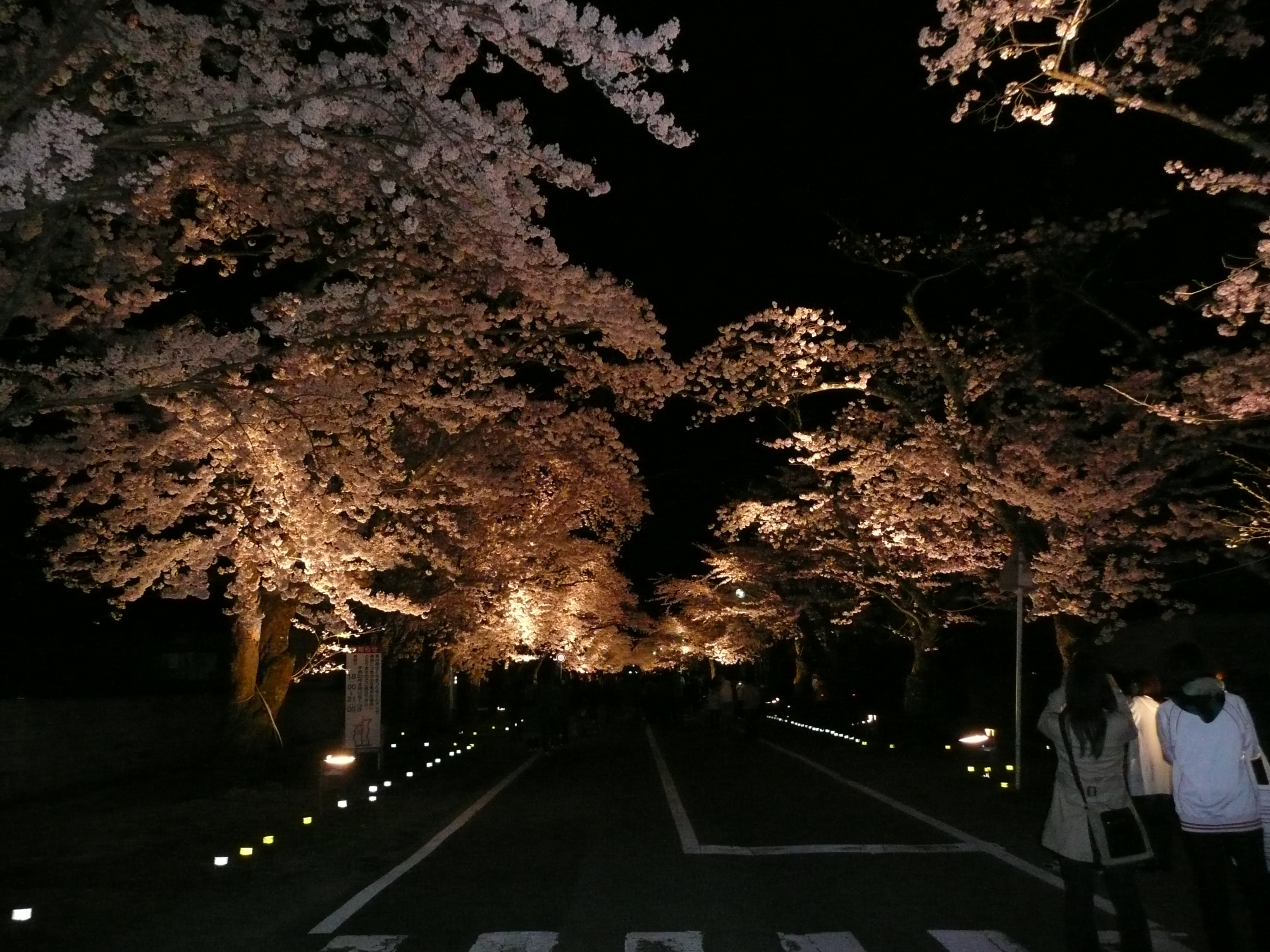
Cherry blossom trees at night（April 2008)

The cherry blossom trees of Yonomori began in 1900 after the Boshin War, when Kiyotoshi Hantani, the son of a former Nakamura feudal lord, planted them to mark the start of rural development. About 1,500 cherry trees, including some 100-year-old Yoshino cherry trees, form an L-shaped tunnel of cherry blossoms about 2.5 meters long, and the area is known as a famous cherry blossom spot representing Hamadori.
