= Tomioka, Fukushima =

Tomioka 富岡町
- Town
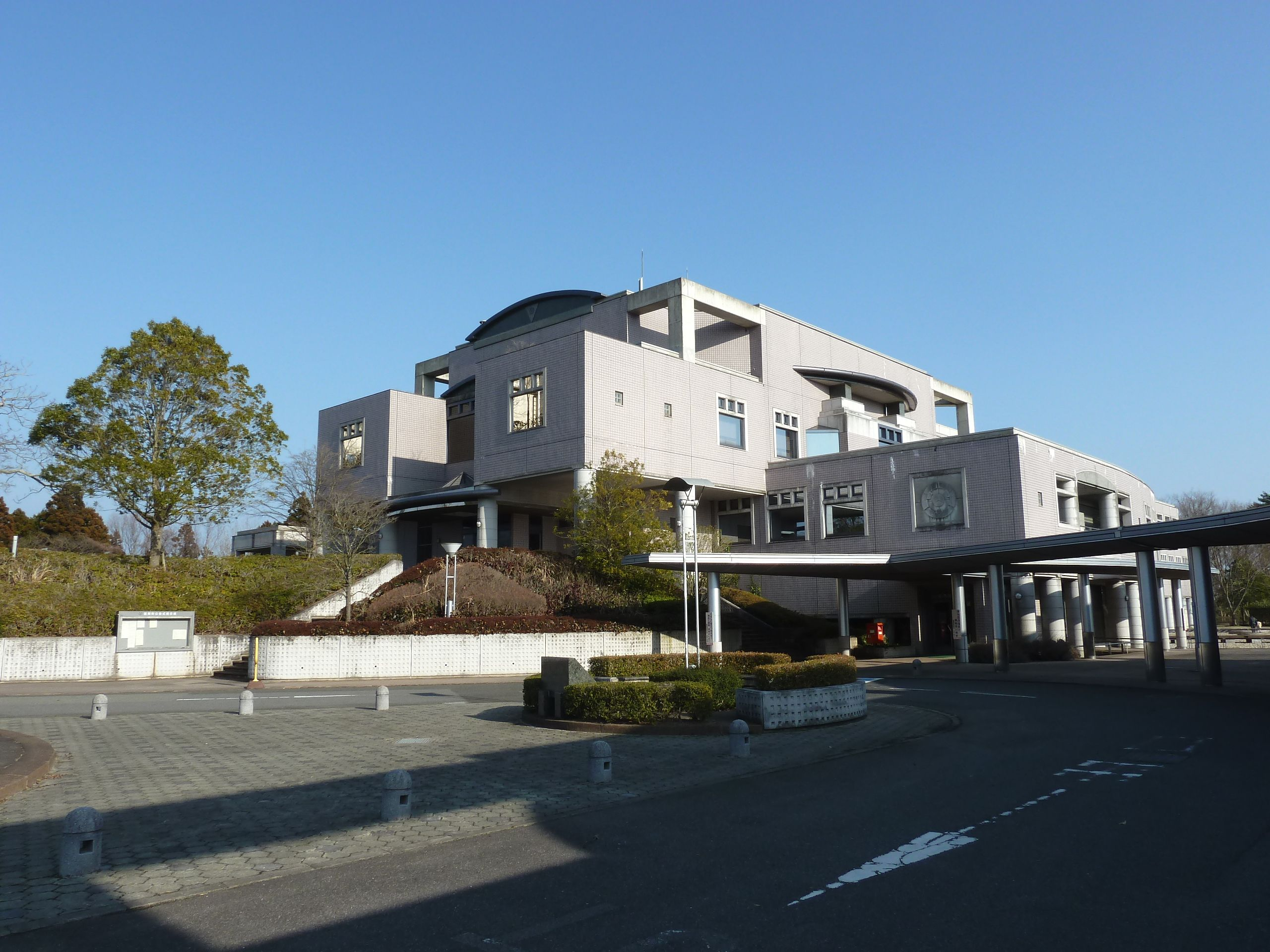
- Tomioka Town Hall

- Flag Emblem

- Location of Tomioka in Fukushima Prefecture

- Coordinates: 37°19′59″N 141°01′01″E
- Country: Japan
- Region: Tōhoku
- Prefecture: Fukushima
- District: Futaba

Government
  - Mayor: Ikuo Yamamoto

Area
  - Total: 68.39 km^{2} (26.41 sq mi)

Population (June 1, 2023)
  - Total: 1,326
  - Density: 19.39/km^{2} (50.22/sq mi)
- Time zone: UTC+9 (Japan Standard Time)
- Tree: Sakura
- Flower: Azalea
- Bird: Motacillidae
- Phone number: 0120-33-6466
- Address: Motooka Otsuka 622-1, Tomioka-machi, Futaba-gun, Fukushima-ken 979-1192
- Website: Official website

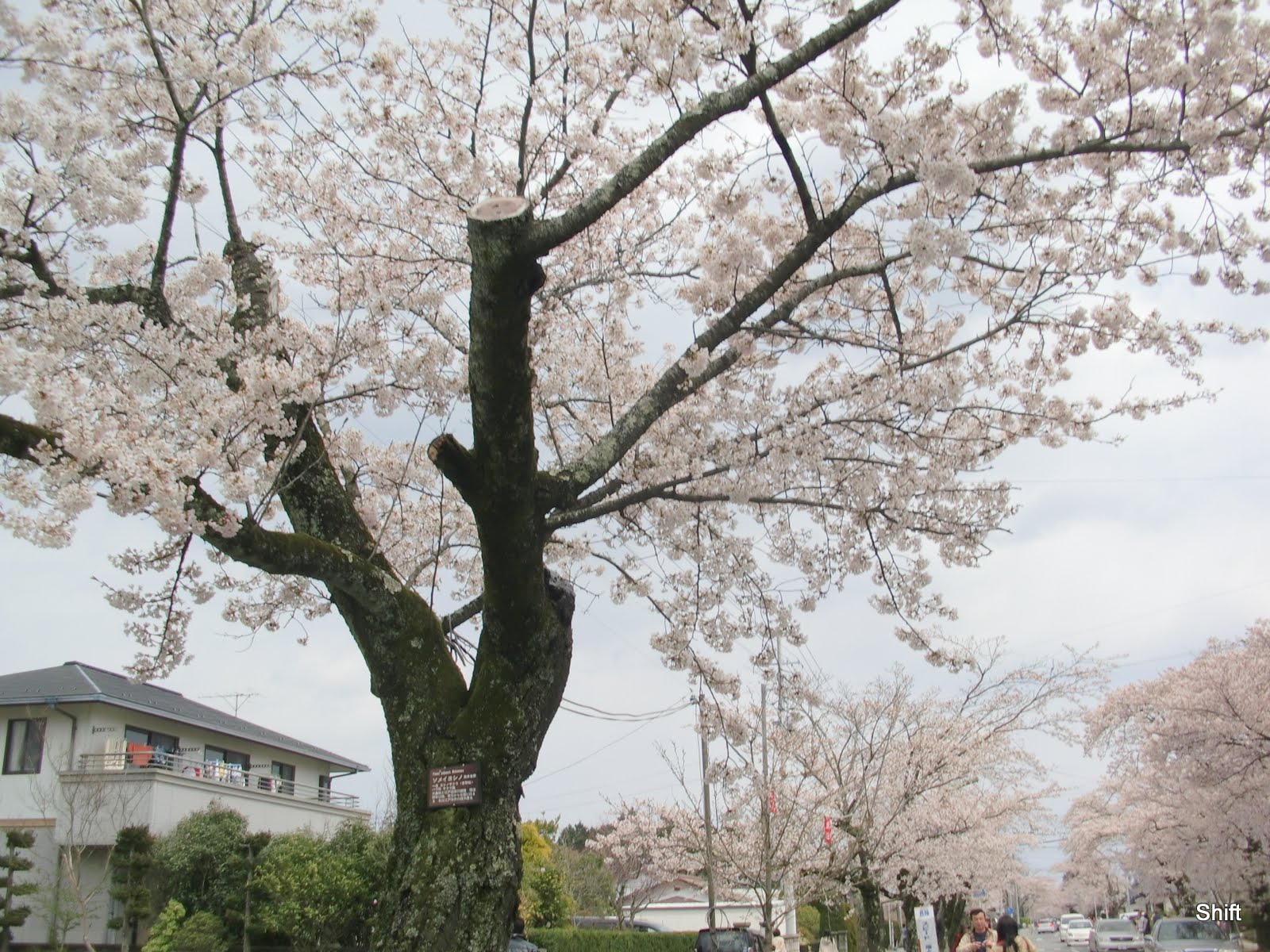
Sakura near Yonomori Station

Tomioka (富岡町, Tomioka-machi) is a town located in Fukushima Prefecture, Japan. As of 1 June 2023, the town had an estimated population of 1,326 in 5578 households and a population density of 19.4 persons per km^{2}, although the current actual resident population is considerably smaller than in 2010. The total area is 68.39 square kilometres (26.41 sq mi).

== Geography ==
Tomioka is located on the Pacific Ocean coastline of central Fukushima. It is the location for the Fukushima Daiichi Nuclear Power Plant, owned by the Tokyo Electric Power Company.

The town of Tomioka is divided into two main districts, each with their own train station. To the south is Tomioka, which is the main area. To the north, on top of the hill, is Yonomori, a smaller and much newer neighborhood. Though the two areas operate under one government, physical distance makes them feel like two separate towns.

=== Surrounding municipalities ===
- Fukushima Prefecture
  - Kawauchi
  - Naraha
  - Ōkuma

== Demographics ==
Per Japanese census data, the population of Tomoka remained relatively steady until the nuclear disaster.

Historical population
Year	Pop.	±%
1920	8,290	—
1930	8,141	−1.8%
1940	8,629	+6.0%
1950	12,913	+49.6%
1960	12,597	−2.4%
1970	11,614	−7.8%
1980	14,941	+28.6%
1990	15,861	+6.2%
2000	16,173	+2.0%
2010	15,996	−1.1%
2020	2,128	−86.7%

== Climate ==
Tomioka has a humid continental climate (Köppen Cfa) characterized by mild summers and cold winters with heavy snowfall. The average annual temperature in Tomioka is 12.5 °C. The average annual rainfall is 1329 mm with September as the wettest month. The temperatures are highest on average in August, at around 24.4 °C, and lowest in January, at around 2.0 °C.

== History ==
The area of present-day Tomioka was part of Mutsu Province. The remains of Kofun period burial mounds have been found in the area. During the Edo period, it was originally part of Iwakitaira Domain, but from 1747 was divided between Tanagura Domain, Tako Domain and tenryō territory directly under the Tokugawa shogunate. After the Meiji restoration, on April 1, 1889, the village of Tomioka was created within Naraha District, Fukushima with the establishment of the modern municipalities system. Naraha District became Futaba District in April 1896. Tomioka was raised to town status on March 1, 1900. It merged with the neighboring town of Futaba on March 31, 1955.

=== 2011 Tōhoku earthquake and tsunami ===
Tomioka was severely affected by the Fukushima Daiichi nuclear disaster, and the 2011 Tōhoku earthquake and tsunami on March 11, 2011. Besides sustaining considerable damage from the earthquake, and the tsunami (which devastated the coastal area), the town was evacuated en masse on the morning of March 12 as it is located well within the 20 kilometer exclusion radius around the damaged Fukushima Daiichi nuclear power plant. Only one man, 66–67-year-old fifth-generation rice farmer Naoto Matsumura, with his dog, refused to evacuate, and remained behind to feed the pets and livestock left behind in his neighborhood with supplies donated by support groups.

On March 25, 2013, the nuclear evacuation zone in Tomioka was lifted by the central government, and the town was re-zoned into three areas according to different levels of radiation. However, the town government elected to keep the evacuation in place for at least another four years due to the need to rebuild damaged infrastructure. One of the damaged structures was a top floor of a home which had been thrown onto the street from the tsunami. Shortly after the residents returned, the house was spray painted red with the Hito (人) symbol, hito meaning people. This building came to be known as the Hito House. It is not clear who graffitied it, or why. In the zone with the highest radiation levels residents will not be allowed to return home at least for five years. People other than registered residents are banned from entry. This zone, which covers the northeastern part of the town, had about 4,500 people residents. The central part of the town, which used to have 10,000 residents was designated as a residence restriction zone, in which the residents could return during daytime hours but have to leave at night. The remaining zone, which mainly covers southern Tomioka had about 1,500 residents, and remaining restrictions are expected to be lifted.

However, in a survey taken in 2013, some 40 percent of the town's residents responded that they had decided never to return, and 43 percent were undecided. Concerns over radiation exposure, and the loss of compensation money from TEPCO should they decide to return, coupled with uncertainty over whether or not they could make a living in Tomioka were major issues. On April 1, 2017, the evacuation order was lifted for most of the town except for the northeastern areas, allowing many residents to return.

As of 2023, decontamination of the remaining areas of Tomioka is continuing to take place; an area of four square kilometres was decontaminated fully on April 2, 2023, accompanied by a statement by the Japanese Prime Minister, Fumio Kishida, that pledged to fully decontaminate the town.

== Economy ==
The economy of Tomioka is heavily dependent on commercial fishing and agriculture.

== Education ==
=== High schools ===
Tomioka, Fukushima Prefectural HighSchool (founded in 1950) is the only high school in the town.

=== Junior high schools ===
There are two public junior high schools in Tomioka - Tomioka 1st Junior High School and Tomioka 2nd Junior High School.

=== Elementary schools ===
There are two public elementary schools in Tomioka - Tomioka 1st Elementary School and Tomioka 2nd Elementary School.

== Transportation ==
=== Railway ===
JR East – Jōban Line

- Tomioka – Yonomori

=== Highway ===
- Jōban Expressway – Tomioka Interchange
- National Route 6

== Local attractions ==
=== Fukushima Daini Nuclear Power Plant ===
The Fukushima Daini Nuclear Power Plant is a nuclear power plant located on a 1,500,000-square-metre (370-acre) site straddling Tomioka and Naraha, run by the Tokyo Electric Power Company (TEPCO). After the 2011 Tōhoku earthquake and tsunami, the four reactors automatically shut down and the plant remains offline.

=== Hayama shrine ===
The main Shinto shrine in Tomioka is Hayama shrine where a fire festival was held to pray for a good harvest. The shrine is known as "Number 33, the thirty-third shrine in a pilgrimage path which goes across the country.

=== Tomioka government office complex ===
This complex consisted of three buildings connected by walkways and a mini park. The center building was home to the city government offices. On the left side of the complex is a building that used to house a large auditorium and the city's public library. The right side of the complex featured a small health center. The whole complex is located just north of where the Joban train line crosses Route 6 and is across the highway from the Tomioka Sports Center.

=== Yonomori Park ===
This park was very popular in spring when the cherry blossoms are blooming. Many locals came to view the blossoms and enjoy the festival atmosphere. During the Cherry Blossom Festival, there were many food, trinket, and game stalls. The town is famous for having one of the longest cherry blossom tunnels in Japan.

=== Tomioka Sports Center ===
Located between Route 6 and the ocean, this sports center contained multiple tennis courts and a baseball field, among other attractions. The facilities could be rented by the hour for a very reasonable price. Some local sports clubs met here.

=== Refre ===
Located at the intersection of the two roads with cherry blossom tunnels, Refre (リフレ) was a popular meeting place. Its facilities include a conference room with seating and catering for hundreds of people, a hotel, a fitness center, a hot spring, one indoor heated pool for lap swimming, and one indoor/outdoor pool for general use, though the second pool is closed during the winter months.

=== Tomioka Beach ===
During the summer months leading up to Obon, a beach is open for public swimming. After Obon, however, the beach is typically closed due to a large jellyfish population that migrates to the area in the summer. The beach is a short distance from Tomioka station.

== International relations ==
- Auckland, New Zealand, friendship city since December 6, 1983
- (China) Haiyan County, Zhejiang, friendship city since June 20, 1995
