= Ōno Station (Fukushima) =

Railway station in Ōkuma, Fukushima Prefecture, Japan

Ōno Station 大野駅
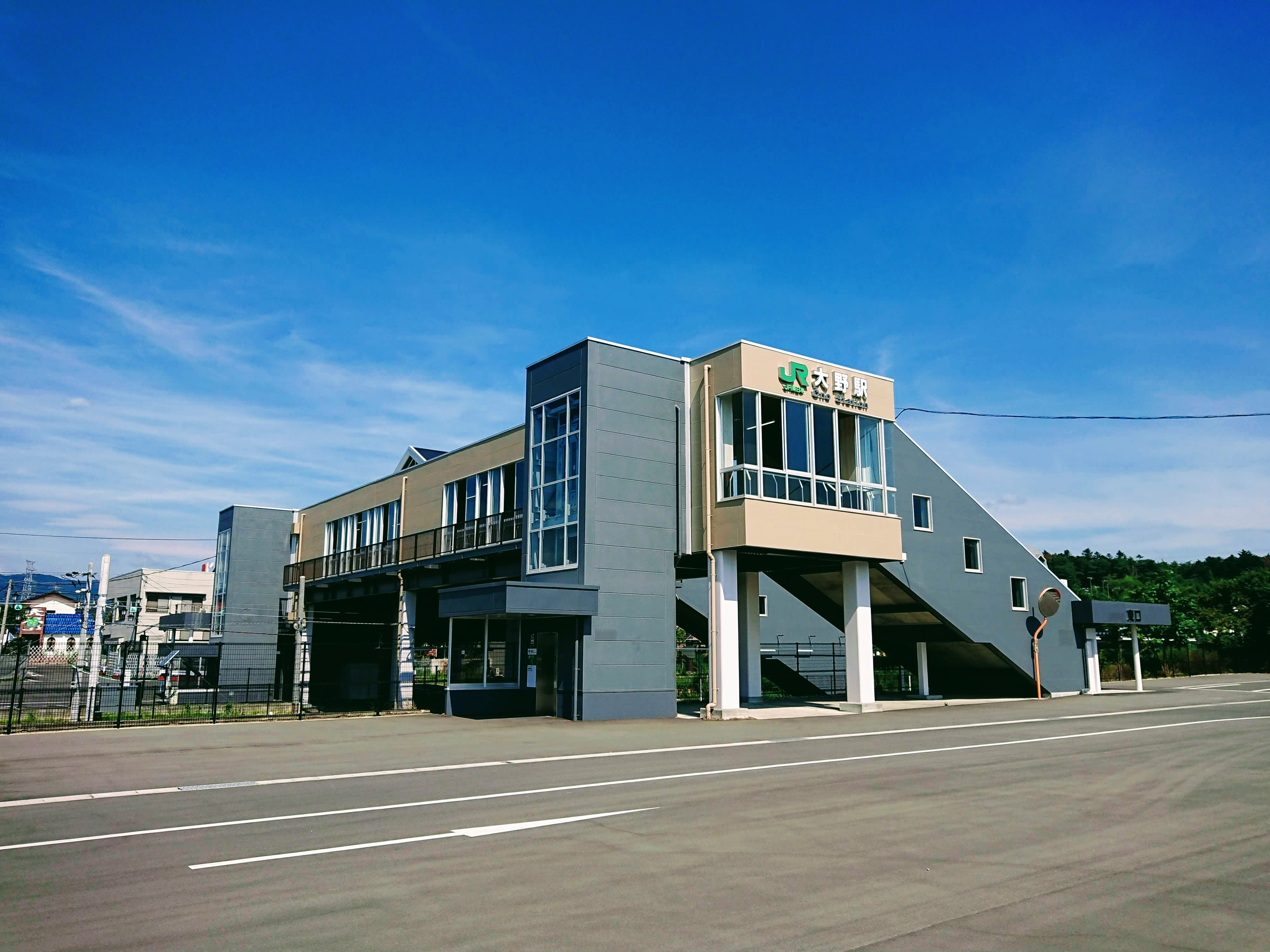
- Ōno Station in August 2020

General information
- Location: Shimonogami Ono 248, Ōkuma-machi, Futaba-gun, Fukushima-ken 979-1308; Japan
- Coordinates: 37.4094°N 140.9844°E
- Operator: JR East
- Line: ■ Joban Line
- Distance: 257.9 km from Nippori
- Platforms: 2 island platform
- Tracks: 2

Other information
- Status: Unstaffed
- Website: Official website

History
- Opened: 1904; 122 years ago 14 March 2020; 6 years ago

Passengers
- FY2010: 616 daily

Services
Preceding station	JR East	Following station
Tomioka towards Shinagawa	Hitachi	Futaba towards Sendai
Yonomori towards Shinagawa	Jōban Line Local-Futsuu	Futaba towards Sendai
Location
- Location within Fukushima Prefecture Location within Japan

Ōno Station (大野駅, Ōno-eki) is a railway station in the town of Ōkuma, Fukushima, Japan, operated by the East Japan Railway Company (JR East).

== Lines ==
Ōno Station is served by the Jōban Line, and is located 257.9 km (160.3 mi) from the official starting point of the line at Nippori Station. However, due to the Fukushima Daiichi nuclear disaster, services were suspended until March 14, 2020.

== Station layout ==
The station has an elevated station building with one island platform underneath. The station had a Midori no Madoguchi staffed ticket office. But it is now an unstaffed station (from 14 March 2020).

=== Platforms ===
1	■ Jōban Line	for Haranomachi and Sendai
2	■ Jōban Line	for Iwaki and Mito

== History ==
Ōno Station was opened on 22 November 1904. The station was absorbed into the JR East network upon the privatization of the Japanese National Railways (JNR) on 1 April 1987. The station was closed on 11 March 2011 following the Fukushima Daiichi nuclear disaster. The section of the line between Tomioka and Namie was reopened on the 14 March 2020 allowing for the resumption of passenger services to Ōno Station.

== Passenger statistics ==
In fiscal 2010, the station was used by an average of 616 passengers daily (boarding passengers only). The passenger figures for previous years are as shown below.

Fiscal year	Daily average
2000	735
2005	702
2010	616
2015	0 (Services suspended)

== Surrounding area ==
Ōno Station is located three kilometers west of the Fukushima Daiichi Nuclear Power Plant and is the closest train station to the plant. Entering the area is currently prohibited due to high radiation levels.

- Ōkuma Town Hall
- Ōkuma Post Office
- National Route 6

== See also ==
- List of railway stations in Japan
