= Sport climbing at the 2018 Asian Games – Women's combined =

Women's combined at the 2018 Asian Games
- Venue: Jakabaring Sport City
- Date: 23–26 August 2018
- Competitors: 20 from 12 nations

Medalists
gold medal	Akiyo Noguchi	Japan
silver medal	Sa Sol	South Korea
bronze medal	Kim Ja-in	South Korea

The women's competition combined climbing event at the 2018 Asian Games took place from 23 August to 26 August 2018 at Jakabaring Sport City, Palembang, Indonesia.

== Schedule ==
All times are Western Indonesia Time (UTC+07:00)

Date	Time	Event
Thursday, 23 August 2018	11:30	Qualification – Speed
Friday, 24 August 2018	09:00	Qualification – Boulder
Saturday, 25 August 2018	09:15	Qualification – Lead
Sunday, 26 August 2018	08:00	Final – Speed
Sunday, 26 August 2018	09:30	Final – Boulder
Sunday, 26 August 2018	12:00	Final – Lead

== Results ==
Legend

- DNS — Did not start
- FS — False start
- T — Top hold
- z — Zone hold

=== Qualification ===
==== Speed ====
Rank	Athlete	Lane A	Lane B	Best
1	Assel Marlenova (KAZ)	8.911	10.316	8.911
2	Ndona Nasugian (INA)	9.024	9.643	9.024
3	Jiang Rong (CHN)	9.102	9.677	9.102
4	Widia Fujiyanti (INA)	9.259	14.273	9.259
5	Lee Hung-ying (TPE)	10.701	9.327	9.327
6	Sa Sol (KOR)	9.847	9.693	9.693
7	Margarita Agambayeva (KAZ)	9.720	9.955	9.720
8	Kim Ja-in (KOR)	10.495	10.948	10.495
9	Futaba Ito (JPN)	10.921	10.527	10.527
10	Renqing Lamu (CHN)	10.807	Fall	10.807
11	Akiyo Noguchi (JPN)	11.618	11.304	11.304
12	Elnaz Rekabi (IRI)	11.623	11.454	11.454
13	Tan Jie Yi (MAS)	Fall	11.497	11.497
14	Pankaew Plypoolsup (THA)	11.702	12.134	11.702
15	Puntarika Tunyavanich (THA)	12.560	11.942	11.942
16	Vanessa Teng (SGP)	12.470	14.079	12.470
17	Shreya Sanjay Nankar (IND)	15.201	14.464	14.464
18	Batbaataryn Ariunbayar (MGL)	26.370	Fall	26.370
19	Namkhain Anujin (MGL)	Fall	44.596	44.596
20	Siti Nursarah Salehhodin (MAS)	FS	DNS	FS

==== Boulder ====
Rank	Athlete	Boulder				Result
Rank	Athlete	1	2	3	4	Result
1	Sa Sol (KOR)	T	T	T	T	4T6 4z6
2	Kim Ja-in (KOR)	T	T	T	T	4T8 4z5
3	Elnaz Rekabi (IRI)	T	T	z	T	3T4 4z5
3	Akiyo Noguchi (JPN)	T	T	z	T	3T4 4z5
5	Vanessa Teng (SGP)	T	T	z	T	3T4 4z7
6	Lee Hung-ying (TPE)	T	T	z	T	3T5 4z5
7	Futaba Ito (JPN)	T	T	z	T	3T5 4z7
8	Puntarika Tunyavanich (THA)	T	T	z	T	3T7 4z7
9	Jiang Rong (CHN)	T		z	T	2T2 3z3
10	Renqing Lamu (CHN)	T		z	T	2T3 3z3
11	Assel Marlenova (KAZ)	T		z	T	2T5 3z6
12	Pankaew Plypoolsup (THA)	T			T	2T2 2z2
13	Margarita Agambayeva (KAZ)	T			T	2T5 2z2
14	Widia Fujiyanti (INA)	T			T	2T6 2z6
15	Ndona Nasugian (INA)	T			T	2T8 2z2
16	Tan Jie Yi (MAS)	T			z	1T3 2z3
17	Shreya Sanjay Nankar (IND)	T				1T4 1z3
18	Siti Nursarah Salehhodin (MAS)	z			z	0T0 2z4
19	Namkhain Anujin (MGL)					0T0 0z0
19	Batbaataryn Ariunbayar (MGL)					0T0 0z0

==== Lead ====
Rank	Athlete	Result	Time
1	Kim Ja-in (KOR)	Top	
2	Akiyo Noguchi (JPN)	48+	
3	Sa Sol (KOR)	39+	3:21
4	Futaba Ito (JPN)	39+	3:26
5	Renqing Lamu (CHN)	38+	
6	Elnaz Rekabi (IRI)	37+	
7	Widia Fujiyanti (INA)	36+	3:52
8	Lee Hung-ying (TPE)	36+	4:34
9	Vanessa Teng (SGP)	28+	2:16
10	Margarita Agambayeva (KAZ)	28+	2:21
11	Jiang Rong (CHN)	28+	2:42
12	Ndona Nasugian (INA)	28+	3:11
13	Puntarika Tunyavanich (THA)	28	
14	Pankaew Plypoolsup (THA)	23	
15	Tan Jie Yi (MAS)	19+	1:53
16	Assel Marlenova (KAZ)	19+	2:01
17	Siti Nursarah Salehhodin (MAS)	18+	
18	Shreya Sanjay Nankar (IND)	18	
19	Batbaataryn Ariunbayar (MGL)	13	
20	Namkhain Anujin (MGL)	2	

==== Summary ====
Rank	Athlete	Speed	Boulder	Lead	Total
1	Kim Ja-in (KOR)	8	2	1	16
2	Sa Sol (KOR)	6	1	3	18
3	Akiyo Noguchi (JPN)	11	3.5	2	77
4	Assel Marlenova (KAZ)	1	11	16	176
5	Lee Hung-ying (TPE)	5	6	8	240
6	Futaba Ito (JPN)	9	7	4	252
7	Elnaz Rekabi (IRI)	12	3.5	6	252
8	Jiang Rong (CHN)	3	9	11	297
9	Ndona Nasugian (INA)	2	15	12	360
10	Widia Fujiyanti (INA)	4	14	7	392
11	Renqing Lamu (CHN)	10	10	5	500
12	Vanessa Teng (SGP)	16	5	9	720
13	Margarita Agambayeva (KAZ)	7	13	10	910
14	Puntarika Tunyavanich (THA)	15	8	13	1560
15	Pankaew Plypoolsup (THA)	14	12	14	2352
16	Tan Jie Yi (MAS)	13	16	15	3120
17	Shreya Sanjay Nankar (IND)	17	17	18	5202
18	Siti Nursarah Salehhodin (MAS)	20	18	17	6120
19	Batbaataryn Ariunbayar (MGL)	18	19.5	19	6669
20	Namkhain Anujin (MGL)	19	19.5	20	7410

=== Final ===
==== Speed ====
Quarterfinals
1	Assel Marlenova (KAZ)	10.286
6	Akiyo Noguchi (JPN)	11.772
2	Lee Hung-ying (TPE)	9.702
5	Futaba Ito (JPN)	10.318
3	Sa Sol (KOR)	9.612
4	Kim Ja-in (KOR)	11.071

Semifinals
1	Assel Marlenova (KAZ)	9.526
LL	Futaba Ito (JPN)	12.600
2	Lee Hung-ying (TPE)	9.209
3	Sa Sol (KOR)	9.165

Final
1	Assel Marlenova (KAZ)	9.303
3	Sa Sol (KOR)	9.294
Small final
LL	Futaba Ito (JPN)	Fall
2	Lee Hung-ying (TPE)	9.493

- Futaba Ito advanced to the semifinal as the loser with the best time (lucky loser).

==== Boulder ====
Rank	Athlete	Boulder				Result
Rank	Athlete	1	2	3	4	Result
1	Akiyo Noguchi (JPN)	T	T	T	T	4T12 4z6
2	Futaba Ito (JPN)	T	T	T	z	3T7 4z6
3	Kim Ja-in (KOR)	T	z	T	z	2T4 4z6
4	Sa Sol (KOR)	z	T	T	z	2T5 4z8
5	Lee Hung-ying (TPE)		z	T	z	1T2 3z10
6	Assel Marlenova (KAZ)		z			0T0 1z3

==== Lead ====
Rank	Athlete	Result	Time
1	Kim Ja-in (KOR)	Top	
2	Akiyo Noguchi (JPN)	40+	
3	Sa Sol (KOR)	37+	
4	Futaba Ito (JPN)	36+	
5	Lee Hung-ying (TPE)	23+	
6	Assel Marlenova (KAZ)	12+	

==== Summary ====
Rank	Athlete	Speed	Boulder	Lead	Total
1st place, gold medalist(s)	Akiyo Noguchi (JPN)	6	1	2	12
2nd place, silver medalist(s)	Sa Sol (KOR)	1	4	3	12
3rd place, bronze medalist(s)	Kim Ja-in (KOR)	5	3	1	15
4	Futaba Ito (JPN)	4	2	4	32
5	Assel Marlenova (KAZ)	2	6	6	72
6	Lee Hung-ying (TPE)	3	5	5	75
