= Kido Station =

Railway station in Naraha, Fukushima Prefecture, Japan

Kido Station 木戸駅
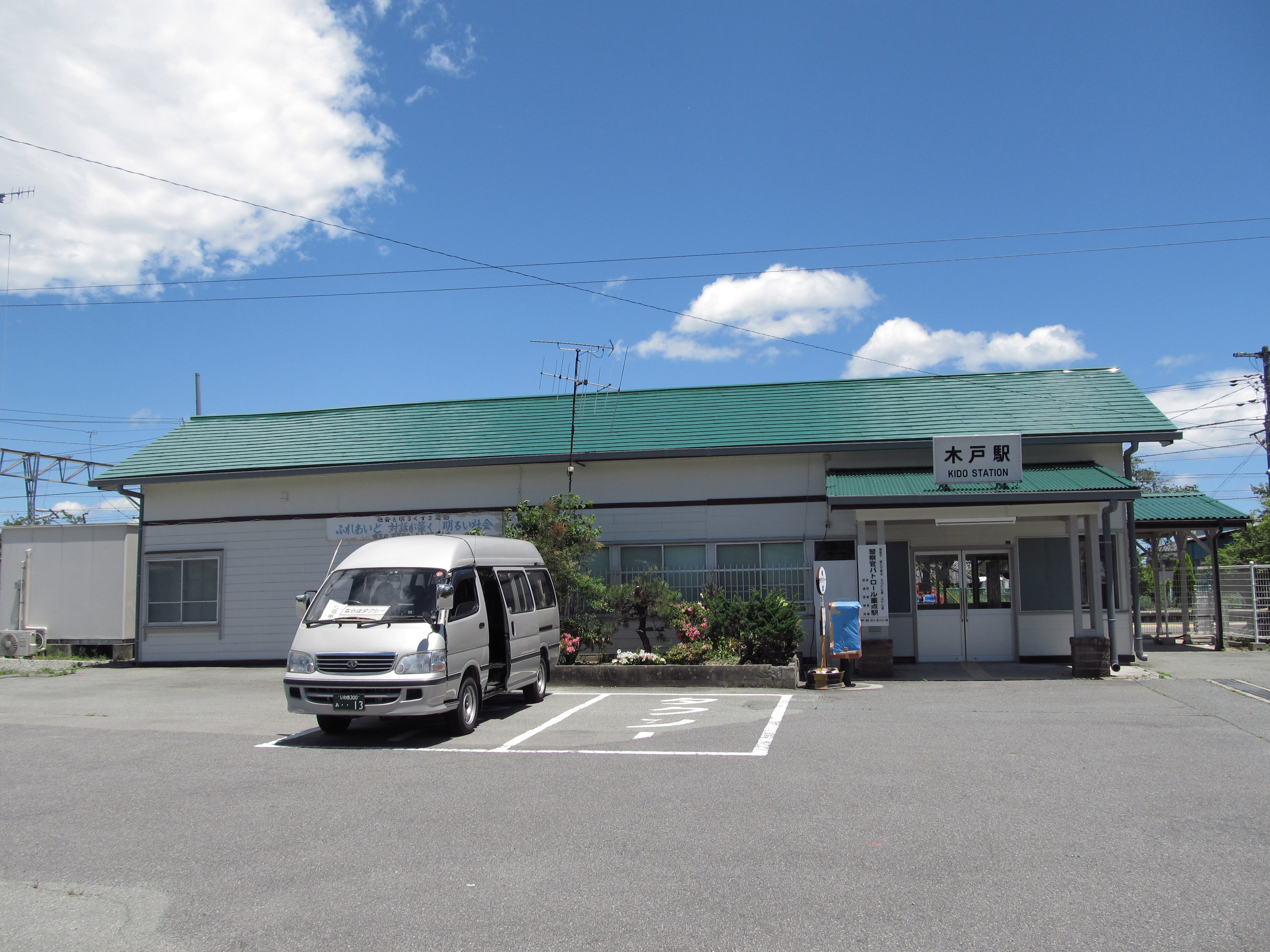
- Kido Station, June 2014

General information
- Location: Yamadaoka, Naraha-machi, Futaba-gun, Fukushima-ken 979-0513; Japan
- Coordinates: 37.2579°N 141.0027°E
- Operator: JR East
- Line: ■ Jōban Line
- Distance: 237.8 km from Nippori
- Platforms: 2 side platforms
- Tracks: 2

Other information
- Status: Unstaffed
- Website: Official website

History
- Opened: August 23, 1898

Passengers
- FY2010: 145 daily

Services
Preceding station	JR East	Following station
J-Village towards Shinagawa	Jōban Line Local-Futsuu	Tatsuta towards Sendai
Location
- Location within Fukushima Prefecture Location within Japan

Kido Station (木戸駅, Kido-eki) is a railway station located in the town of Naraha, Fukushima Prefecture, Japan, operated by the East Japan Railway Company (JR East).

== Lines ==
Kido Station is served by the Jōban Line, and is located 237.8 km from the official starting point of the line at Nippori Station.

== Station layout ==
The station has two opposed side platforms connected by a footbridge. The station is unattended.

=== Platforms ===
1	■ Jōban Line	for Tomioka
2	■ Jōban Line	for Iwaki and Mito

== History ==
Kido Station opened on August 23, 1898. The station was absorbed into the JR East network upon the privatization of the Japanese National Railways (JNR) on April 1, 1987.

Due to the Fukushima Daiichi nuclear disaster in 2011, operations were halted. Operations south of the station were resumed on June 1, 2014.

== Surrounding area ==
Tatsuta is within the evacuation zone surrounding the Fukushima Daiichi Nuclear Power Plant. Since August 2012 it has been possible to enter the area, but remaining in the area overnight is prohibited.

- Road Station Naraha
- Kido Post Office
- National Route 6
- Hirono Power Station
