= J-Village Station =

Railway station in Naraha, Fukushima Prefecture, Japan

J-Village Station Jヴィレッジ駅
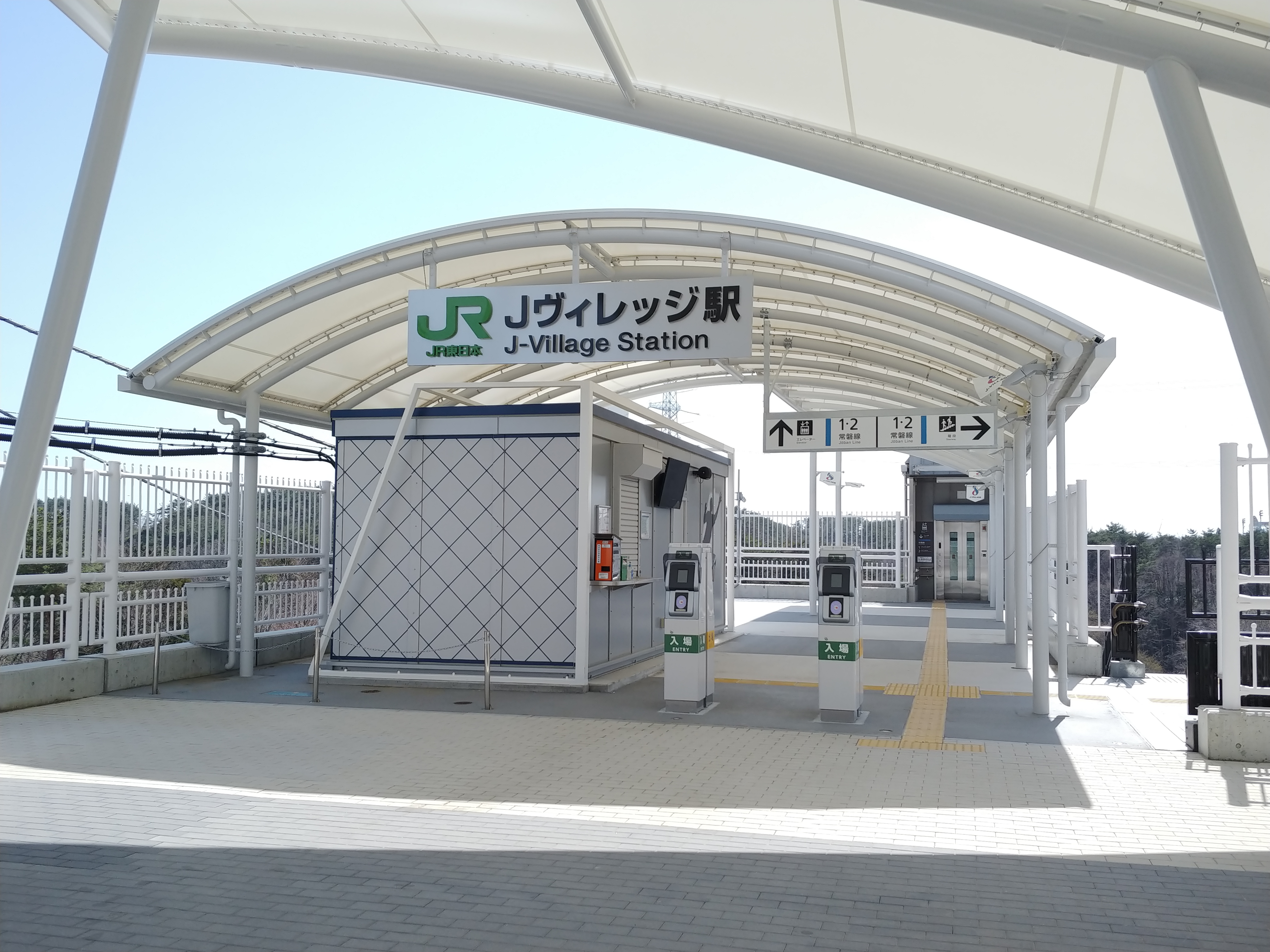
- View of the station entrance (21 March 2020)

General information
- Location: Shimoiwasawa-1, Yamadaoka, Naraha-machi, Futaba-gun, Fukushima-ken 979-0513; Japan
- Coordinates: 37.2431°N 141.0077°E
- Operator: JR East
- Line: ■ Jōban Line
- Distance: 235.9 km from Nippori
- Platforms: 2 side platforms
- Tracks: 2

Construction
- Structure type: At-grade

Other information
- Status: Unstaffed
- Website: Official website

History
- Opened: 20 April 2019

Passengers
- FY2019: 9,996 daily

Services
| Preceding station | JR East | Following station |
|---|---|---|
| Hirono towards Shinagawa | Jōban Line Local-Futsuu | Kido towards Sendai |
Location
- Location within Fukushima Prefecture Location within Japan

J-Village Station (Jヴィレッジ駅) is a railway station in the town of Naraha, Futaba District, Fukushima Prefecture, Japan, operated by the East Japan Railway Company (JR East). It was opened on 20 April 2019.

== Lines served ==
J-Village Station is served by the Jōban Line. It is 235.9 km from the official starting point of the Jōban Line at Nippori Station.

== Station layout ==
The station consists of two side platforms serving two tracks. Due to the location of the station between the tracks (which enter separate tunnels immediately north), the side platforms are positioned to resemble an island platform. The platforms are built at a length of 215m which can accommodate 10-car trains, including Limited Express services. Ramps and elevators are also available for passengers, especially wheelchair users.

The station is unstaffed. The station building was constructed 170m away from the east entrance to the J-Village Stadium, facing Naraha. A 400m² plaza was built in front of the station.

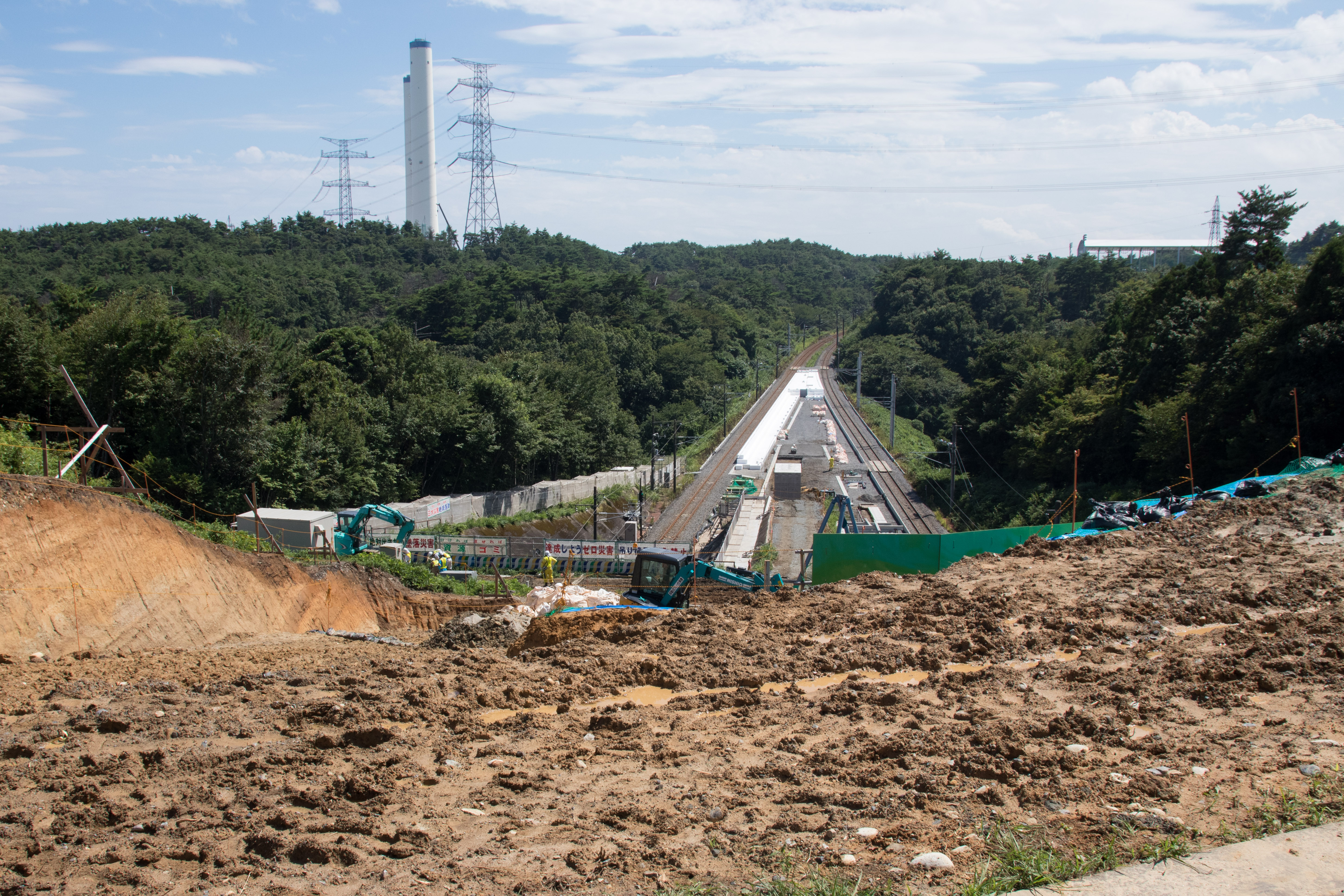
Station building under construction (Aug 2018)

== History ==
- 28 March 2018: Construction approved by Ministry of Land, Infrastructure, Transport and Tourism.
- 22 May 2018: Groundbreaking ceremony.
- 11 Oct 2018: Station name finalised as J-Village Station.
- 20 April 2019: Opened as a seasonal station.
- 14 March 2020: The station's status was changed to become a permanent station.

== See also ==
- J-Village Stadium
