= Bouldering at the 2018 IFSC Climbing World Cup =

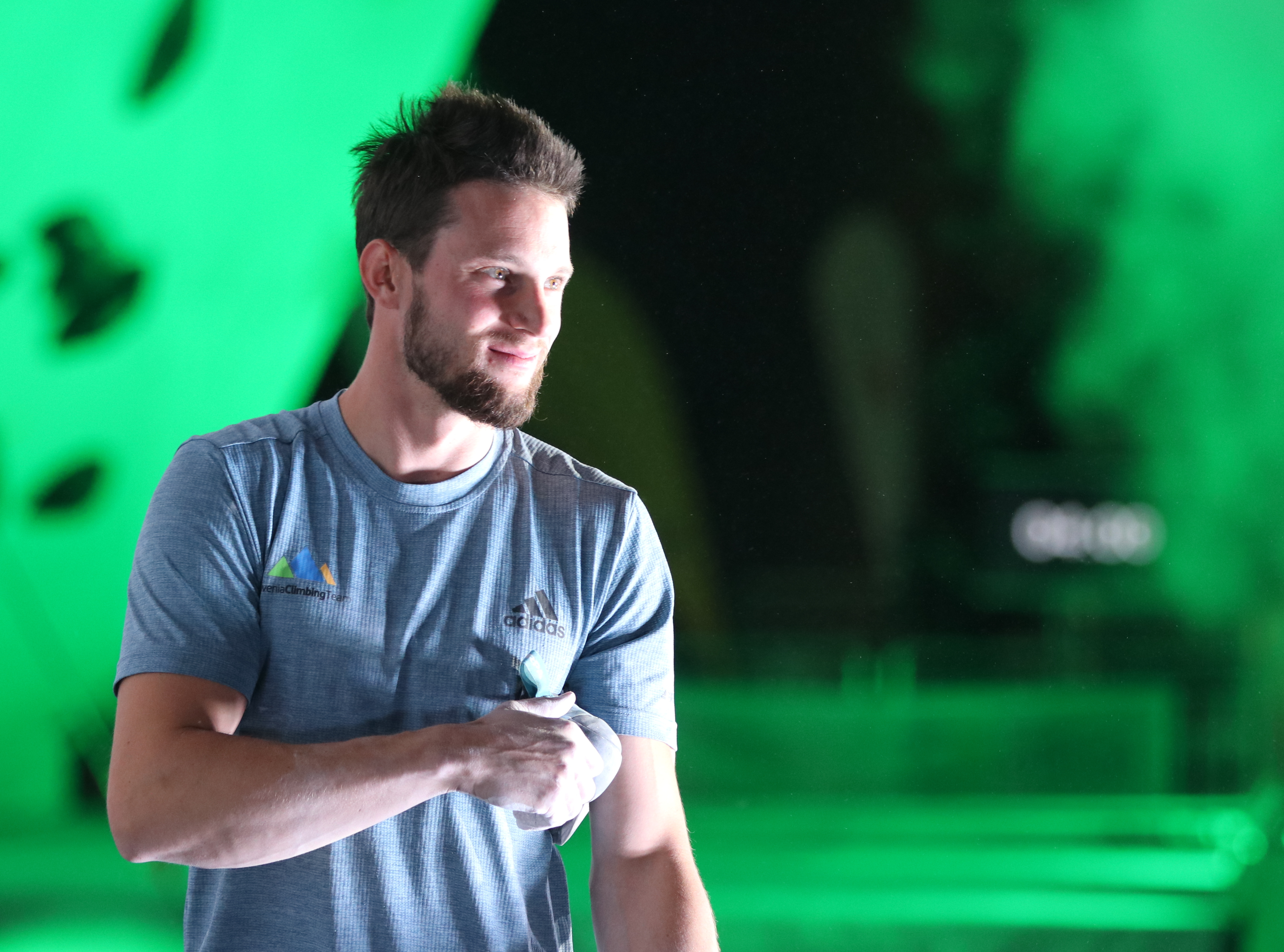
- Jernej Kruder, SLO winner of the world cup season
- Location: Meiringen, Switzerland Moscow, Russia; Chongqing, China; Tai'an, China; Hachiōji, Japan; Vail, United States Munich, Germany
- Dates: 13 April – 18 August 2018

Champions
- Men: (Slovenia) Jernej Kruder
- Women: (Japan) Miho Nonaka

The 2018 season of the IFSC Climbing World Cup was the 20th season of the competition. Bouldering competitions were held at seven stops of the IFSC Climbing World Cup. The bouldering season began on April 13 at the World Cup in Meiringen, and concluded on 18 August with the World Cup in Munich. At each stop a qualifying was held on the first day of the competition, and the semi-final and final rounds are conducted on the second day of the competition. The winners were awarded trophies, and the best three finishers received medals. At the end of the season an overall ranking was determined based upon points, which athletes were awarded for finishing in the top 30 of each individual event. Jernej Kruder won the seasonal title in the men's competition and Miho Nonaka won the women's. Japan won the national team competition.

== Changes from the previous season ==
For the 2018 season the IFSC changed the scoring method for its tournaments. Previously topped boulders were the deciding factor, followed as tiebreakers in decreasing order of importance: attempts to tops, bonus holds (renamed to zones), and attempts to bonus holds. The first and second tiebreakers switched places which means that the results were determined by tops, zones, attempts to tops, and attempts to zones.

Also athletes now need to demonstrate firm control of the two starting hand holds. Previously touching all four marked start points in any manner was deemed sufficient to start an attempt.

== Overall ranking ==
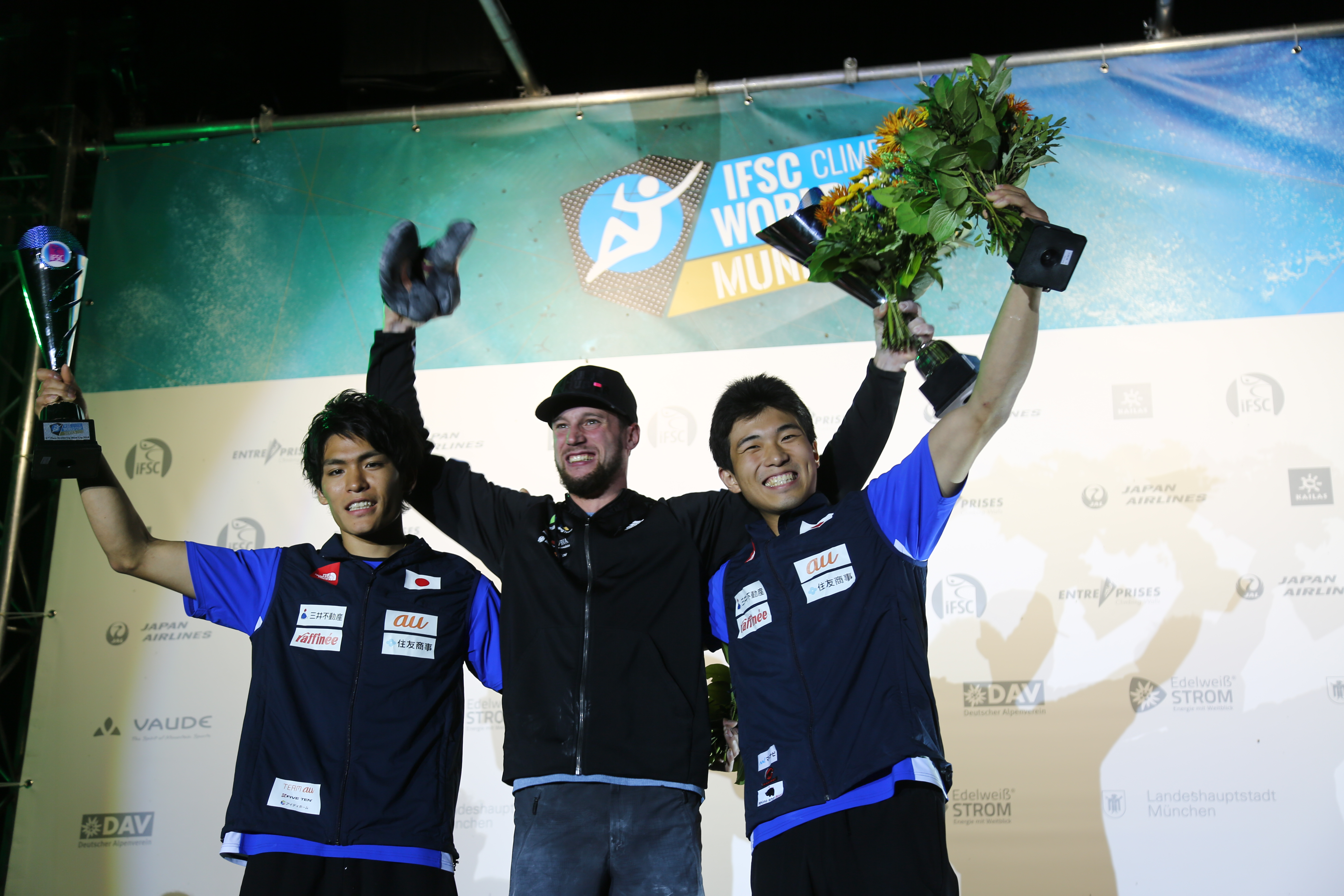
Winners 2018 Men: 1st place: Jernej Kruder, 2nd place: Tomoa Narasaki, 3rd place: Rei Sugimoto

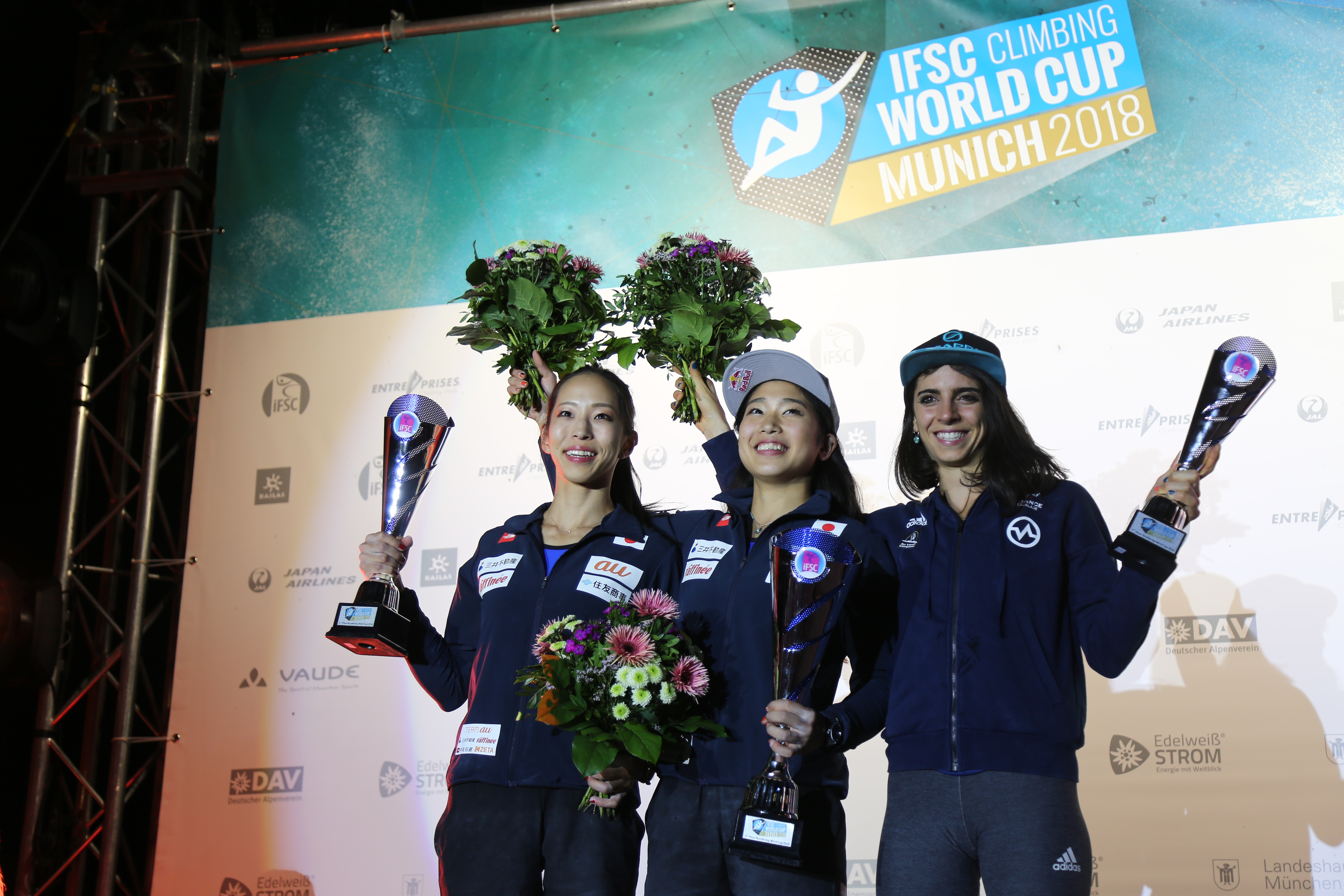
Winners 2018 Women: 1st place: Miho Nonaka, 2nd place: Akiyo Noguchi, 3rd place: Fanny Gibert

The overall ranking was determined based upon points, which athletes were awarded for finishing in the top 30 of each individual event. There were seven competitions in the season, but only the best six attempts were counted. The national ranking was the sum of the points of that country's three best male and female athletes. Results displayed (in brackets) were not counted.

=== Men ===
The results of the ten most successful athletes of the Bouldering World Cup 2018:

Rank	Name	Points	Munich	Vail	Hachiōji	Tai'an	Chongqing	Moscow	Meiringen
1	(Slovenia) Jernej Kruder	442.00	2. 80.00	4. 55.00	8. (38.00)	2. 80.00	6. 47.00	2. 80.00	1. 100.00
2	(Japan) Tomoa Narasaki	400.00	9. 35.00	3. 65.00	2. 80.00	8. 40.00	11. (31.00)	1. 100.00	2. 80.00
3	(Japan) Rei Sugimoto	334.00	8. 40.00	1. 100.00	3. 65.00	4. 55.00	12. (28.00)	10. 34.00	8. 40.00
4	(Russia) Alexey Rubtsov	296.00	14. (23.00)	9. 37.00	5. 51.00	12. 27.00	3. 65.00	5. 51.00	3. 65.00
5	(Slovenia) Gregor Vezonik	280.00	1. 100.00	14. 24.00	—	3. 65.00	13. 26.00	3. 65.00	—
6	(Japan) Kokoro Fujii	260.00	7. 43.00	18. (16.00)	16. 20.00	5. 51.00	1. 100.00	17. 18.00	12. 28.00
7	(South Korea) Jongwon Chon	247.00	—	7. 43.00	4. 55.00	6. 47.00	—	4. 55.00	6. 47.00
8	(Japan) Tomoaki Takata	218.00	17. 18.00	6. 47.00	11. 31.00	10. 34.00	25. (5.00)	9. 37.00	5. 51.00
9	(Japan) Yuji Fujiwaki	207.00	5. 51.00	8. 40.00	13. 26.00	11. 31.00	15. 22.00	28. (3.00)	9. 37.00
9	(Austria) Jakob Schubert	207.00	3. 65.00	—	—	12. 27.00	4. 55.00	25. 5.00	4. 55.00

=== Women ===
The results of the ten most successful athletes of the Bouldering World Cup 2018:

Rank	Name	Points	Munich	Vail	Hachiōji	Tai'an	Chongqing	Moscow	Meiringen
1	(Japan) Miho Nonaka	500.00	2. 80.00	2. 80.00	2. 80.00	2. 80.00	2. 80.00	2. (80.00)	1. 100.00
2	(Japan) Akiyo Noguchi	495.00	3. 65.00	3. 65.00	1. 100.00	1. 100.00	1. 100.00	3. 65.00	3. (65.00)
3	(France) Fanny Gibert	320.00	4. 55.00	4. 55.00	7. 43.00	3. 65.00	8. (40.00)	5. 51.00	5. 51.00
4	(Slovenia) Janja Garnbret	280.00	1. 100.00	—	—	—	—	1. 100.00	2. 80.00
5	(Slovenia) Katja Kadic	246.00	5. 51.00	23. (7.00)	11. 31.00	7. 43.00	6. 47.00	10. 34.00	8. 40.00
6	(Serbia) Staša Gejo	222.00	—	—	4. 55.00	4. 55.00	3. 65.00	15. 22.00	13. 25.00
7	(Russia) Ekaterina Kipriianova	210.00	6. 47.00	—	3. 65.00	10. 34.00	4. 55.00	21. 9.00	—
8	(Japan) Futaba Ito	179.00	7. 43.00	—	6. 47.00	13. 26.00	16. 20.00	8. 40.00	27. 3.00
9	(United Kingdom) Shauna Coxsey	174.00	—	7. 43.00	9. 37.00	—	—	6. 47.00	6. 47.00
10	(Germany) Alma Bestvater	168.00	12. 28.00	6. 47.00	5. 51.00	23. 7.00	12. 28.00	23. 7.00	—

=== National Teams ===
The results of the ten most successful countries of the Bouldering World Cup 2018:

Country names as used by the IFSC

Rank	Name	Points	Munich	Vail	Hachiōji	Tai'an	Chongqing	Moscow	Meiringen
1	(Japan)	2269	(337)	387	419	363	371	362	367
2	Slovenia	1344	345	(108)	109	208	139	310	233
3	France	823	163	(91)	102	111	197	93	157
4	Austria	735	173	61	(22)	110	154	64	173
5	(Russia) Russian Federation	591	85	(37)	144	101	121	72	68
6	Germany	534	103	143	69	58	112	49	(27)
7	United States	503	15	284	86	57	9	(3)	52
8	(South Korea) Republic of Korea	418	0	81	75	89	—	98	75
9	(United Kingdom) Great Britain	366	21	74	101	30	(19)	47	93
10	Italy	269	22	(1)	139	24	7	48	29

== Meiringen, Switzerland (13–14 April) ==
=== Women ===
99 athletes attended the World Cup in Meiringen. Miho Nonaka (4T4z 5 5) won the competition in front of Janja Garnbret (4T4z 7 5).

Rank	Name	Score
1	(Japan) Miho Nonaka	4T4z 5 5
2	(Slovenia) Janja Garnbret	4T4z 7 5
3	(Japan) Akiyo Noguchi	4T4z 9 9
4	(Austria) Sandra Lettner	3T4z 5 5
5	(France) Fanny Gibert	3T3z 4 3
6	(United Kingdom) Shauna Coxsey	2T4z 5 11

=== Men ===
109 athletes attended the World Cup in Meiringen. Jernej Kruder (3T4z 7 8) won the competition in front of Tomoa Narasaki (2T4z 3 7).

Rank	Name	Score
1	(Slovenia) Jernej Kruder	3T4z 7 8
2	(Japan) Tomoa Narasaki	2T4z 3 7
3	(Russia) Alexey Rubtsov	2T4z 5 13
4	(Austria) Jakob Schubert	2T3z 7 8
5	(Japan) Tamoaki Takata	1T3z 3 5
6	(South Korea) Jongwon Chon	1T2z 1 2
7	(France) Manuel Cornu	0T3z 0 9

== Moscow, Russia (21–22 April) ==
=== Women ===
100 athletes attended the World Cup in Moscow. Janja Garnbret (4T4z 7 5) won the competition in front of Miho Nonaka (4T4z 7 5), thereby reversing their finish order from Meiringen. As Garnbret and Nonoka achieved identical scores in the final their semi-final scores were used to determine final standings. Akiyo Noguchi, Fanny Gibert, and Shauna Coxsey came in 3rd, 5th, and 6th respectively, thus repeating their exact results from Meiringen. Petra Klingler completed the final in 4th place.

Rank	Name	Score
1	(Slovenia) Janja Garnbret	4T4z 7 5
2	(Japan) Miho Nonaka	4T4z 7 5
3	(Japan) Akiyo Noguchi	3T4z 8 9
4	(Switzerland) Petra Klingler	3T4z 9 10
5	(France) Fanny Gibert	2T3z 2 3
6	(United Kingdom) Shauna Coxsey	1T3z 4 6

=== Men ===
109 athletes attended the World Cup in Moscow. Tomoa Narasaki (4T4z 12 12) won the competition in front of Jernej Kruder (3T4z 5 6). Thus –as in the women's competition– the winner and runner-up from Meiringen switched places. Jongwon Chon and Alexey Rubtsov also managed back to back final appearances.

Rank	Name	Score
1	(Japan) Tomoa Narasaki	4T4z 12 12
2	(Slovenia) Jernej Kruder	3T4z 5 6
3	(Slovenia) Gregor Vezonik	3T4z 6 9
4	(South Korea) Jongwon Chon	3T4z 9 18
5	(Russia) Alexey Rubtsov	2T4z 4 27
6	(Italy) Gabriele Moroni	2T3z 7 14

== Chongqing, China (5–6 May) ==
The Chongqing World Cup was held outdoors and is affected by humidity to a greater extent than the European hosted World Cups. A lightning storm before the semi-finals made conditions difficult for climbers. The routesetting used a large number of volumes which exhausted Gecko King's inventory.

=== Women ===
47 athletes attended the World Cup in Chongqing. Akiyo Noguchi (4T4z 5 5) won the competition in front of Miho Nonaka (3T3z 7 7). They led from the start as the only two competitors to top the first problem, a burly overhang with a feet first start. Janja Garnbret and Shauna Coxsey, who had made the finals of both previous World Cups did not attend Chongqing.

Notably Gejo finished in front of Kipriianova for the bronze medal, a result that would have been reversed under the old scoring rules. This was the first time that results under the new system, which weights zones (bonuses) above attempts, differed from that of the old system.

Rank	Name	Score
1	(Japan) Akiyo Noguchi	4T4z 5 5
2	(Japan) Miho Nonaka	3T3z 7 7
3	(Serbia) Staša Gejo	1T3z 2 7
4	(Russia) Ekaterina Kipriianova	1T1z 1 1
5	(Austria) Jessica Pilz	1T1z 2 1
6	(Slovenia) Katja Kadic	1T1z 4 4

=== Men ===
83 athletes attended the World Cup in Chongqing. Of the four final problem the first one was flashed by all competitors, and the fourth yielded no points for anyone, thus the final standings were effectively decided by the second and fourth boulder only. Kokoro Fujii (3T3z 9 8) won the competition in front of Sean McColl (2T3z 2 4). Jernej Kruder and Alexey Rubtsov had their third straight finals appearances this season. Jongwon Chon was not competing because of a scheduling clash with the South Korean Asian Games qualifications.

Rank	Name	Score
1	(Japan) Kokoro Fujii	3T3z 9 8
2	(Canada) Sean McColl	2T3z 2 4
3	(Russia) Alexey Rubtsov	2T3z 5 7
4	(Austria) Jakob Schubert	2T2z 2 2
5	(Germany) Jan Hojer	1T3z 1 3
6	(Slovenia) Jernej Kruder	1T2z 1 3

== Tai'an, China (12–13 May) ==
=== Women ===
47 athletes attended the World Cup in Tai'an. Just as in Chongqing Akiyo Noguchi (4T4z 5 5) and Miho Nonaka (4T4z 10 7) dominated the women's final, each finishing two tops ahead of the competition. Noguchi claimed her second straight win while Nonaka continued her streak of finishing at least second in each bouldering competition this season.

Shauna Coxsey, Janja Garnbret and Petra Klingler were not competing.

Rank	Name	Score
1	(Japan) Akiyo Noguchi	4T4z 5 5
2	(Japan) Miho Nonaka	4T4z 10 7
3	(France) Fanny Gibert	2T3z 6 7
4	(Serbia) Staša Gejo	1T3z 3 7
5	(Austria) Johanna Färber	1T3z 4 10
6	(United States) Kyra Condie	0T3z 0 5

=== Men ===
93 athletes attended the World Cup in Tai'an. The final was decided on the final problem after all climbers achieved scores on the first three problems. Alex Khazanov (3T4z 7 9) was the only athlete to top the last boulder, and thus won the World Cup in front of Jernej Kruder (2T4z 2 5), the only climber to reach all finals of the season.

Rank	Name	Score
1	(Israel) Alex Khazanov	3T4z 7 9
2	(Slovenia) Jernej Kruder	2T4z 2 5
3	(Slovenia) Gregor Vezonik	2T4z 4 10
4	(Japan) Rei Sugimoto	2T4z 4 10
5	(Japan) Kokoro Fujii	2T4z 7 5
6	(South Korea) Jongwon Chon	2T3z 6 6

== Hachioji, Japan (2–3 June) ==
=== Women ===
68 athletes attended the World Cup in Hachioji. As in the two preceding World Cups Akiyo Noguchi (3T3z 5 5) won in front of Miho Nonaka (3T3z 6 6). After the World Cup Noguchi and Nonaka thus led the competition for the seasonal title by a sufficient margin to leave only them in contention for first and second place.

Rank	Name	Score
1	(Japan) Akiyo Noguchi	3T3z 5 5
2	(Japan) Miho Nonaka	3T3z 6 6
3	(Russia) Ekaterina Kipriianova	2T2z 6 5
4	(Serbia) Staša Gejo	0T2z 0 5
5	(Germany) Alma Bestvater	0T2z 0 6
6	(Japan) Futaba Ito	0T1z 0 9

=== Men ===
91 athletes attended the World Cup in Hachioji. Gabriele Moroni (2T4z 3 6) won his first World Cup in his career of more than ten years. Tomoa Narasaki (1T3z 1 6) came in second. Jernej Kruder missed the finals for the first time in the season.

Rank	Name	Score
1	(Italy) Gabriele Moroni	2T4z 3 6
2	(Japan) Tomoa Narasaki	1T3z 1 6
3	(Japan) Rei Sugimoto	1T3z 4 8
4	(South Korea) Jongwon Chon	1T2z 2 6
5	(Russia) Alexey Rubtsov	0T2z 0 4
6	(Japan) Kai Harada	0T1z 0 8

== Vail, United States (8–9 June) ==
=== Women ===
58 athletes attended the World Cup in Vail. Alex Puccio (3T3z 6 4) won, attending her first World Cup of the 2018 season. The second place went to Miho Nonaka (2T3z 3 4), who continued her streak of finishing at least second in all World Cups of the season. The winner of the three previous World Cups, Akiyo Noguchi (1T3z 2 6), came in third, winning her tenth consecutive medal at Bouldering World Cups.

Rank	Name	Score
1	(United States) Alex Puccio	3T3z 6 4
2	(Japan) Miho Nonaka	2T3z 3 4
3	(Japan) Akiyo Noguchi	1T3z 2 6
4	(France) Fanny Gibert	1T1z 5 2
5	(United States) Kyra Condie	0T2z 0 4
6	(Germany) Alma Bestvater	0T1z 0 8

=== Men ===
91 athletes attended the World Cup in Vail. Rei Sugimoto (3T4z 4 5) won in front of Sean Bailey (2T4z 2 6).

Rank	Name	Score
1	(Japan) Rei Sugimoto	3T4z 4 5
2	(United States) Sean Bailey	2T4z 2 6
3	(Japan) Tomoa Narasaki	2T4z 3 5
4	(Slovenia) Jernej Kruder	0T4z 0 7
5	(Japan) Ryuichi Murai	0T4z 0 8
6	(Japan) Tomoaki Takata	0T3z 0 15

== Munich, Germany (17–18 August) ==
=== Women ===
102 athletes attended the World Cup in Munich. Janja Garnbret (4T4z 4 4) won, solving each problem in her first attempt. The second place went to Miho Nonaka (4T4z 5 5), who thus claimed the overall Bouldering World Cup title. The third place in Munich and the second place overall went to Akiyo Noguchi (4T4z 7 6).

Rank	Name	Score
1	(Slovenia) Janja Garnbret	4T4z 4 4
2	(Japan) Miho Nonaka	4T4z 5 5
3	(Japan) Akiyo Noguchi	4T4z 7 6
4	(France) Fanny Gibert	1T4z 1 8
5	(Slovenia) Katja Kadic	1T2z 1 5
6	(Russia) Ekaterina Kipriianova	0T3z 0 5

=== Men ===
128 athletes attended the World Cup in Munich. The seasonal overall Bouldering title was decided after the semi-finals when Tomoa Narasaki failed to advance to the finals. Jernej Kruder thus secured the overall title regardless of his eventual finish in the Munich men's final. Gregor Vezonik (2T4z 2 13) won the competition with Kruder (2T3z 9 7) coming second and Jakob Schubert (2T3z 9 11) finishing in third place.

Rank	Name	Score
1	(Slovenia) Gregor Vezonik	2T4z 2 13
2	(Slovenia) Jernej Kruder	2T3z 9 7
3	(Austria) Jakob Schubert	2T3z 9 11
4	(Japan) Yoshiyuki Ogata	2T3z 11 13
5	(Japan) Yuji Fujiwaki	2T2z 5 5
6	(France) Mickaël Mawem	1T2z 1 3
