= Futaba, Fukushima =

Futaba 双葉町
- Town
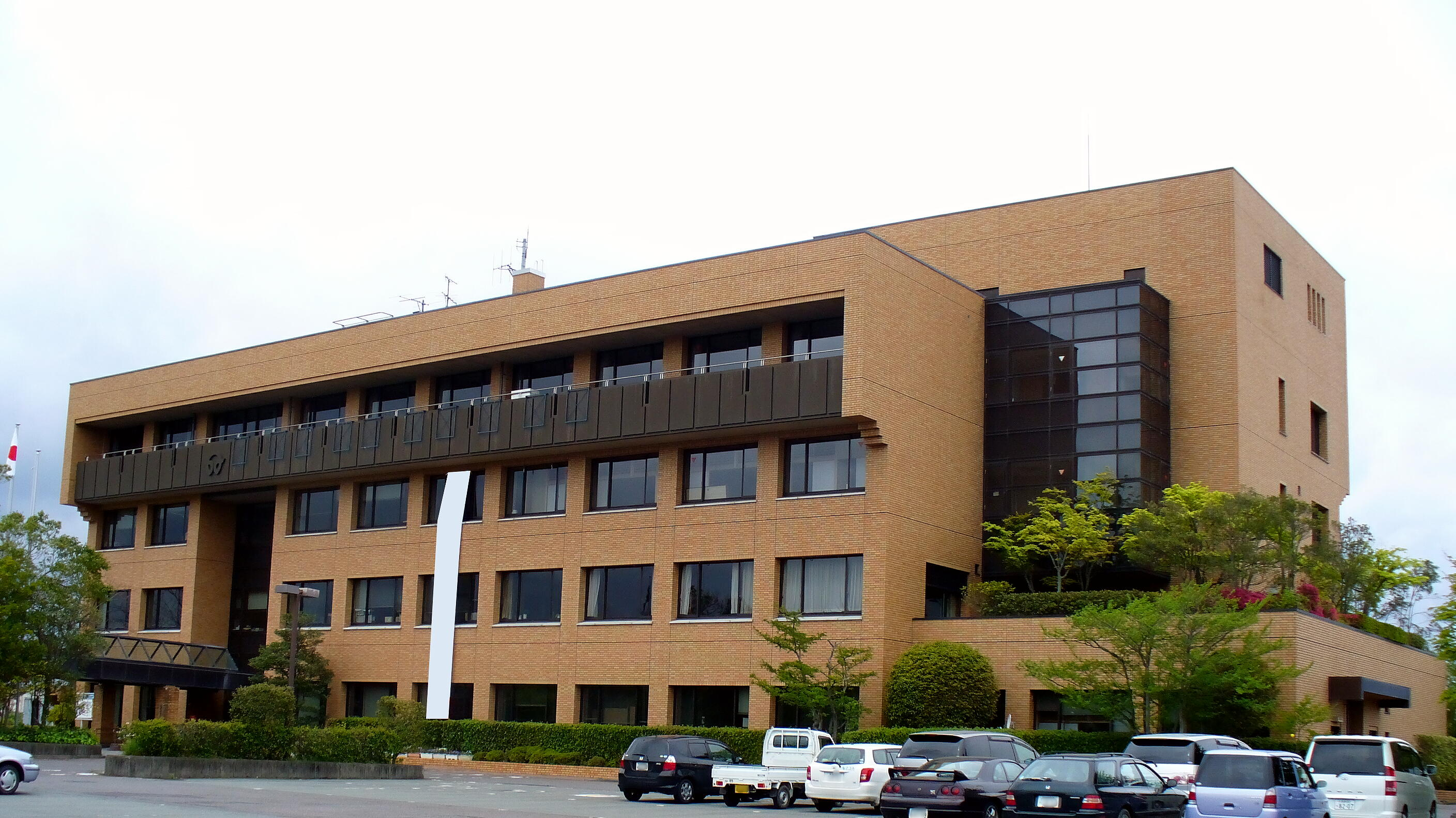
- Futaba Town Hall in 2008 (before Fukushima nuclear disaster)

- Flag Seal

- Location of Futaba in Fukushima Prefecture

- Coordinates: 37°26′56.9″N 141°00′44.4″E
- Country: Japan
- Region: Tōhoku
- Prefecture: Fukushima
- District: Futaba

Area
  - Total: 51.42 km^{2} (19.85 sq mi)

Population (March 24, 2025)
  - Total: 180
  - Density: 3.5/km^{2} (9.1/sq mi)
- Time zone: UTC+9 (Japan Standard Time)
- City symbols
  - Tree: Melia azedarach
  - Flower: Sakura
  - Bird: Green pheasant
- Phone number: 0246-84-5200
- Address: Shinzan Maeoki 28, Futaba-machi, Futaba-gun, Fukushima-ken 979-1495
- Website: Official website

Futaba (双葉町, Futaba-machi) is a town in Fukushima Prefecture, Japan. As of 24 March 2025, the town had an actual population of 180, although the official registered population was 5,300 in 2,301 households. The total area of the town is 51.42 square kilometres (19.85 sq mi). As of March 2011, the entire population was evacuated as a result of the Fukushima Daiichi nuclear disaster. However in the decade since then, 3% of the town has been open to visitors and residents, with the first residents returning on a permanent basis as of February 2022.

== Geography ==
Futaba is on the Pacific Ocean coastline of central Fukushima. The Fukushima Daiichi Nuclear Power Plant, owned by the Tokyo Electric Power Company, is on the southern border of Futaba in the neighboring town of Ōkuma.

=== Surrounding municipalities ===
- Fukushima Prefecture
  - Namie
  - Ōkuma

== Demographics ==
Per Japanese census data, the population of Futaba was relatively stable until the nuclear disaster.

Historical population
Year	Pop.	±%
1960	7,836	—
1970	7,434	−5.1%
1980	8,017	+7.8%
1990	8,182	+2.1%
2000	7,645	−6.6%
2010	6,932	−9.3%
2015	0	−100.0%
2020	0	0.00%
2025	180	—

== Climate ==
Futaba has a humid subtropical climate (Köppen climate classification Cfa). The average annual temperature in Futaba is 12.4 °C (54.3 °F). The average annual rainfall is 1,311 mm (51.6 in) with September as the wettest month. The temperatures are highest on average in August, at around 24.6 °C (76.3 °F), and lowest in January, at around 1.9 °C (35.4 °F).

== History ==
The area of present-day Futaba was part of Mutsu Province. The remains of Kofun period burial mounds have been found in the area. During the Nara period, it was the center of ancient Futaba District in Iwaki Province During the Edo period, it was part of Sōma Domain, ruled by the Sōma clan until the Meiji restoration. Town records indicate that over 700 residents of the region died due to a tsunami in the 1611 Sanriku earthquake. The area was the site of the Battle of Iwaki during the Boshin War.

On April 1, 1889, with the establishment of the modern municipalities system, the villages of Shinzan and Nagatsuka were created in Shineha District, Fukushima, which subsequently became Futaba District in April 1896. Shinzan was raised to town status on February 1, 1913. Shinzan merged with Nagatsuka on April 1, 1951 becoming the town of Shineha, which changed its name to Futaba on April 1, 1956.

=== 2011 Tōhoku earthquake and tsunami ===
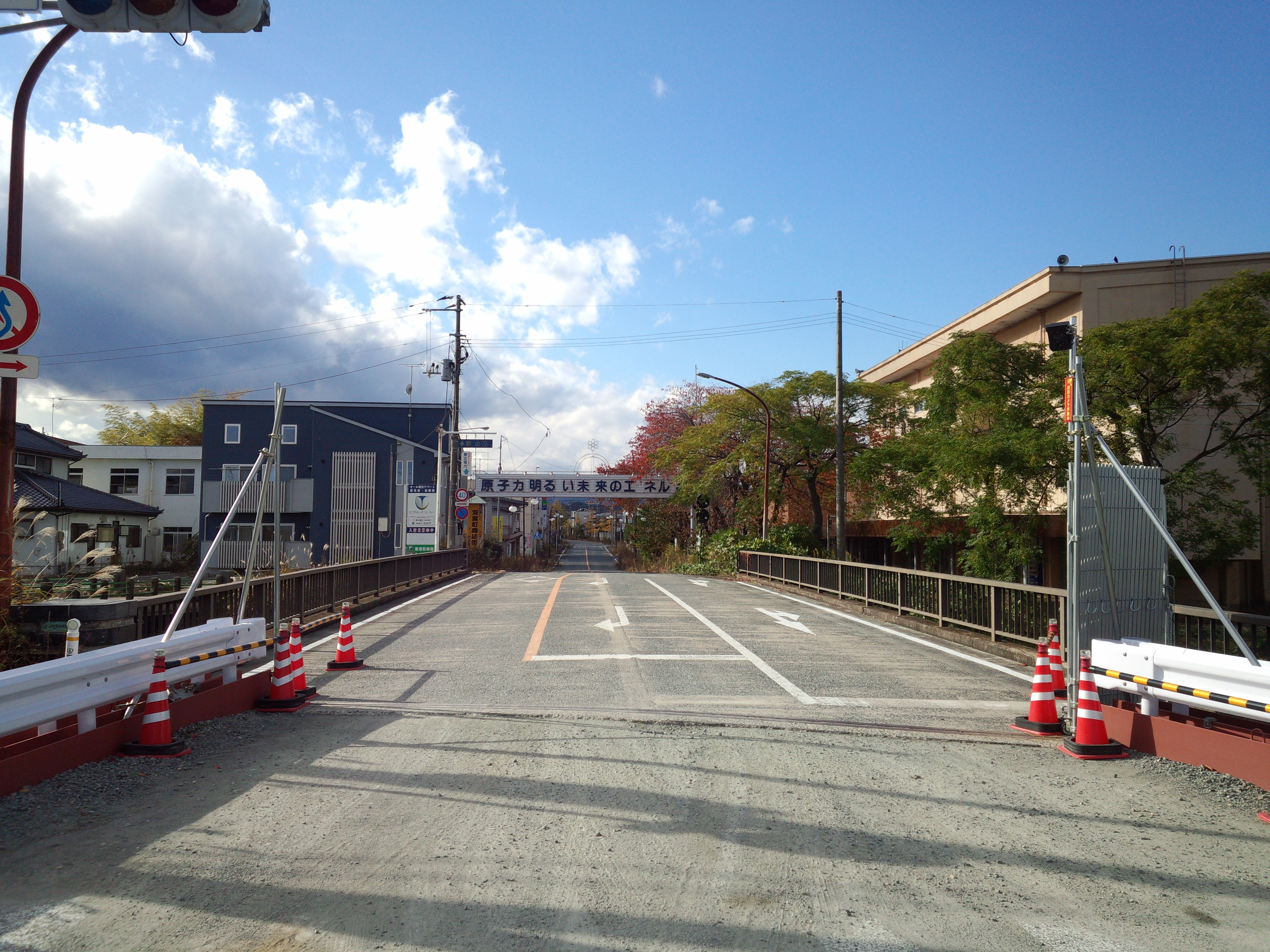
Entrance to Futaba with a now-derelict arch banner that reads "nuclear (power generation), a bright and future (source of) energy", 2013

Futaba was severely affected by the Fukushima Daiichi nuclear disaster, and the 2011 Tōhoku earthquake and tsunami on March 11, 2011. Besides sustaining considerable damage from the earthquake and the tsunami (which devastated the coastal area), the entire population of the town was evacuated en masse on the morning of March 12, as it is well within the 20 km (12 mi) exclusion radius around the damaged Fukushima Daiichi nuclear power plant.

On March 28, 2013, the central government rezoned the town into two areas according to level of radiation: in the first, people were free to go in and out but not allowed to stay overnight; in the second, all entry was forbidden because of elevated radiation levels that were not expected to go down within five years after the accident. However, only 4 percent of the town area zone was opened to daytime return of residents, and the town remained uninhabitable.

As of 2017, the Japanese government is leading a cleanup of the town, aiming for 11 percent to be livable by spring 2022. In March 2020, the town's train station was reopened as cleanup efforts continued, and an area of habitability of around one square mile was established around the station. Services between Futaba and the neighbouring towns of Namie and Naraha commenced on March 14, 2020.

In 2022, resettlement of the town commenced when the first three residents to return on a permanent basis arrived. It is planned to increase Futaba's population to 2,000 over the course of five years.

== Economy ==
The economy of Futaba was heavily dependent on commercial fishing and agriculture. Raising of carnations was a major industry.

== Education ==
Futaba has two public elementary schools and one public junior high school operated by the town government, and one public high school operated by the Fukushima Prefectural Board of Education. All schools remain closed.

== Transportation ==
=== Railway ===
- JR East – Jōban Line
  - Futaba

=== Highway ===
- Jōban Expressway - Tomioka Interchange
- National Route 6
- National Route 288

== Noted residents ==
- Kazunari Watanabe, Olympic cyclist

== Local attractions ==
- Kiyotosaku Cave Tombs, a National Historic Site with a kofun burial chamber decorated with murals
- The Great East Japan Earthquake and Nuclear Disaster Memorial Museum, this museum shows how Fukushima has dealt with a complex and unprecedented disaster and its ongoing consequences, and communicates lessons for the future on the importance of disaster prevention and mitigation.
