= Tatsuta Station =

Railway station in Naraha, Fukushima Prefecture, Japan

Tatsuta Station 竜田駅
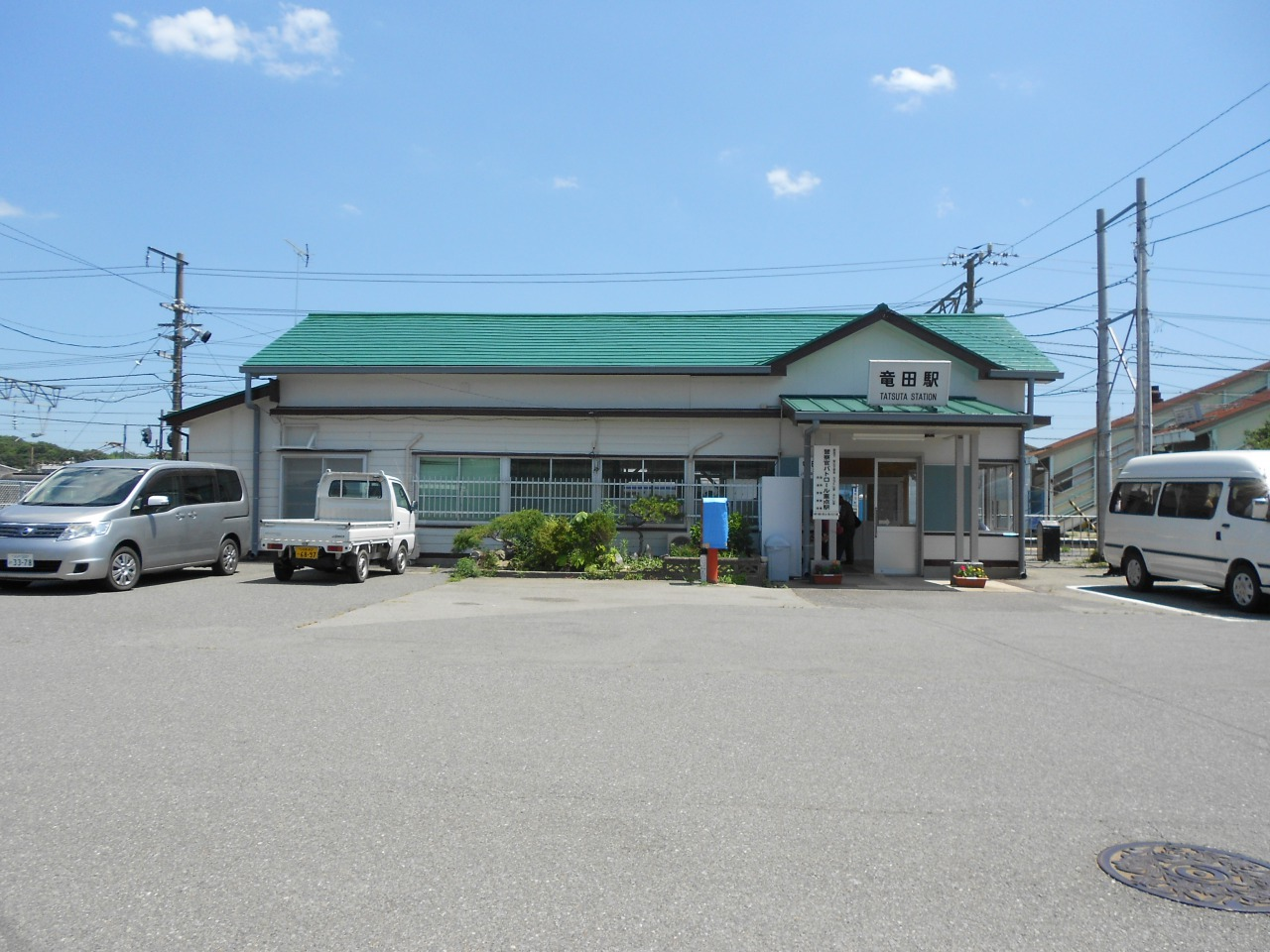
- Tatsuta Station building in August 2014

General information
- Location: Ide Kiya 126, Naraha-cho, Futaba-gun, Fukushima-ken 979-0603; Japan
- Coordinates: 37.2827°N 141.0026°E
- Operator: JR East
- Line: ■ Jōban Line
- Distance: 240.9 km from Nippori
- Platforms: 1 side + 1 island platform
- Tracks: 3

Other information
- Status: Staffed
- Website: Official website

History
- Opened: March 25, 1909

Passengers
- FY2019: 183 daily

Services
| Preceding station | JR East | Following station |
|---|---|---|
| Kido towards Shinagawa | Jōban Line Local-Futsuu | Tomioka towards Sendai |
Location
- Location within Fukushima Prefecture Location within Japan

Tatsuta Station (竜田駅, Tatsuta-eki) is a railway station located in the town of Naraha, Fukushima Prefecture, Japan, operated by the East Japan Railway Company (JR East).

== Lines ==
Tatsuta Station is served by the Jōban Line, and is located 240.9 km from the official starting point of the line at Nippori Station.

== Station layout ==
The station has a single island platform and a single side platform, connected to the station building by a footbridge. The station is staffed.

=== Platforms ===
| 1 | ■ Jōban Line | for Haranomachi, Soma and Sendai |
| 2 | ■ Jōban Line | for Iwaki |
| 3 | ■ Jōban Line | for Iwaki |

== History ==
On March 25, 1909, the station began operation. Passenger service began on April 25, 1909 after one month of freight service. The station was absorbed into the JR East network upon the privatization of the Japanese National Railways (JNR) on April 1, 1987.

Due to the Fukushima Daiichi nuclear disaster in 2011, operations were halted. Operations south of the station were resumed on June 1, 2014. Operations to Tomioka resumed on 21 September 2017.

== Passenger statistics ==
In fiscal 2018, the station was used by an average of 192 passengers daily (boarding passengers only). The passenger figures for previous years are as shown below.

| Fiscal year | Daily average |
|---|---|
| 2001 | 323 |
| 2005 | 282 |
| 2010 | 248 |
| 2015 | 117 |

== Surrounding area ==
Tatsuta is within the evacuation zone surrounding the Fukushima Daiichi Nuclear Power Plant. Since August 2012 it has been possible to enter the area, but remaining in the area overnight is prohibited.

- Naraha Town Hall
- Naraha Post Office
- National Route 6
