= Yonomori Station =

Railway station in Tomioka, Fukushima Prefecture, Japan

Yonomori Station 夜ノ森駅
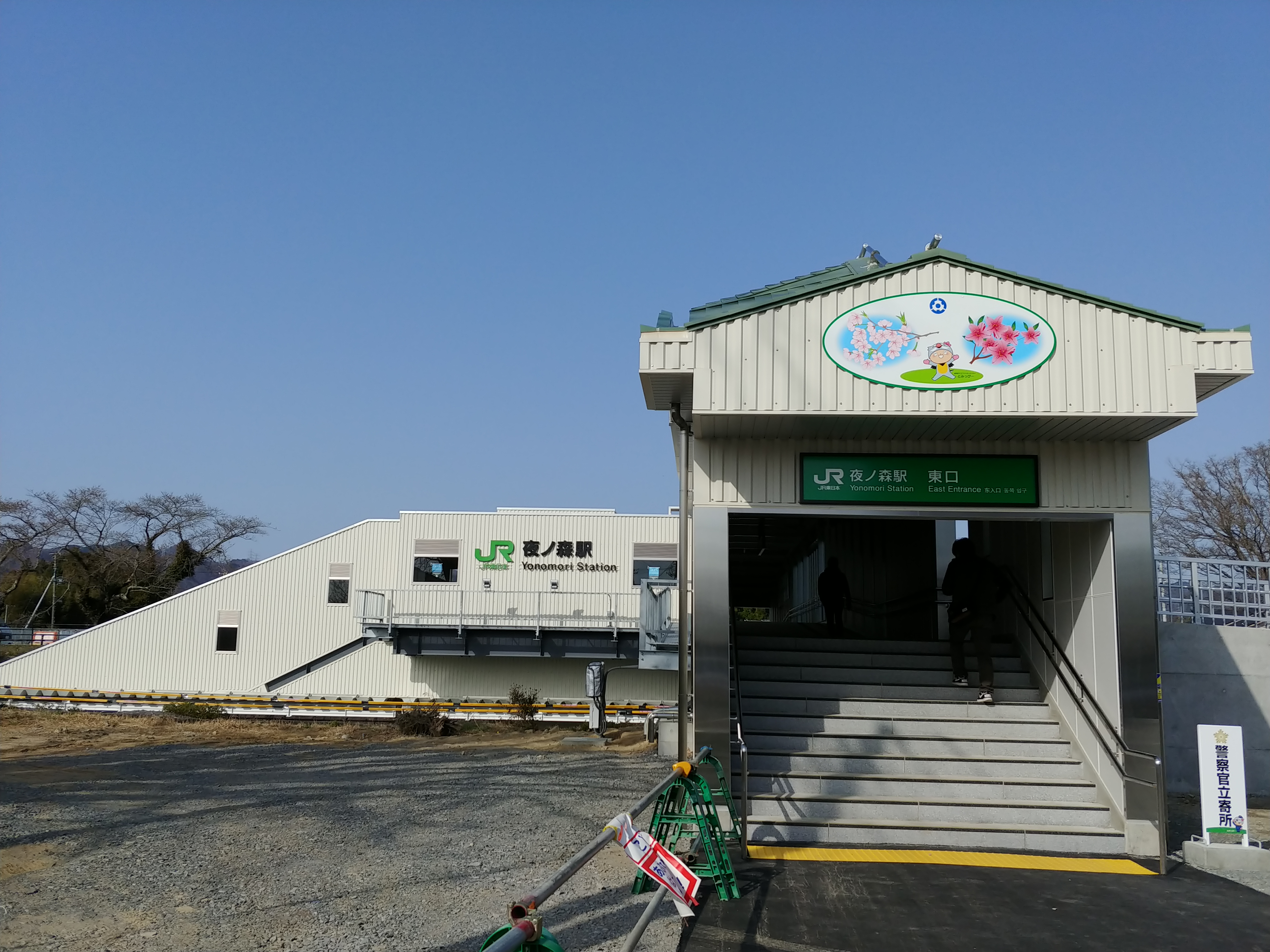
- Yonomori Station in March 2020

General information
- Location: Yonomori-Kita 1-33, Tomioka-cho, Futaba-gun, Fukushima-ken 979-1161; Japan
- Coordinates: 37.3659°N 140.9922°E
- Operator: JR East
- Line: ■ Jōban Line
- Distance: 253.0 km from Nippori
- Platforms: 1 island platform
- Tracks: 2

Other information
- Status: Unstaffed
- Website: Official website

History
- Opened: March 15, 1921

Passengers
- FY2010: 359 daily

Services
Preceding station	JR East	Following station
Tomioka towards Shinagawa	Jōban Line Local-Futsuu	Ōno towards Sendai
Location
- Location within Fukushima Prefecture Location within Japan

Yonomori Station (夜ノ森駅, Yonomori-eki) is a railway station in the town of Tomioka, Fukushima, Japan, operated by the East Japan Railway Company (JR East).

== Lines ==
Yonomori Station is served by the Jōban Line, and is located 253.0 km from the official starting point of the line at Nippori Station.

== Station layout ==
The station has one island platform with an elevated station building. The station is unattended.

== History ==
Yonomori Station was opened on 15 March 1921. The station was absorbed into the JR East network upon the privatization of the Japanese National Railways (JNR) on 1 April 1987. The station was closed on March 11, 2011, following the Fukushima Daiichi nuclear disaster, and was reopened on December 18, 2019, after rebuilding.

== Surrounding area ==
Yonomori is within the evacuation zone surrounding the Fukushima Daiichi Nuclear Power Plant. Since August 2012 it has been possible to enter the area to the west of the station, but remaining in the area overnight is prohibited. The station and the area to the east of the station remain off limits at all times due to high radiation levels. It reopened along with the rest of the exclusion zone on March 14, 2020.

- Yonomori Post Office
- National Route 6
