= Alannah Yip =

Canadian rock climber

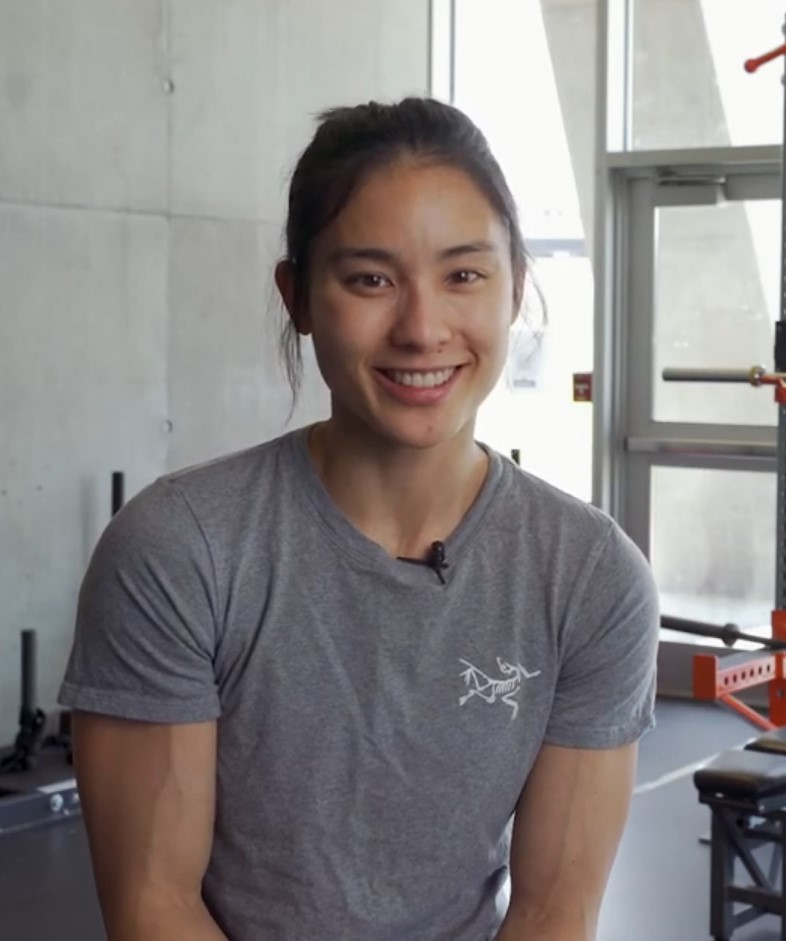

Personal information
- Born: October 26, 1993 (age 33) North Vancouver, British Columbia, Canada
- Education: University of British Columbia

Climbing career
- Type of climber: Competition climbing

Alannah Yip (born October 26, 1993) is a Canadian rock climber and former competition climber. She was the national champion in her age category when she was twelve. She won a gold medal at the Panamerican Climbing Championships 2020 in Los Angeles, which qualified her for the 2020 Summer Olympics in Tokyo. She retired from competition climbing in 2024.

== Life ==
Yip was born and raised in North Vancouver. Her mother is Scottish and her father is Chinese. She began climbing when she was nine when her godparent's children became interested in climbing. She won her first National Climbing Championship when she was twelve. She trained to be an engineer, specializing in mechatronics. She tried giving up climbing to concentrate on her university studies, but she realized that sport was essential. In 2015 she was able to visit Switzerland as part of her studies and she was able to practice climbing in her spare time with the Swiss national team. When she returned to Canada she began training with the "Climb Base 5" in preparation for the following years World Cup climbing events.

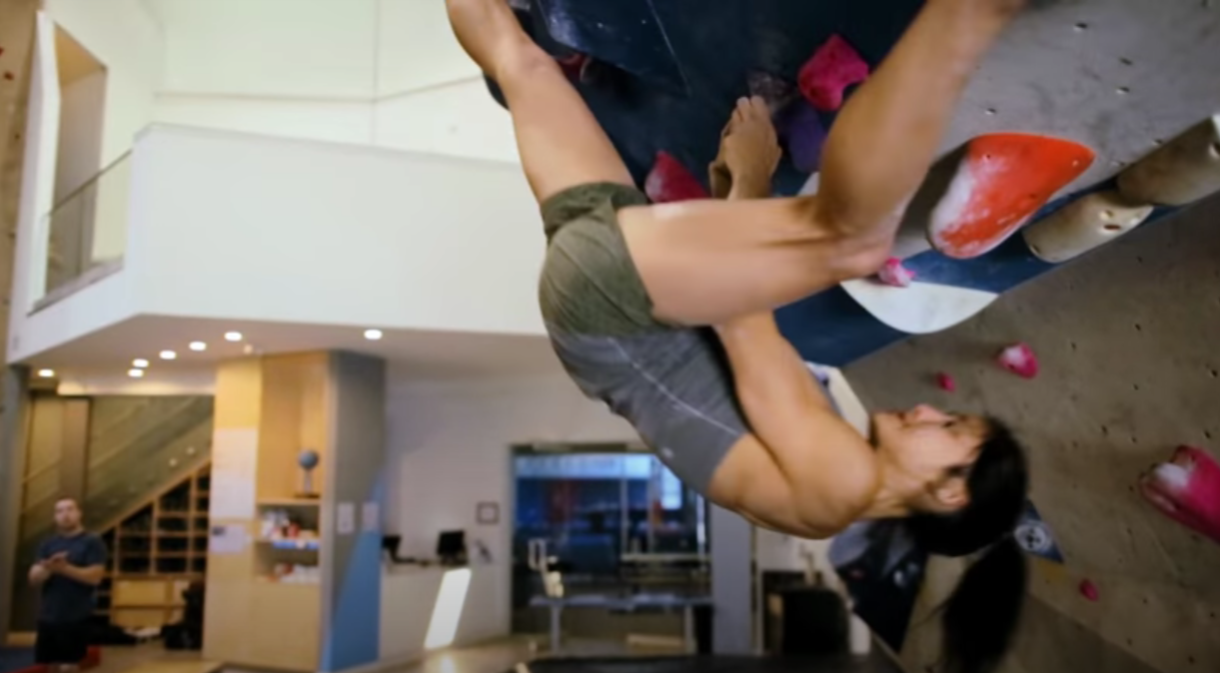
Alannah Yip practising climbing in 2018 at the gym Climb Base5 in Coquitlam, BC

Yip graduated with a Bachelor of Applied Science in mechanical engineering from the University of British Columbia in 2018.

Her coach was Andrew Wilson in 2018 and she has been supported by Petro-Canada. She qualified for a place in sport climbing at the 2020 Summer Olympics by winning the 2020 IFSC Pan-American Championships. She retired from competition climbing following her unsuccessful qualification campaign for the 2024 Paris Olympics, which was hampered by the emotional effects of dealing with alopecia universalis.

== Results ==
=== World championships ===
Discipline	2016	2018	2019
Bouldering	16	13	7
Lead climbing	43	51	38
Speed climbing	38	37	29
Combined		15	14

=== Pan American championships ===
Discipline	2020	2023
Combined	1	3
