= Futaba Station =

Railway station in Futaba, Fukushima Prefecture, Japan

Futaba Station 双葉駅
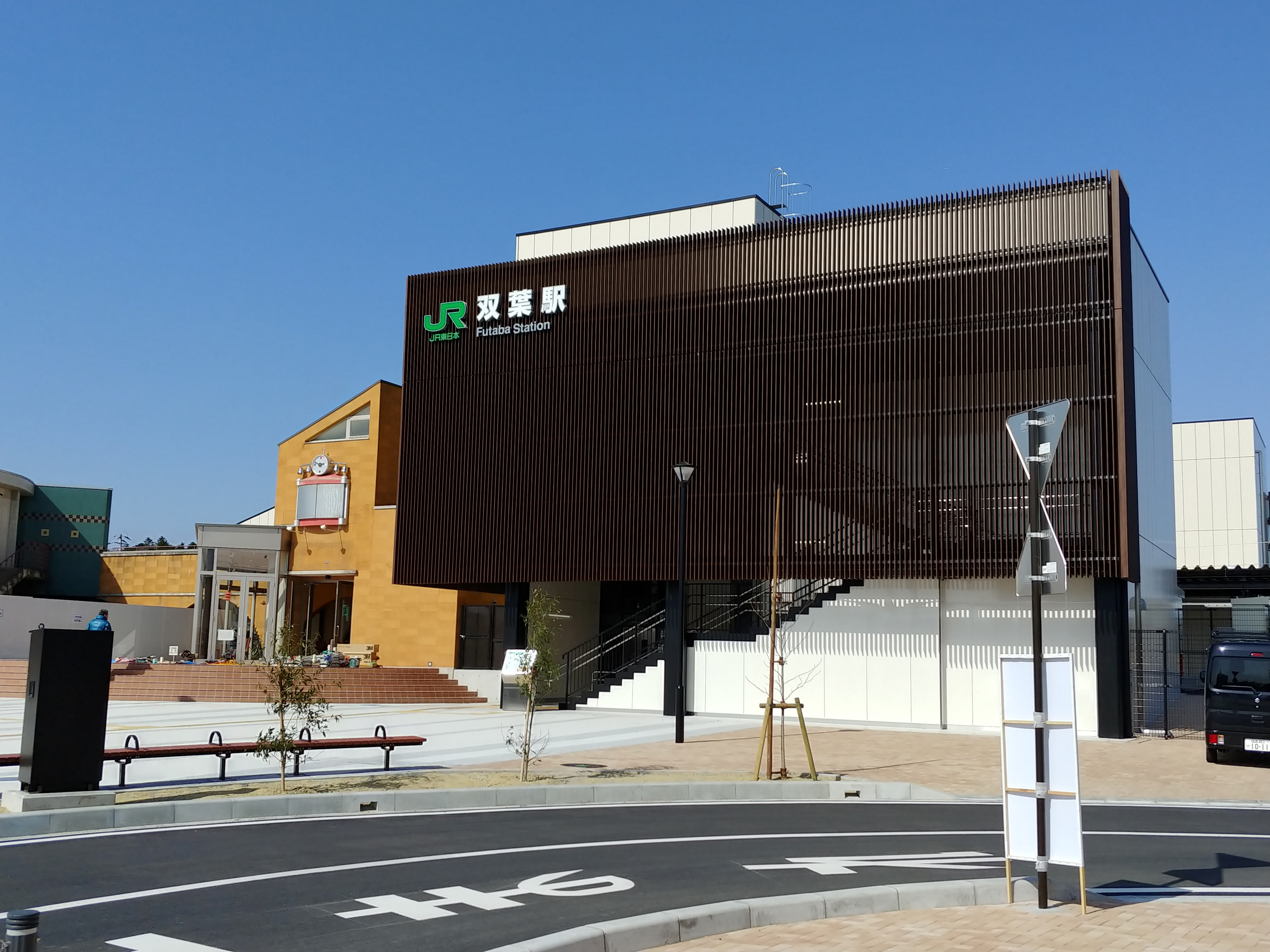
- Futaba Station in March 2020

General information
- Location: 3912 Machi-nishi, Nagatsuka, Futaba-machi, Futaba-gun, Fukushima-ken 979-1471; Japan
- Coordinates: 37.4535°N 141.0067°E
- Operator: JR East
- Line: ■ Jōban Line
- Distance: 263.7 km from Nippori
- Platforms: 1 side platforms
- Tracks: 1

Other information
- Status: unstaffed
- Website: Official website

History
- Opened: 23 August 1898; 128 years ago 14 March 2020; 6 years ago (after decontamination)
- Closed: 11 March 2011; 15 years ago (temporarily)
- Former names: Nagatsuka (until 1959)

Passengers
- FY2010: 542 daily

Services
Preceding station	JR East	Following station
Ōno towards Shinagawa	Hitachi	Namie towards Sendai
Ōno towards Shinagawa	Jōban Line Local-Futsuu	Namie towards Sendai
Location
- Location within Fukushima Prefecture Location within Japan

Futaba Station (双葉駅, Futaba-eki) is a railway station operated by East Japan Railway Company (JR East) in the town of Futaba, Fukushima, Japan.

== Lines ==
Futaba Station is served by the Jōban Line, and is located 263.7 km from the official starting point of the line at Nippori Station.

== Station layout ==
Futaba Station has one side platform connected to the station building overhead. Prior to the Fukushima Daiichi nuclear disaster in 2011, a second platform was in use and the station was staffed.

=== Platforms ===
1	■ Jōban Line	for Iwaki, Mito, and Shinagawa for Haranomachi and Sendai

== History ==
The station opened on 23 August 1898 as Nagatsuka Station (長塚駅). It was renamed Futaba in 1959. The station was absorbed into the JR East network upon the privatization of the Japanese National Railways (JNR) on 1 April 1987. The station was closed on 11 March 2011 following the Fukushima Daiichi nuclear disaster. Services between Namie and Tatsuta reopened on 14 March 2020.

== Passenger statistics ==
In fiscal 2010, the station was used by an average of 542 passengers daily (boarding passengers only).

== Surrounding area ==
Futaba is within the evacuation zone surrounding the Fukushima Daiichi Nuclear Power Plant. Since June 2015 it has been possible for residents to enter the area, but remaining in the area overnight is prohibited.

- Futaba Town Hall
- Futaba Post Office
- National Route 6

== See also ==
- List of railway stations in Japan
