= Futaba Dam =

Dam in Hokkaido Prefecture, Japan

- Location within Japan
- Interactive map of Futaba Dam
- Location: Hokkaido Prefecture, Japan
- Coordinates: 42°54′40″N 140°56′09″E
- Construction began: 1966
- Opening date: 1987

Dam and spillways
- Height: 61.4 m (201 ft)
- Length: 247.9 m (813 ft)

Reservoir
- Total capacity: 10450 thousand cubic meters
- Catchment area: 63.4 sq. km
- Surface area: 64 hectares

Futaba Dam (Japanese: 双葉ダム) is an asphalt dam located in Hokkaido Prefecture in Japan. The dam is used for irrigation. The catchment area of the dam is 63.4 km^{2}. The dam impounds about 64 ha of land when full and can store 10450 thousand cubic meters of water. The construction of the dam was started on 1966 and completed in 1987.
