= Futaba Ito =

Japanese climber (born 2002)

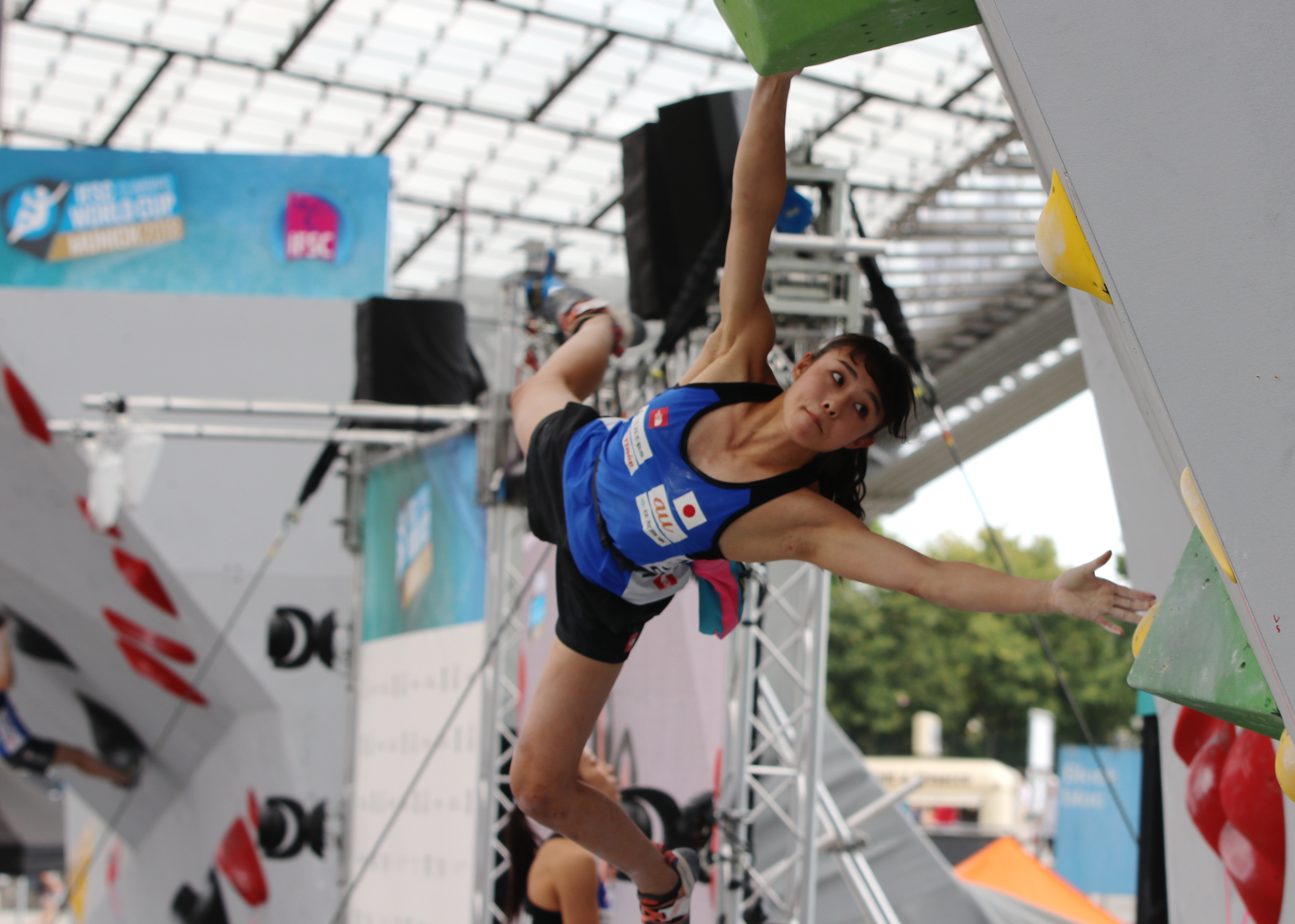
- Futaba Ito at the 2018 Climbing World Cup

Personal information
- Nationality: Japan
- Born: 25 April 2002 (age 24) Morioka, Iwate Prefecture, Japan
- Occupation: Professional competition climber
- Height: 162 cm (5 ft 4 in)
- Weight: 46 kg (101 lb)
- Website: http://futaba-ito.com/

Climbing career
- Type of climber: Competition bouldering, Competition lead climbing
Medal record
Women's competition climbing
Asian Championships
Gold medal – first place	2018 Kurayoshi	Bouldering
Gold medal – first place	2022 Seoul	Bouldering
Bronze medal – third place	2018 Kurayoshi	Combined
Bronze medal – third place	2022 Seoul	B&L
Bronze medal – third place	2024 Tai'an	Bouldering
Bronze medal – third place	2026 Meishan	Bouldering
World Youth Championships
Gold medal – first place	2017 Innsbruck (Youth B)	Lead
Silver medal – second place	2016 Guangzhou (Youth B)	Bouldering
Silver medal – second place	2018 Moscow (Youth A)	Lead
Bronze medal – third place	2017 Innsbruck (Youth B)	Bouldering
Bronze medal – third place	2017 Innsbruck (Youth B)	Combined
Bronze medal – third place	2018 Moscow (Youth A)	Bouldering

Futaba Ito (伊藤 ふたば, Ito Futaba; born 25 April 2002) is a Japanese professional competition climber, sport climber and boulderer. She participates in both competition bouldering and competition lead climbing events. She won the IFSC Climbing Asian Youth Championships in lead and bouldering events in 2016, as well as the Bouldering Japan Cup in 2017. She participated in combined and speed events at the 2018 Asian Games.

== Biography ==
Ito was born on 25 April 2002, in Morioka, Iwate Prefecture, Japan. She started climbing in her third year of elementary school, encouraged by her father, who did sport climbing as a hobby. Her talent was apparent from early on; on her first day of climbing, she reportedly surprised her father by climbing 15 meters up high without stopping, despite not having had any prior climbing experience.

She started taking part in public tournaments in 2014, when she came in second place at the 17th Junior Olympic Cup in the under-Youth B age group in lead climbing.

In 2015, she achieved victory in the Japan Youth Championships lead event (under-Youth B age group), and the All Japan Climbing Youth Championships Bouldering Tournament (Youth C). In the same year, she also won both the lead and bouldering events (Youth C) while representing Japan in the IFSC Climbing Asian Youth Championships in Putrajaya, Malaysia.

In 2016, she entered the All Japan Climbing Championships Lead Tournament, where she came 3rd in the girls' senior category and won the Youth B category. In November of the same year she represented Japan in the IFSC World Youth Championships in Guangzhou, China, where she came 2nd in bouldering in the girls' Youth B category.

In January 2017, Ito won the 12th Sport Climbing Bouldering Japan Cup, where she faced the more experienced Japanese climbers Akiyo Noguchi and Miho Nonaka. At 14 years and 9 months, Ito was youngest person ever to win the Japan Cup, beating Noguchi's 16 years and 3 months at the first Japan Cup in 2005. She was also the youngest athlete to represent Japan in the 2018 Bouldering World Cup, where she placed 8th.

In August 2018, she participated in combined and speed events at the Asian Games, held in Palembang, Indonesia.

In 2019, she won the Adidas Rockstars bouldering competition. In this event,t she defeated Janja Garnbret in the superfinal.

== Rankings ==
=== IFSC Climbing World Championships ===
	Hachioji 2019	Moscow 2021	Seoul 2025
Lead	14		
Bouldering	7	13	17
Speed	27		
Combined	7		

=== IFSC Climbing World Cup ===
	2018	2019	2021	2022	2023	2024	2025	2026
Lead	24	30	28	18	19	32		
Bouldering	8	4	8	4	13	24	17	14
Speed	48	41						
Combined	7	12		7	13			

=== IFSC Climbing Asian Championships ===
	Kurayoshi 2018	Seoul 2022	Tai'an 2024
Lead	10	4	
Bouldering	1	1	3
Speed	15		
Combined	3	3	

=== IFSC World Youth Championships ===
	2016 Youth B	2017 Youth B	2018 Youth A
Lead	9	3	2
Bouldering	2	1	3
Speed		34	21
Combined		3	
