= Nittaki Station =

Railway station in Sōma, Fukushima Prefecture, Japan

Nittaki Station 日立木駅
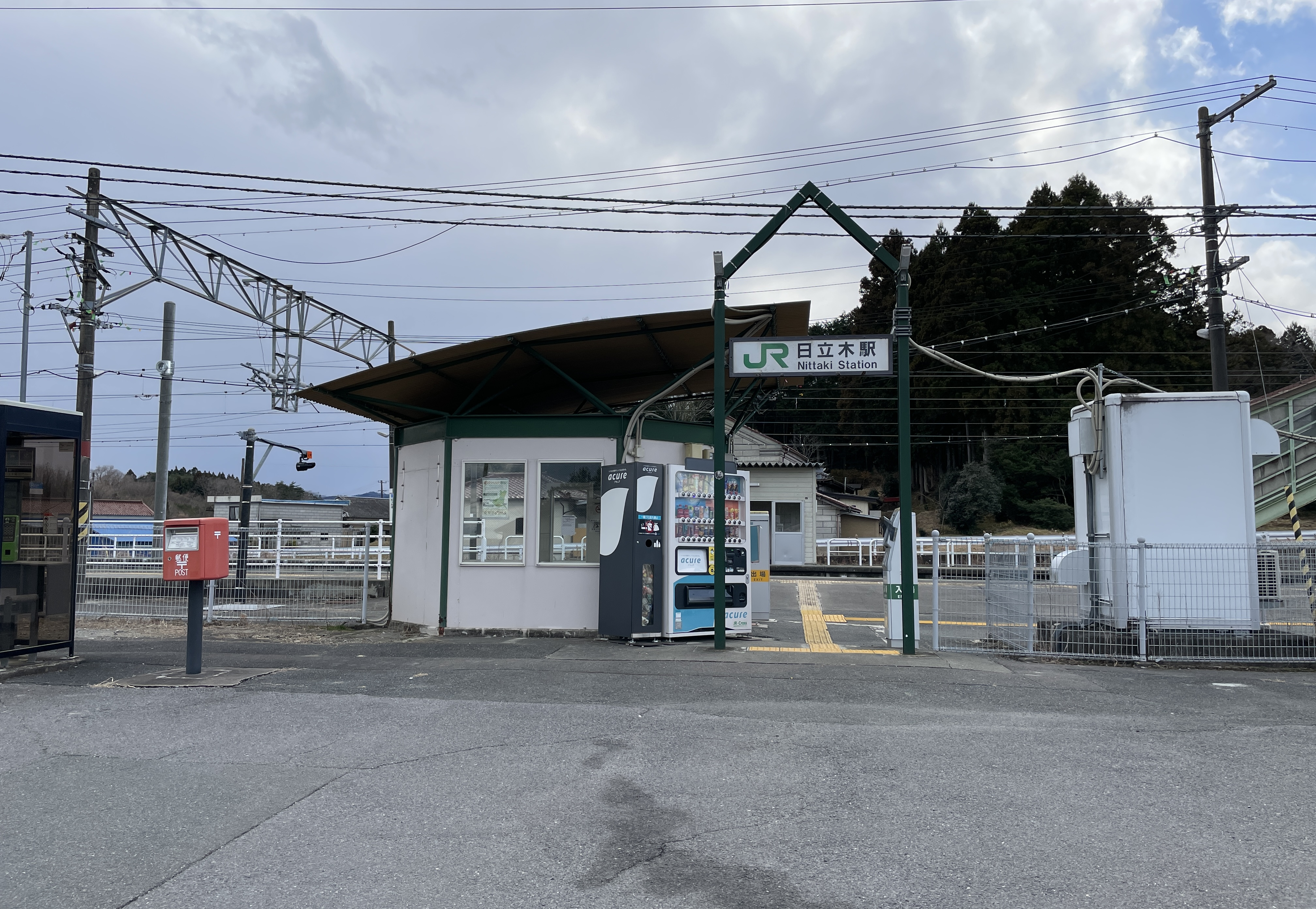
- Nittaki Station in December, 2022

General information
- Location: Kamiharada, Akagi, Sōma-shi, Fukushima-ken 979-2521; Japan
- Coordinates: 37.7561°N 140.9348°E
- Operator: JR East
- Line: ■ Jōban Line
- Distance: 301.1 km from Nippori
- Platforms: 1 side + 1 island platform
- Tracks: 3

Other information
- Status: Unstaffed
- Website: www.jreast.co.jp/estation/station/info.aspx?StationCd=1183

History
- Opened: 15 August 1922

Services
Preceding station	JR East	Following station
Kashima towards Shinagawa	Jōban Line Local-Futsu	Sōma towards Sendai
Location
- Location within Fukushima Prefecture Location within Japan

Nittaki Station (日立木駅, Nittaki-eki) is a railway station in the city of Sōma, Fukushima, Japan, operated by East Japan Railway Company (JR East).

== Lines ==
Nittaki Station is served by the Jōban Line, and is located 301.0 km from the official starting point of the line at Nippori in Tokyo. However, due to damage to the line caused by the 2011 Tōhoku earthquake and tsunami, trains from Nittaki were only able to travel as far as Namie Station. Operations were restored to Haranomachi Station on 21 December 2011, and full services on the line were resumed on 14 March 2020.

== Station layout ==
The station has a single side platform and an island platform connected to the station building by a footbridge. However, at present platform 3 is not in use. The station is unattended.

=== Platforms ===
1	■ Joban Line	for Haranomachi and Odaka
2	■ Joban Line	for Sōma and Sendai
3	■ Joban Line	(not in use)

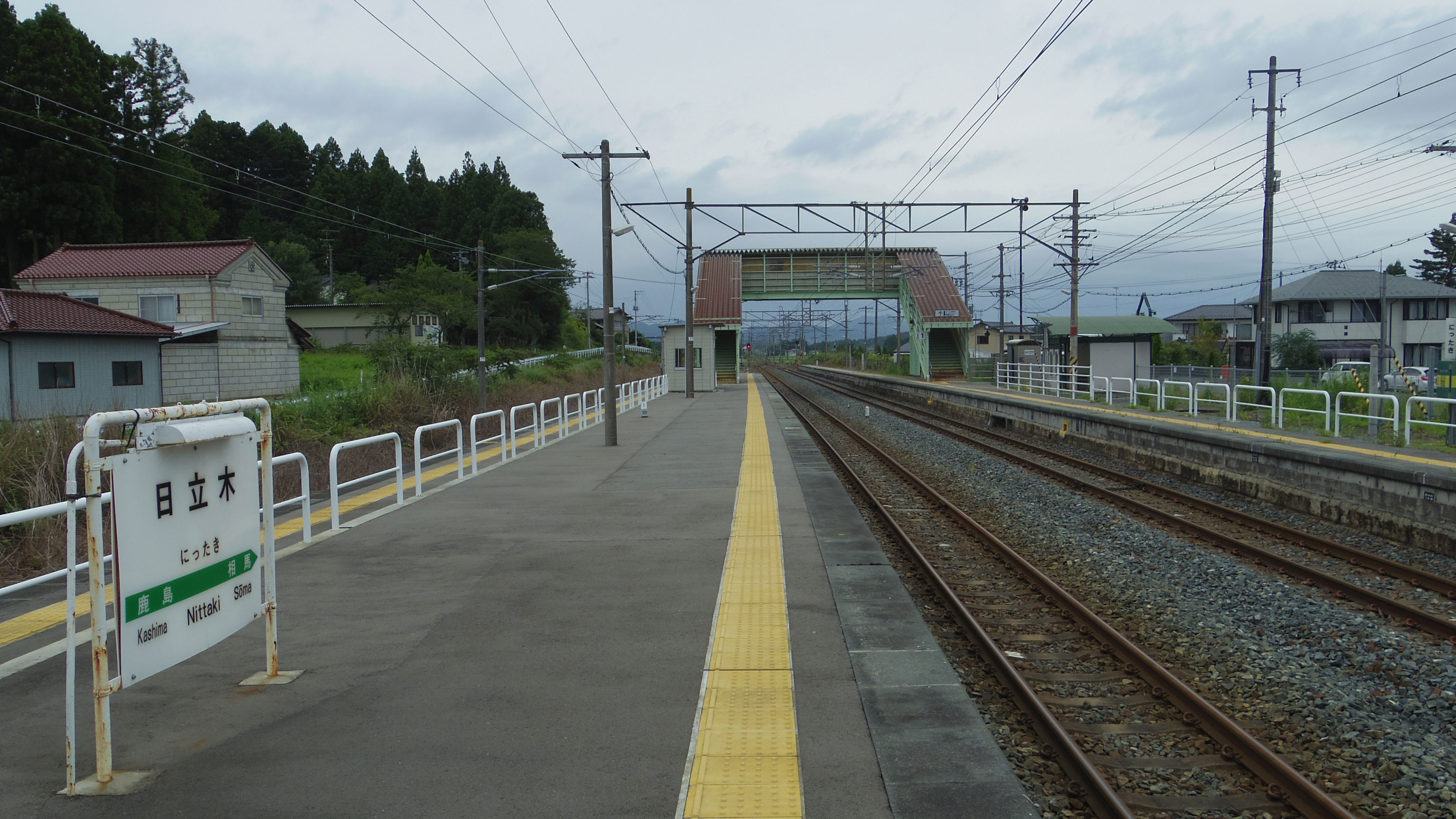
The platforms in August 2014

== History ==
Nittaki Station opened on 15 August 1922. The station was absorbed into the JR East network upon the privatization of the Japanese National Railways (JNR) on April 1, 1987.

== Surrounding area ==
- Sōma Roadside Station
- Niitaki Post Office
- Sōma Shrine

== See also ==
- List of railway stations in Japan
