= Odaka Station =

Railway station in Minamisōma, Fukushima Prefecture, Japan

Odaka Station 小高駅
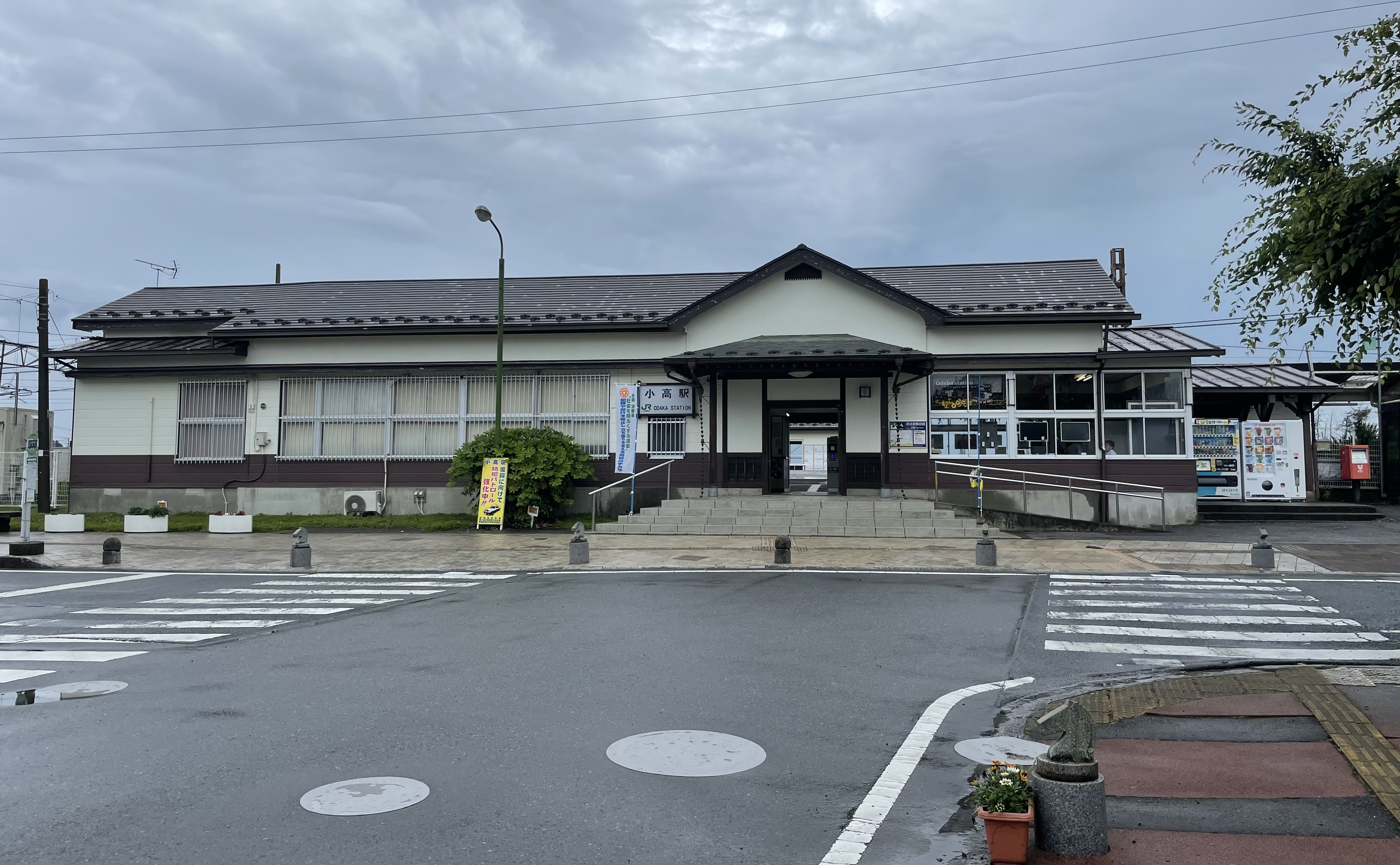
- Odaka Station in July 2022

General information
- Location: 1-140 Higashimachi, Odaka-ku, Minamisōma-shi, Fukushima-ken 979-2121; Japan
- Coordinates: 37.5630°N 140.9962°E
- Operator: JR East
- Line: ■ Jōban Line
- Distance: 277.5 km from Nippori
- Platforms: 2 side platforms
- Tracks: 2

Other information
- Status: Unstaffed
- Website: www.jreast.co.jp/estation/station/info.aspx?StationCd=380

History
- Opened: 11 May 1898

Passengers
- FY2018: 493 daily

Services
Preceding station	JR East	Following station
Momouchi towards Shinagawa	Jōban Line Local-Futsuu	Iwaki-Ōta towards Sendai
Location
- Location within Fukushima Prefecture Location within Japan

Odaka Station (小高駅, Odaka-eki) is a railway station in the city of Minamisōma, Fukushima, Japan, operated by East Japan Railway Company (JR East).

== Lines ==
Odaka Station is served by the Joban Line, and is located 277.5 km from the official starting point of the line at Nippori in Tokyo.

== Station layout ==
The station has two opposed side platforms connected to the station building by a footbridge. The station is Unstaffed. It became an unstaffed station from March 14, 2020.

=== Platforms ===
1	■ Jōban Line	for Haranomachi, Soma and Sendai
2	■ Jōban Line	for Namie, Tomioka, Iwaki, Takahagi, Hitachi and Mito

== History ==
Odaka Station opened on 11 May 1898. The station was absorbed into the JR East network upon the privatization of Japanese National Railways (JNR) on 1 April 1987. The station was closed on 11 March 2011 following the Fukushima Daiichi nuclear disaster. The station reopened on 12 July 2016 with the reopening of the section of the Joban Line between Odaka and Haranomachi. The section southward to Namie was scheduled to reopen in spring 2017, and resumed services on 1 April 2017.

== Passenger statistics ==
In fiscal 2018, the station was used by an average of 493 passengers daily (boarding passengers only).

== Surrounding area ==
- Former Odata Town Hall
- Odaka Post Office
- National Route 6

== See also ==
- List of railway stations in Japan
