= Kashima =

Kashima (鹿島) may refer to:

== Places in Japan ==
- Kashima District, Ibaraki, a district in Ibaraki Prefecture
  - Kashima, Ibaraki, a city in Ibaraki Prefecture
    - Kashima Soccer Stadium
      - Kashima Soccer Stadium Station, railway station
    - Kashima Power Station
    - Kashimajingū Station, railway station
    - Kashima-Ōno Station, railway station
    - Kashima Shrine, a Shinto shrine
- Kashima, Saga, a city in Saga Prefecture
  - Hizen-Kashima Station, railway station
  - Kashima Gatalympics, an annual sporting event
- Kashima, Kumamoto, a town in Kumamoto Prefecture
- Kashima, Shimane, a town in Shimane Prefecture
- Kashima, Fukushima, a former town in Fukushima Prefecture (now part of Minamisōma, Fukushima)
  - Kashima Station (Fukushima), railway station
- Kashima District, Ishikawa, a district in Ishikawa Prefecture
  - Kashima, Ishikawa, a former town in Ishikawa Prefecture (now part of Nakanoto, Ishikawa)
- Kashima, Kagoshima, a former village in Kagoshima Prefecture (now part of Satsumasendai, Kagoshima)
- Kashima Station (Osaka), a railway station in Yodogawa-ku, Osaka
- Kashima Domain, a historical tozama feudal domain of the Edo period
- Port of Kashima, seaport located in the cities of Kamisu and Kashima

== Martial arts and sport ==
- Kashima Antlers (from Kashima, Ibaraki), is a professional football club playing in the J1 League
- Brew Kashima (from Kashima, Saga), is an amateur football club playing in the Kyushu Football League
- Kashima Shin-ryū is a koryū martial art
- Kashima Shintō-ryū is a koryū martial art focusing on kenjutsu
- Kashima Shinden Jikishinkage-ryū is a koryū teaching kenjutsu

== Ships ==
=== Military ===
- Japanese battleship Kashima, a pre-dreadnought battleship operating from 1906 to 1924
- Japanese cruiser Kashima, a light cruiser operated from 1940 until 1947
- JDS Kashima (TV-3508), a Japan Maritime Self-Defense Force training vessel operated from 1995 to present

=== Civilian ===
- Kashima Maru (1913), a Japanese ocean liner that sailed from 1913 to 1943

== Other uses ==
- Kashima (god), a Shinto god who restrains the Namazu
- Kashima (surname)
- Kashima Railway Line, a closed railway line
- Kashima Reiko, a Japanese urban legend, similar to Teke Teke

== See also ==
- Kajima, the construction corporation, pronounced with a J instead of a SH sound
