= Urajiri Shell Mound =

Archaeological site in the Odaka area of Minamisōma, Fukuoka Prececture, Japan

Urajiri Shell Midden
- 浦尻貝塚 (Japanese)
- Urajiri Shell Midden Urajiri Shell Mound (Japan)
- 37°31′16″N 141°01′23″E
- Type: shell midden
- Periods: Jōmon period
- Location: Minamisōma, Fukushima, Japan
- Region: Tōhoku region

Site notes
- Public access: Yes

The Urajiri Shell Midden (浦尻貝塚, Urajiri kaizuka) is an archaeological site in the Odaka area of the city of Minamisōma, Fukushima Prefecture, in the southern Tōhoku region of northern Japan containing an early Jōmon period shell midden. The site was designated a National Historic Site of Japan in 2006 by the Japanese government.

== Overview ==
During the early to middle Jōmon period (approximately 4000 to 2500 BC), sea levels were five to six meters higher than at present, and the ambient temperature was also 2° Celsius higher. During this period, the Tōhoku region was inhabited by the Jōmon people, many of whom lived in coastal settlements. The middens associated with such settlements contain bone, botanical material, mollusc shells, sherds, lithics, and other artifacts and ecofacts associated with the now-vanished inhabitants, and these features, provide a useful source into the diets and habits of Jōmon society. Most of these middens are found along the Pacific coast of Japan.

The location of this shell midden is on a tongue-shaped ocean terrace near the southern border of Minamisōma, approximately 700 meters from the present coastline and at an altitude of approximately 20 meters. The surrounding alluvial area was reclaimed in modern times, and formerly consisted of rice paddies and forest, with a lagoon extending inland almost to the site of the midden. The foundation of a pit dwelling, a group of pillar holes and a grave were also found at the site. The midden itself extends 20 meters from east to west and 40 meters from north to south, and has a maximum depth of 1.8 meters, indicating that the site had been occupied for many centuries.

Four shell layers have been discovered, consisting mostly of Asari clams, but the lower layers also included many fish bones from inshore fish species, and the later layers had bones from oceanic species (such as sharks, tuna and sea bream) indicating that the local inhabitants had the capability of offshore fishing as well as gathering of marine resources from inner bay areas. In addition, there were many animal bones, including that of deer and wild boar and of ducks, which indicates that the inhabitants had a varied diet. Fishing implements made from bone or animal horn were also excavated.

There are no public facilities at the site, which is located approximately by car from Namie Station on the JR East Jōban Line. Plans to create an archaeological park in the area have been delayed by the 2011 Tohoku Earthquake and subsequent Fukushima nuclear disaster.

== See also ==
- List of Historic Sites of Japan (Fukushima)
