= Hayama Cave Tomb =

Kofun period burial site in Minamisōma, Tōhoku, Japan

- 羽山横穴 (Japanese)
- Hayama Cave Tomb Hayama Cave Tomb (Japan)
- 37°36′51.8″N 140°57′26.5″E
- Type: tomb
- Periods: Kofun period
- Location: Minamisōma, Fukushima, Japan
- Region: Tōhoku region

History
- Built: 6th century AD

Site notes
- Elevation: 30 m (98 ft)
- Public access: No

The Hayama Cave Tomb (羽山横穴, Hayama Yokoana) is a yokoanabo (横穴墓), a tunnel tomb in an artificial cave, that is one of twenty such caves in an archaeological site in the Haramachi area of the city of Minamisōma, in Fukushima Prefecture in the southern Tōhoku region of northern Japan. It has been protected by the central government as a National Historic Site since December 23, 1974.

== Overview ==
The tomb cluster is located on a hillside north of the Ota River, and were discovered by chance during the construction of a modern housing district in 1973. The Hayama Cave Tomb has a length of 8.3 meters, with a three-meter vestibule, in a rectangular layout, with a 3 by 2.8 meter opening. On the far wall, the tomb is decorated with designs in red iron oxide, depicting people, a horse, a sawtooth-like geometric design, red deer and spirals connected by red and white lines. The back wall and ceiling are also decorated with more than 250 red and white spots. The presence of these decorations makes the tomb the northernmost decorated kofun discovered so far. Relics found within the tomb include bronze and gilt sword fittings, knives, glass and bronze beads, horse fittings and Sue ware pottery. From these grave goods it is estimated that the tomb dates from sometime in the 6th century AD.

The tomb was formerly open to the public four times per year; however, it has been closed since the 2011 Great Tohoku Earthquake. Full-scale replicas and excavated artifacts are on display at the Minamisōma City Museum. The site is approximately 45 minutes on foot from Haranomachi Station on the JR East Joban Line.

== See also ==
- List of Historic Sites of Japan (Fukushima)
