= Daihisan Stone Buddhas =

Group of Japanese Buddha statues

- 大悲山の石仏 (Japanese)
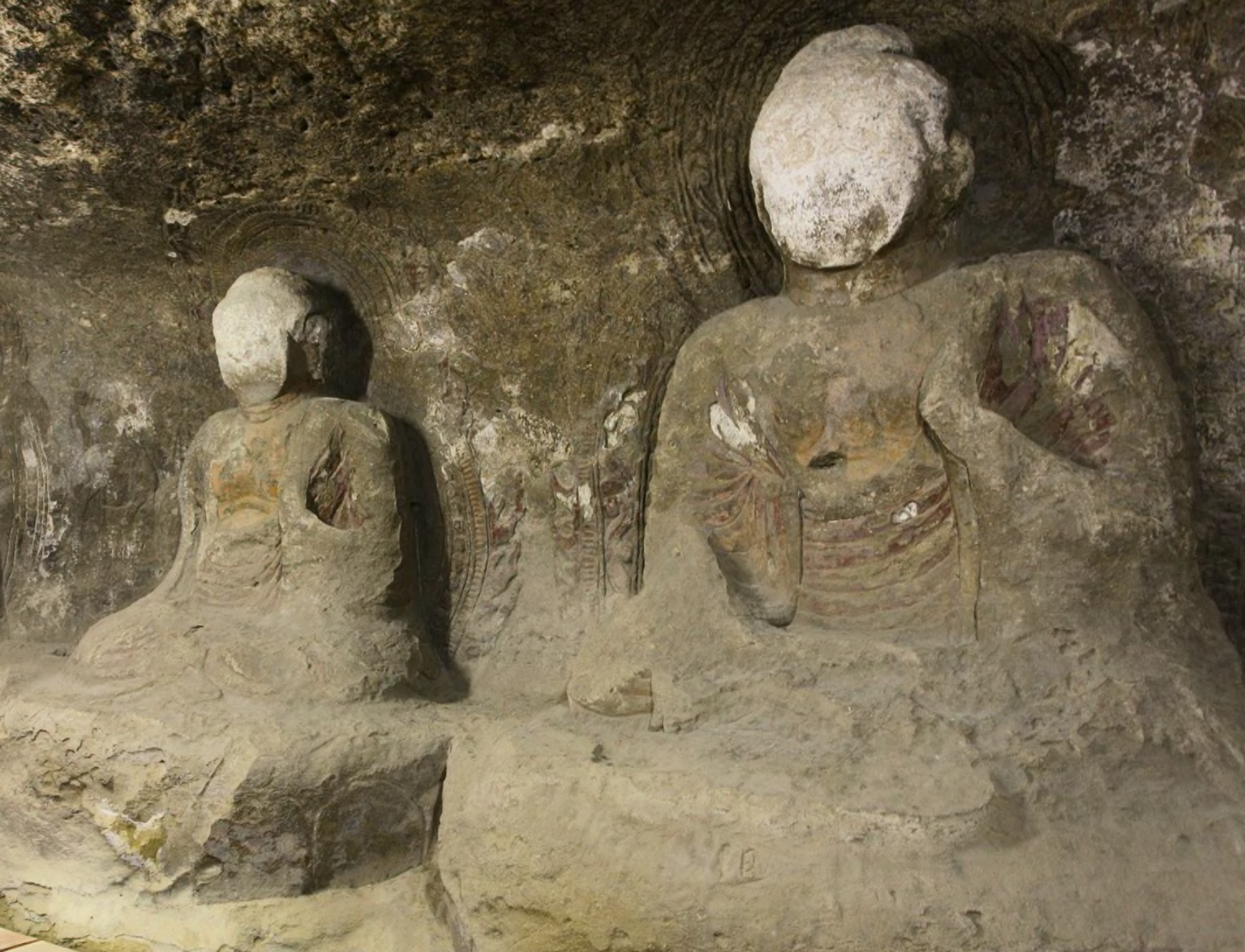

- Daihisan Stone Buddhas Daihisan Stone Buddhas (Japan)
- 37°32′33″N 140°58′58″E
- Periods: Heian period
- Location: Minamisōma, Fukushima Prefecture, Japan
- Region: Tōhoku region

Site notes
- Public access: Yes

The Daihisan Stone Buddhas (大悲山の石仏, Daihisan no sekibutsu) are a group of large religious statues carved in bas-relief into a tuff cliff in Odaka neighborhood of the city of Minamisōma, Fukushima Prefecture in the Tōhoku region of Japan. The site was designated a National Historic Site of Japan in 1930.

== Overview ==
The statues are in three groups. These statues are believed to have been carved during the early Heian period, but do not appear in any surviving documentary records, and their history is unknown. In terms of size and time period, they correspond to the Usuki Stone Buddhas in Kyushu but are in much poorer preservation.

- The Yakushi-dō Stone Buddha (薬師堂石仏) has a height of 5.5 meters and a width of 15 meters, and consists of four seated images of Yakushi Nyōrai and other Buddhas, flanked by two bodhisattva. The carving is the best preserved of the group, and is protected by a chapel. Some traces of yellow and vermilion pigment remains, indicating that this statue was once colorfully painted; however, the face of the main image is largely obliterated.
- The Kannon-dō Stone Buddha (観音堂石仏) is centered on a seated image of Senju Kannon with a height of nine meters, surrounded by many smaller images. It is located slightly to the northeast of the Yakushidō Stone Buddha. It was exposed to the elements and is poorly preserved, but in style it is similar to a statue of Kannon found at Kiyomizu-dera in Kyoto. The chapel protecting the carving was destroyed by the 2011 Tōhoku earthquake, but has since been repaired.
- The Amida-dō Stone Buddha (阿弥陀堂石仏) is located approximately 100 meters to the north of the Yakushi-dō Stone Buddha, but is so badly worn that it is unrecognizable. The outer layers of the carving have completely peeled off, leaving only the core of the image. It is named as a statue of Amida Nyōrai by tradition.

The site is located approximately 20 minutes on foot from Momouchi Station on the JR East Jōban Line.

== See also ==
- List of Historic Sites of Japan (Fukushima)
