= Momouchi Station =

Railway station in Minamisōma, Fukushima Prefecture, Japan

Momouchi Station 桃内駅
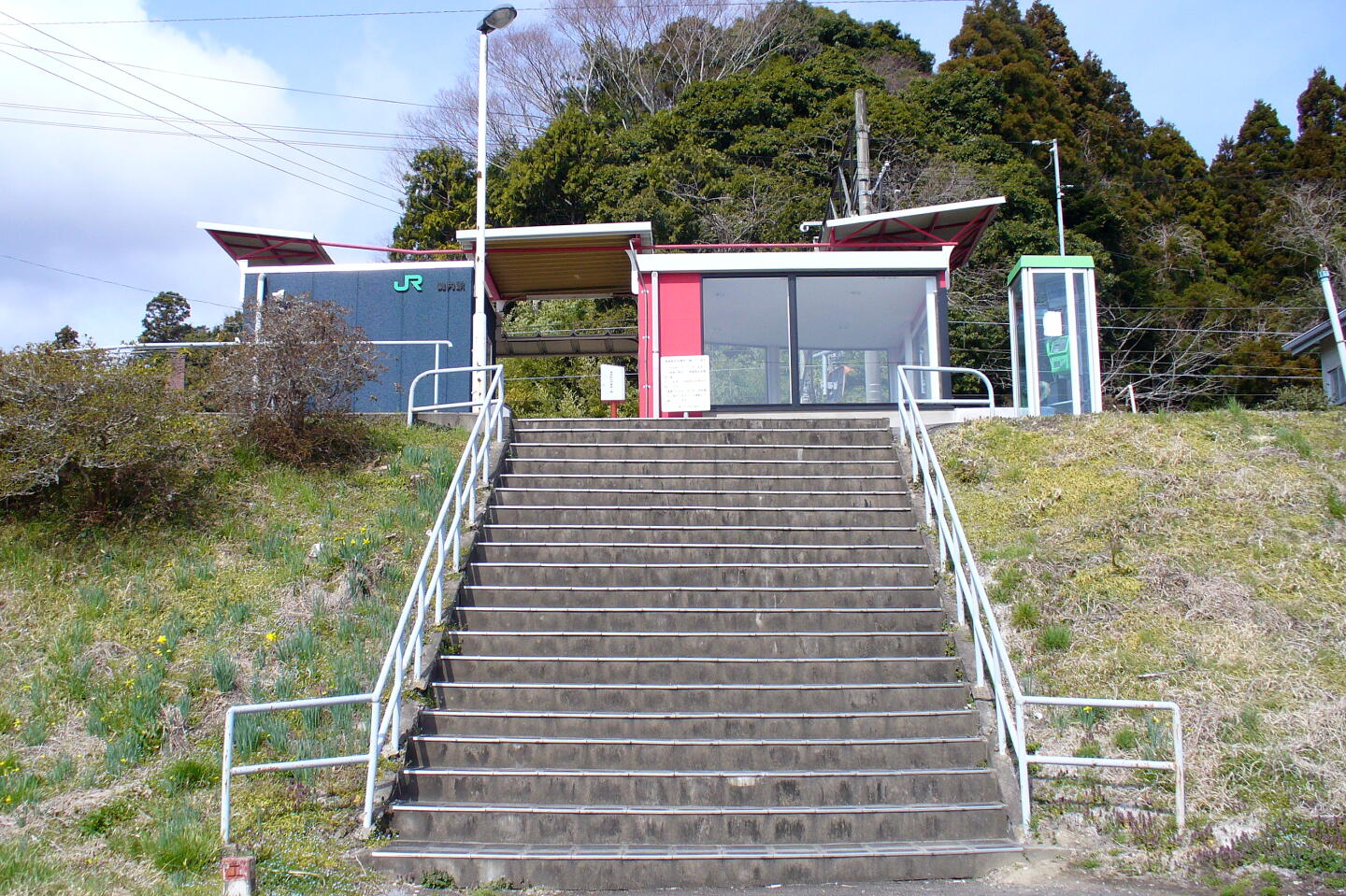
- Momouchi Station in March 2008

General information
- Location: Odaka-ku, Mimidani Momouchi 2, Minamisōma-shi, Fukushima-ken 979-2151; Japan
- Coordinates: 37.5285°N 140.9842°E
- Operator: JR East
- Line: ■ Jōban Line
- Distance: 273.5 km from Nippori
- Platforms: 2 side platforms
- Tracks: 2

Other information
- Status: Unstaffed
- Website: www.jreast.co.jp/estation/station/info.aspx?StationCd=1564

History
- Opened: 10 August 1948

Passengers
- 2004: 41 daily

Services
Preceding station	JR East	Following station
Namie towards Shinagawa	Jōban Line Local-Futsuu	Odaka towards Sendai
Location
- Location within Fukushima Prefecture Location within Japan

Momouchi Station (桃内駅, Momouchi-eki) is a railway station in the city of Minamisōma, Fukushima, Japan, operated by the East Japan Railway Company (JR East).

== Lines ==
Momouchi Station is served by the Jōban Line, and is located 273.5 km from the official starting point of the line at Nippori.

It's the only station of Jōban Line where Suica, as well as other IC cards in Japan, can't be used to pay fares.

=== Station layout ===
The station has a side platform and one island platform connected to the station building by a footbridge. The station is unstaffed.

=== Platforms ===
1	■ Jōban Line	for Namie
2	■ Jōban Line	for Haranomachi and Sendai
3	■ Jōban Line	(not in use)

== History ==
Momouchi Station was opened on 10 August 1948. The station was absorbed into the JR East network upon the privatization of the Japanese National Railways (JNR) on 1 April 1987. The station was closed on 11 March 2011 following the Fukushima Daiichi nuclear disaster, and reopened on 1 April 2017.

== Surrounding area ==
- former Odata Town Hall
- Odaka Post Office
- National Route 6

== See also ==
- List of railway stations in Japan
