= Yokodaidō Steel Production Site =

- 横大道製鉄遺跡 (Japanese)
- Yokodaidō Steel Production Site Yokodaidō Steel Production Site (Japan)
- 37°33′16″N 140°56′44″E
- Periods: Nara to Heian period
- Location: Minamisōma, Fukushima, Japan
- Region: Tōhoku region

Site notes
- Area: 9,301.26 m^{2} (100,117.9 sq ft)
- Public access: Yes (no facilities)

The Yokodaidō Steel Production Site (横大道製鉄遺跡, Yokodaidō seitetsu iseki) is an archaeological site in the city of Minamisōma, Fukushima Prefecture, in the southern Tōhoku region of northern Japan containing the ruins of a large-scale a late-Nara period to early Heian period bloomery (ironworks). The site was designated a National Historic Site of Japan in 2011 by the Japanese government.

== Overview ==
The site is located on a 40-50 meter hilltop about 7 km distant from the Pacific coastline, and extends almost along a long, narrow tongue-shaped hill 240 meters north-south by 60 meters east-west. Excavations from 2007 to 2009 confirmed the ruins of seven iron smelting furnaces, and 26 charcoal-making kilns along with the remains of 31 additional depressions in the nearby woods also believed to have been smelting furnaces together with another 23 possible charcoal kilns. In addition, at the adjacent Tategoshi Steel Production Site are the remains of an additional three iron smelting furnaces and 16 charcoal kilns. The smelting furnaces are designed as a bloomery, with a chimney made of heat-resistant earth and clay, located in a 1.5 meter deep pit and surrounded by an annular (doughnut-shaped) ridge 20 meters in diameter. Up to six bloomeries were located within one annular ring, which pieced with tuyeres to allow air to enter the furnace and molten pig iron to be extracted. The furnaces and slag dump are at the northern end of the ridge, and charcoal kilns were found at the center and southern areas.

In addition, from the first half of the 9th century, a rectangular box-shaped furnace with a length of about 180 cm and a width of about 50 cm, which had a bellows in the center was found. This produced high purity iron, of which several large lumps were also found. Four slag sites have been identified, and over 68 tons of slag have been excavated.

The coastal area of Fukushima Prefecture is rich in iron sand, and the ancient Uda and Namata counties were active areas for steelmaking. Near this archeological site, a late 7th century iron-production ruin has been found in the Kanazawa area near the coast. In the latter half of the 8th century to mid-9th century, production moved inland to the Yokodaidō site, and disappeared in the first half of the 10th century. It is one of the largest steelworks in the Tōhoku region in terms of scale, and is an important archeological site for understanding the political and social situation at the time. During this period, the conflict between the Yamato state and the Emishi tribes of northern Japan was growing and the demand for mass production of iron products such as weapons was rapidly increasing.

The site is about a 31-minute walk from Odaka Station on the JR East Jōban Line.

== See also ==
- List of Historic Sites of Japan (Fukushima)
