= Sakurai Kofun =

- 桜井古墳 (Japanese)
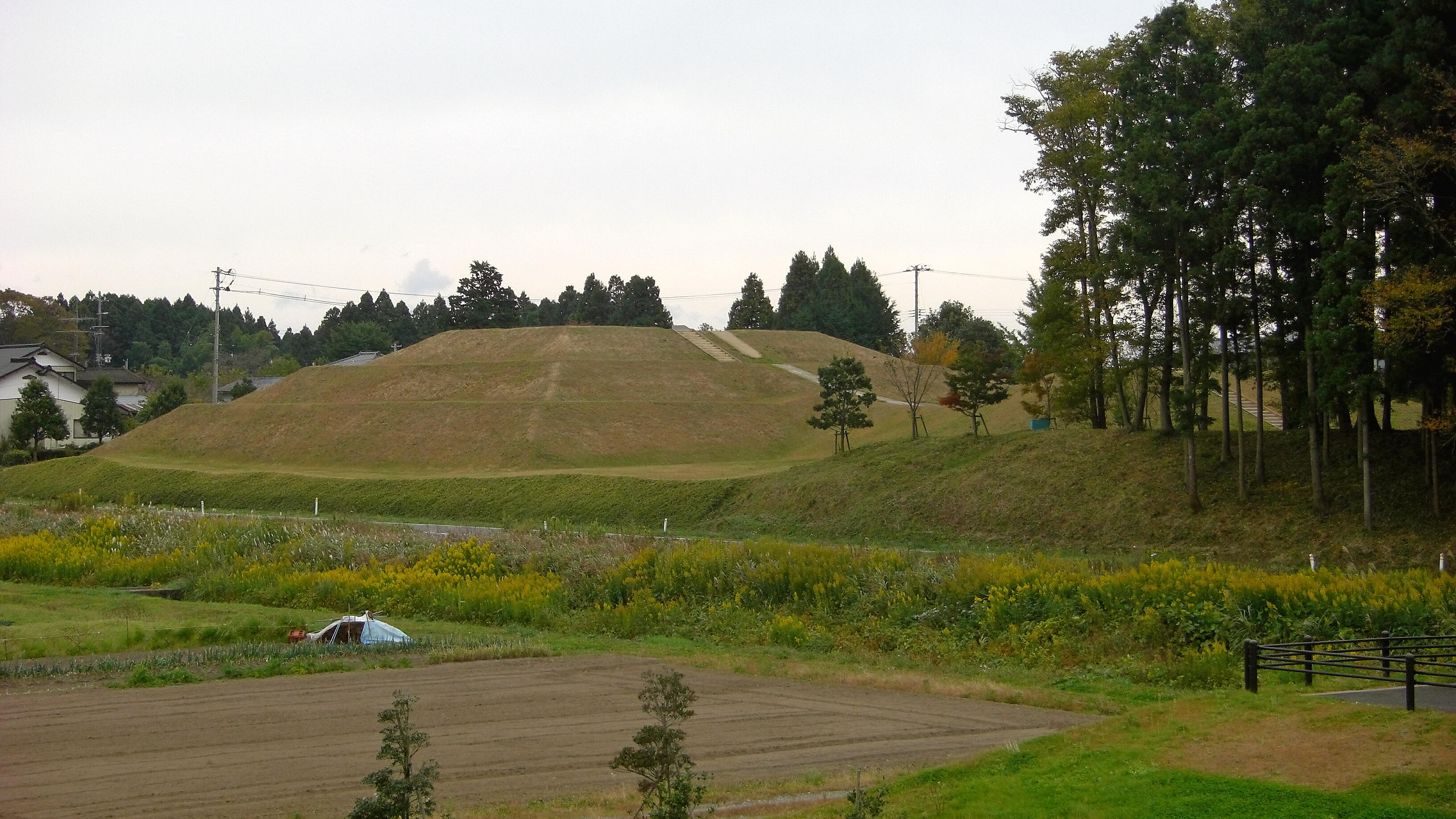
- Sakurai Kofun

- Sakurai Kofun Sakurai Kofun (Japan)
- 37°38′29″N 140°59′29″E
- Type: kofun
- Location: Minamisōma, Fukushima, Japan
- Region: Tōhoku region

History
- Built: mid-4th century AD

Site notes
- Elevation: 30 m (98 ft)
- Area: 22,179 m^{2} (238,730 sq ft)
- Excavation dates: 1955, 1983
- Public access: Yes (Archaeological Park)

The Sakurai Kofun (桜井古墳, Sakurai kofun) is the largest of a group of kofun burial mounds located in what is now the city of Minamisōma, in Fukushima Prefecture in the southern Tōhoku region of northern Japan. It has been protected by the central government as a National Historic Site since 1956. with the extent of the designation expanded in 1988.

== Overview ==
The tumulus is a "two conjoined rectangles" type kofun (zenpō-kōhō-fun (前方後方墳)) located on a low plateau approximately 10 meters in elevation above the southern bank of the Nitagawa River. It is part of a cluster of 37 tumuli, both large and small, spread over a 900 meter section of the same river terrace, of which twelve survive. The kofun drew much attention when first excavated by a team from Meiji University in 1955 as it was the largest kofun then known in the Tōkohu region. Subsequently, larger kofun have been found, but the Sakurai Kofun remains the third largest of its type in the region, with a length of 74.5 meters and height of 6.8 meters. . The head of the tumulus is in the form of an earthen step pyramid 45 meters on each side, with a height of 6.35 meters. From the design and artifacts recovered, it is estimated to have been built in the middle of the 4th century.

During excavations by the Haramachi Board of Education in 1983, traces of a surrounding moat with width of 7 to 20 meters wide and depth of 60 to 70 cm. The area including the moat was added to the designated Historic Site designation in June 1988. It was also found that the southern end of the rear portion of the mound had been truncated in antiquity, so that its original length was once longer than 74.5 meters. No haniwa or fukiishi were discovered; however, fragments of two bamboo-shaped wooden sarcophagus were found at the top of the rear portion of the tumulus.

At present, the kofun is maintained as part of Sakurai Kofun Park, and is located approximately 10 minutes by car from Haranomachi Station on the JR East Joban Line.

== See also ==
- List of Historic Sites of Japan (Fukushima)
