= Mano Kofun Cluster =

- 真野古墳群 (Japanese)
- Mano Kofun Cluster Mano Kofun Cluster (Japan)
- 37°41′49.7″N 140°57′7.2″E
- Type: kofun cluster
- Location: Minamisōma, Fukushima, Japan
- Region: Tōhoku region

Site notes
- Elevation: 30 m (98 ft)
- Excavation dates: 1947
- Public access: Yes (no facilities)

The Mano Kofun Cluster (真野古墳群, Mano Kofun-gun) is a group of a approximately one hundred kofun burial mounds located on river terraces on the south coast of the city of Minamisōma, in Fukushima Prefecture in the southern Tōhoku region of Japan. Some 27 of the tombs have been excavated. The site has been protected by the central government as a National Historic Site since October 24, 1979.

== Overview ==
The Mano Kofun cluster extends over an area measuring three kilometers east-west by one kilometer north-south on the south shore of the Manogawa River, and were formerly grouped into the Hachimori Kofun cluster, Ōtani Kofun cluster and Koikebara Kofun cluster, but were made into a single grouping for the purposes of securing National Historic Site status. Full-scale excavations have been conducted since 1947, and a total of 27 units have been surveyed. Two of the larger tumuli have keyhole-shaped extensions to the top and bottom, and the largest has a moat and a length of 28.5 meters. Most of the others are small empun (円墳)-style circular tumuli with diameter of about 10 meters. The internal structures of the excavated tombs exhibited a great variety, including flagstones, a box-type sarcophagus, and a pit-type stone burial chamber. The grave goods included many straight swords, horse harnesses, and jade jewelry, and stone facsimiles of everyday objects such as axes, and sickles, belonging to the late Kofun period, or the 5th to 6th centuries AD. A number of the horse fittings were of bronze and gold imported from the Asian continent. As these objects were a monopoly of the imperial court during this period, these items indicate the burial of a powerful persons with a strong connection to the Yamato state.

The site is approximately a 20-minute walk from Kashima Station on the JR East Jōban Line.

== See also ==
- List of Historic Sites of Japan (Fukushima)
