= Japanese ship Kashima =

Kashima is the name used by three Japanese ships:

- Japanese battleship Kashima, a Katori-class pre-dreadnought battleship operated by the Imperial Japanese Navy from 1906 to 1924
- Japanese cruiser Kashima, a Katori-class light cruiser operated by the Imperial Japanese Navy from 1940 until 1947
- JDS Kashima (TV-3508), a training vessel operated by the Japan Maritime Self-Defense Force from 1995 to present

== See also ==
- Kashima (disambiguation)
