= Iwaki-Ōta Station =

Railway station in Minamisōma, Fukushima Prefecture, Japan

Coordinates: 37.6051°N 140.9916°E

Iwaki-Ōta Station 磐城太田駅
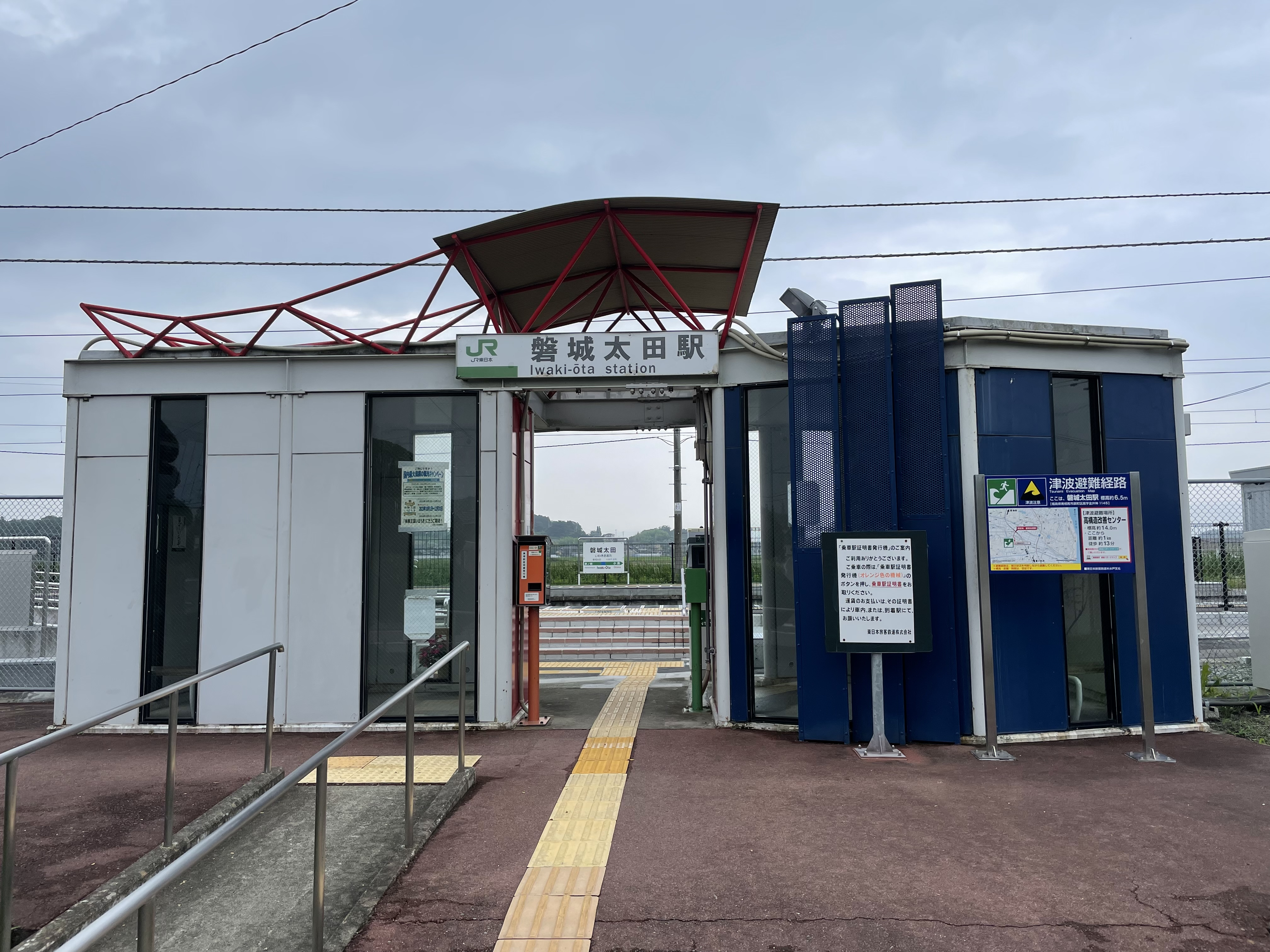
- Iwaki-Ōta Station in July 2022

General information
- Location: 1145 Kaneishin, Taka, Haramachi-ku, Minamisōma-shi, Fukushima-ken 975-0054; Japan
- Operator: JR East
- Line: ■ Jōban Line
- Distance: 282.4 km from Nippori
- Platforms: 2 side platforms
- Tracks: 2

Other information
- Status: Unstaffed
- Website: www.jreast.co.jp/estation/station/info.aspx?StationCd=170

History
- Opened: 11 May 1898
- Former names: Taka (until December 1898)

Services
Preceding station	JR East	Following station
Odaka towards Shinagawa	Jōban Line Local-Futsuu	Haranomachi towards Sendai
Location
- Location within Fukushima Prefecture Location within Japan

Iwaki-Ōta Station (磐城太田駅, Iwaki-Ōta-eki) is a railway station in the city of Minamisōma, Fukushima, Japan, operated by East Japan Railway Company (JR East).

== Lines ==
Iwaki-Ōta Station is served by the Jōban Line, and is located 282.4 km from the official starting point of the line at Nippori in Tokyo.

== Station layout ==
The station has two opposed side platforms connected to the station building by a footbridge. The station is unattended.

=== Platforms ===
1	■ Jōban Line	for Haranomachi and Sendai
2	■ Jōban Line	for Namie

== History ==
The station opened on 11 May 1898 as Taka Station (高駅) and was renamed Iwaki-Ota on 1 December 1898. It became part of the JR East network following the privatization of the Japanese National Railways (JNR) on 1 April 1987. The station was closed on 11 March 2011 following the Fukushima Daiichi nuclear disaster. It reopened on 12 July 2016, with the reopening of the section of the Joban Line between Odaka and Haranomachi.

== See also ==
- List of railway stations in Japan
