= Minamisōma =

Minamisōma 南相馬市
- City
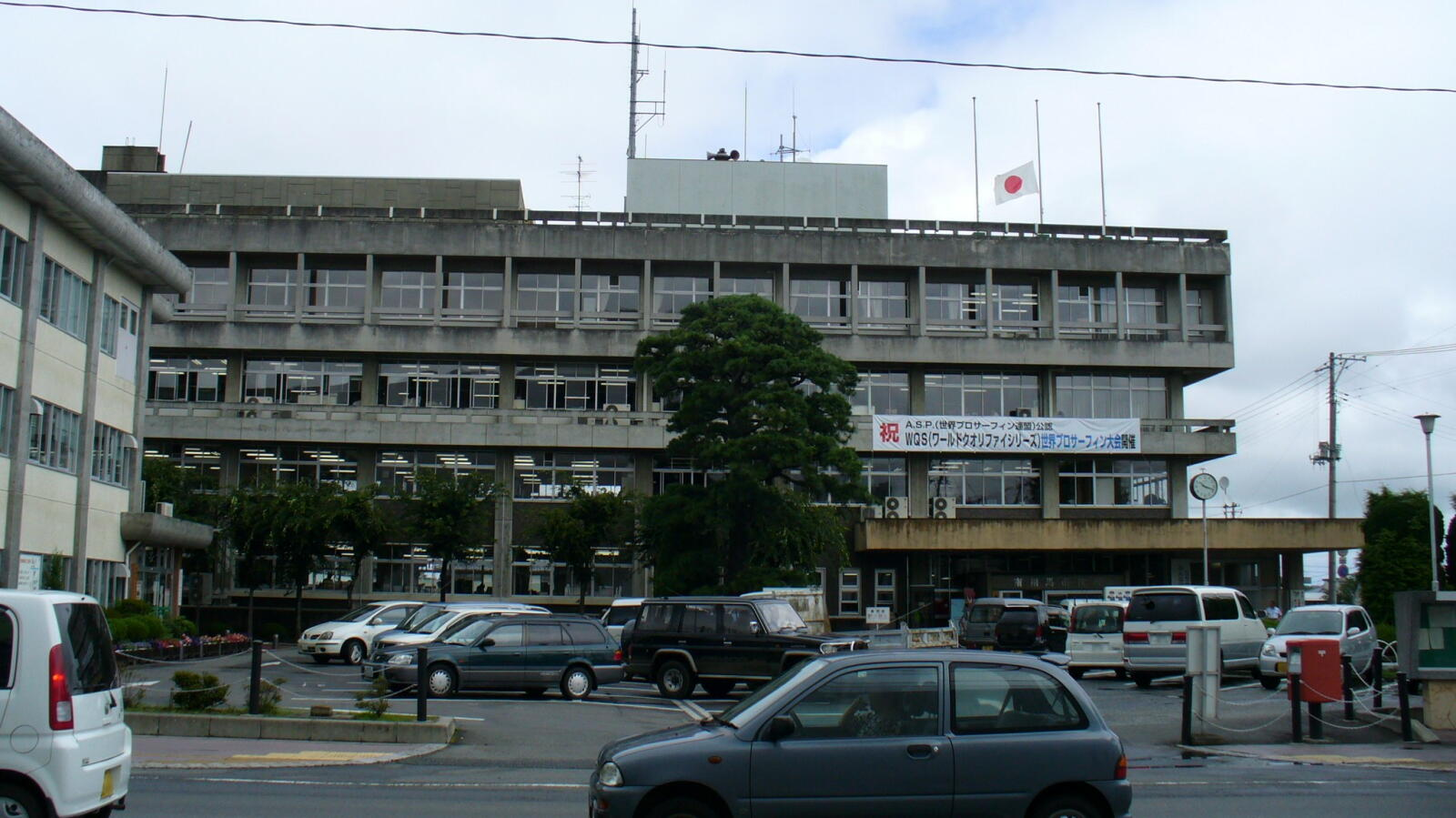
- Minamisōma City Hall

- Flag Emblem

- Location of Minamisōmain Fukushima Prefecture

- Coordinates: 37°38′31.9″N 140°57′26.3″E
- Country: Japan
- Region: Tōhoku
- Prefecture: Fukushima

Government
  - Mayor: Katsunobu Sakurai

Area
  - Total: 398.58 km^{2} (153.89 sq mi)

Population (October 10, 2020)
  - Total: 59,005
  - Density: 148.04/km^{2} (383.42/sq mi)
- Time zone: UTC+9 (Japan Standard Time)
- Tree: Japanese Zelkova
- Flower: Sakura
- Bird: Skylark
- Fish: Salmon
- Insect: Firefly
- Address: 2-27 Motomachi, Haramachi-ku, Minamisōma-shi, Fukushima-ken 975-8686
- Website: Official website

Minamisōma (南相馬市, Minamisōma-shi) is a city located in Fukushima Prefecture, Japan. As of 1 March 2020, the city had an estimated population of 53,462 in 26,355 households, and a population density of 130 persons per km^{2}. The total area of the city is 398.58 square kilometres (153.89 sq mi).

== Geography ==
Minamisōma is located in northeastern Fukushima Prefecture, bordered by the Pacific Ocean to the east and the Abukuma Plateau to the west.

=== Neighboring municipalities ===
- Fukushima Prefecture
  - Iitate
  - Namie
  - Sōma

== Climate ==
Minamisōma has a humid climate (Köppen climate classification Cfa). The average annual temperature in Minamisōma is 12.4 °C. The average annual rainfall is 1285 mm with September as the wettest month. The temperatures are highest on average in August, at around 24.7 °C, and lowest in January, at around 1.7 °C.

== Demographics ==
Per Japanese census data, the population of Minamisōma peaked in the 1950s.

Historical population
Year	Pop.	±%
1920	51,903	—
1930	58,470	+12.7%
1940	60,693	+3.8%
1950	80,004	+31.8%
1960	75,299	−5.9%
1970	69,105	−8.2%
1980	74,296	+7.5%
1990	77,253	+4.0%
2000	75,246	−2.6%
2010	70,878	−5.8%
2020	59,005	−16.8%

== History ==
The area of present-day Minamisōma was part of ancient Mutsu Province, and has been settled since at least the Jōmon period. Numerous Kofun period remains have been found in the area. During the Edo period, the area was part of the holdings of Sōma Domain. After the Meiji Restoration, it was organized as part of Iwaki Province. With the establishment of the modern municipalities system on April 1, 1896, the area was organized into a number of towns and villages within Sōma District, including the town of Hara on September 1, 1897. Hara was raised to city status on March 20, 1954, becoming the city of Haramachi. The present city of Minamisōma was established on January 1, 2006, from the merger of Haramachi with the towns of Kashima and Odaka (both from Sōma District).

=== 2011 earthquake and tsunami ===
Minamisōma was partially inundated by the tsunami which resulted from the Tōhoku earthquake on March 11, 2011, and suffered heavy damage. As of April 9, 2011, 400 residents were confirmed dead, with 1,100 missing.

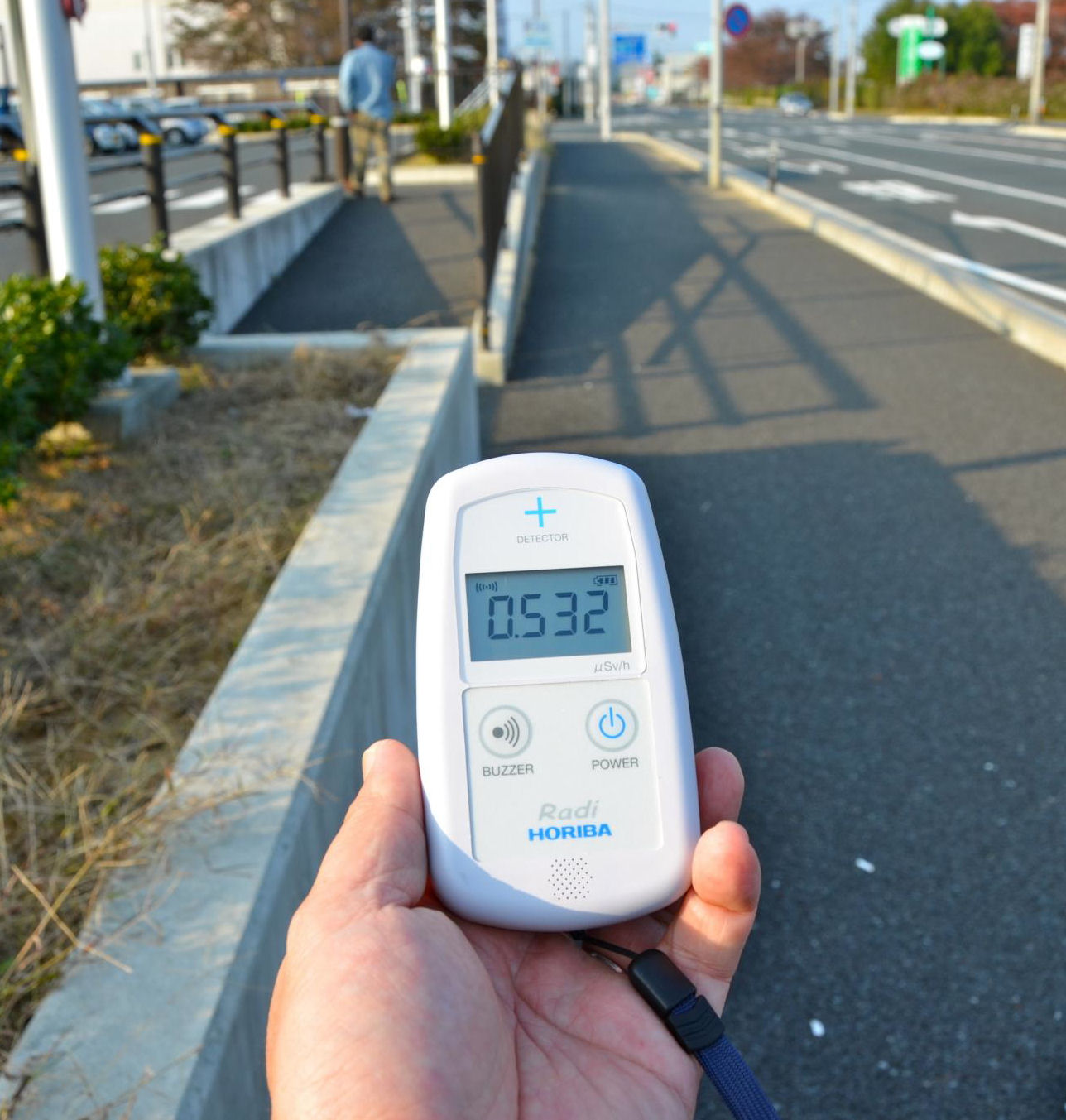
Radiation monitor showing radiation at Minamisoma: 0.532 μSv/h. This equates to an annual radiation dose of 4.66 millisieverts, compared to the government's criteria for return of 20 millisieverts per year.

Minamisōma is about 25 kilometres (16 miles) north of Fukushima I Nuclear Power Plant, the site of the nuclear accident that followed the 2011 Tōhoku earthquake and tsunami. Much of the city lies within the 30 kilometer mandated evacuation zone near the plant, and thus most of the residents were forced to leave. Approximately a week after the earthquake Minamisōma was in the news again as the town's mayor Katsunobu Sakarai asserted that his people had been "abandoned" in the wake of orders for all remaining residents to stay in their homes inside the exclusion zone around the Fukushima Daiichi Nuclear Power Plant.

In July, beef from Minamisōma was found to be contaminated with radioactive cesium above the legal limit, according to the Daily Yomiuri.

In March 2012, the city was divided into three zones: in the first, people were free to go in and out but not allowed to stay overnight; in the second, access was limited to short visits; and in the third area, all entry was forbidden because of elevated radiation levels that were not expected to go down within five years after the accident.

On April 15, 2012 some of people of Minamisōma were able to return to their homes when the evacuation zone was reduced from 30 kilometers to 20 kilometers from the reactors, with the exception of a wide area on the western border of the city with the town of Namie. At the time the evacuation order was lifted the centre of city was still scattered with ruins and lacked electricity and running water, while schools and hospitals remained closed. On July 12, 2016 the evacuation order was lifted for all areas of the city except the western border region with Namie; this permitted all of the remaining evacuees (with the exception of one household) to return home. In August of the same year, elementary schools and junior high schools, which had been closed since 2011, were allowed to reopen.

== Government ==
Minamisōma has a mayor-council form of government with a directly elected mayor and a unicameral city legislature of 24 members. Minamisōma, together with Sōma District contributes two members to the Fukushima Prefectural Assembly. In terms of national politics, the city is part of Fukushima 1st district of the lower house of the Diet of Japan.

== Education ==
Minamisōma has 16 public elementary schools and six public junior high schools operated by the city government and four public high schools operated by the Fukushima Prefectural Board of Education.

== Economy ==
Tohoku Electric's Haramachi Thermal Power Station is located in Minamisōma.

== Transportation ==
=== Railway ===
East Japan Railway Company (JR East) - Jōban Line

- Momouchi - Odaka - Iwaki-Ota - Haranomachi - Kashima

=== Highway ===
- Jōban Expressway - Minamisoma Interchange, Minamisoma-Kashima Service Area and Smart Interchange
- National Route 6
- National Route 114

== Sister cities ==
- Pendleton, Oregon, United States

== Local attractions ==
- Ruins of Odaka Castle

=== National Historic Sites ===
- Daihisan Stone Buddhas
- Hayama Cave Tomb
- Izumi Kanga ruins
- Mano Kofun Cluster
- Sakurai Kofun
- Urajiri Shell Mound
- Yokodaidō Steel Production Site
