= Sōma District, Fukushima =

District in Fukushima Prefecture, Japan

Coordinates: 37.714°N 140.784°E

Location of Sōma District in Fukushima Prefecture

Sōma (相馬郡, Sōma-gun) is a district located in Fukushima Prefecture, Japan.

As of 2003, the district has an estimated population of 41,540 and a density of 87.18 persons per km^{2}. The total area is 476.49 km^{2}.

== Towns and villages ==
- Shinchi
- Iitate

== Merger ==
- On January 1, 2006 the city of Haramachi and the towns of Kashima and Odaka merged to create the city of Minamisōma.

== See also ==
- Radiation effects from Fukushima I nuclear accidents
