= Kashima Station (Fukushima) =

Railway station in Minamisōma, Fukushima Prefecture, Japan

Kashima Station 鹿島駅
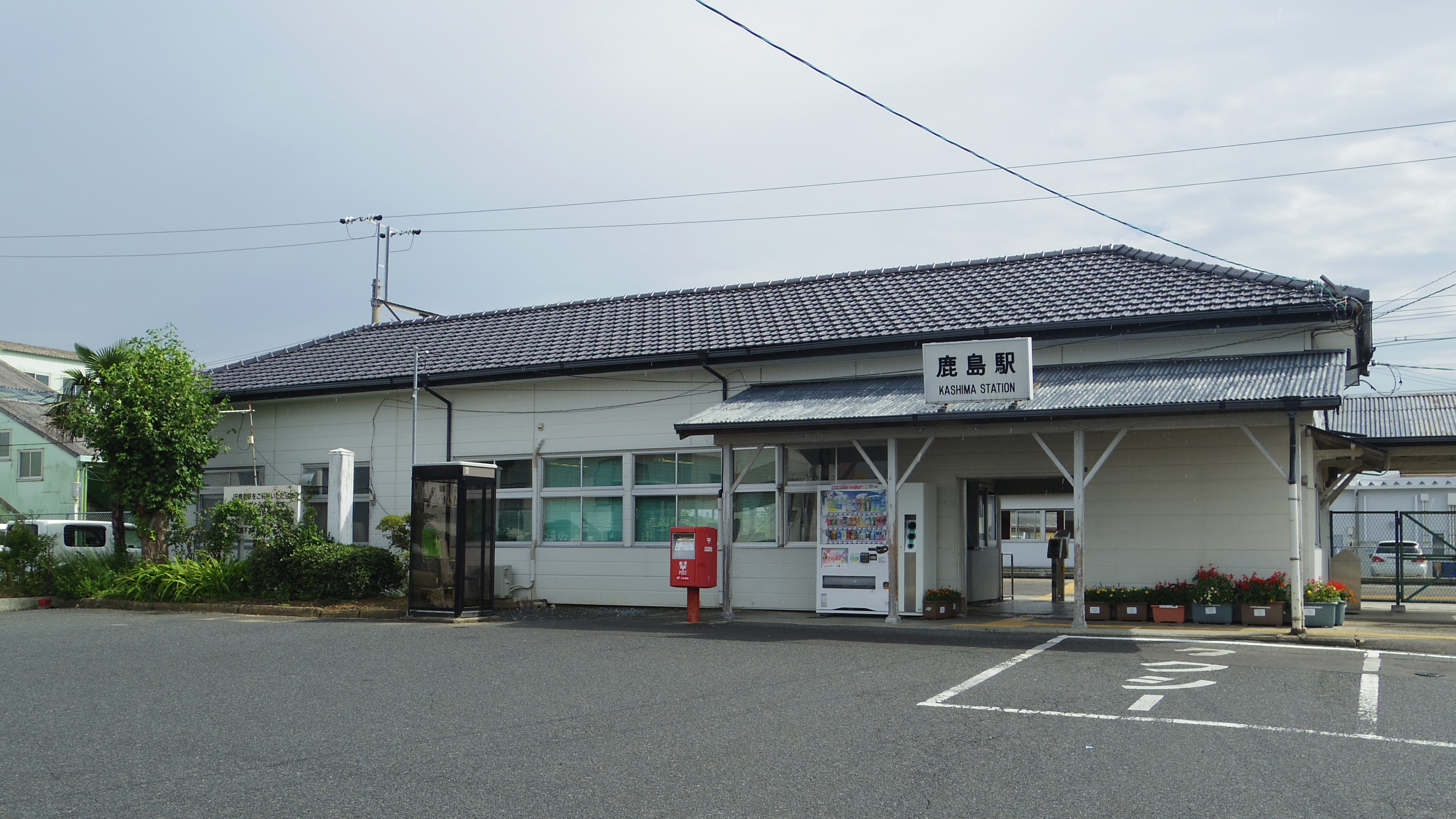
- Kashima Station in August 2014

General information
- Location: Kashima Maenouchi, Kashima-ku, Minamisōma-shi, Fukushima-ken 979-2335; Japan
- Coordinates: 37.7030°N 140.9703°E
- Operator: JR East
- Line: ■ Jōban Line
- Distance: 294.4 km from Nippori
- Platforms: 2 side platforms
- Tracks: 2

Other information
- Status: Unstaffed
- Website: www.jreast.co.jp/estation/station/info.aspx?StationCd=429

History
- Opened: 3 April 1898

Passengers
- FY2015: 318

Services
Preceding station	JR East	Following station
Haranomachi towards Shinagawa	Jōban Line Local-Futsuu	Nittaki towards Sendai
Location
- Location within Fukushima Prefecture Location within Japan

Kashima Station (鹿島駅, Kashima-eki) is a railway station in the city of Minamisōma, Fukushima, Japan, operated by the East Japan Railway Company (JR East).

== Lines ==
Kashima Station is served by the Joban Line, and is located 294.4 km from the official starting point of the line at Nippori in Tokyo.

== Station layout ==
The station has two opposed side platforms connected to the station building by a footbridge. The station is unattended.

=== Platforms ===
1	■ Joban Line	for Haranomachi
2	■ Joban Line	for Sōma

== History ==
Kashima Station opened on 3 April 1898. With the privatization of JNR on 1 April 1987, the station came under the operational control of JR East. Due to damage to the line caused by the 2011 Tōhoku earthquake and tsunami, trains from Kashima were able to travel as far as Sōma Station to the north and Haranomachi Station to the south. Services south towards Odaka station resumed in July 2016. Full services to the north resumed in December 2016. Service was extended to Namie resumed on 1 April 2017. Services between Namie and Tatsuta remain suspended until at least the year 2020.

== Passenger statistics ==
In fiscal 2015, the station was used by an average of 318 passengers daily (boarding passengers only).

== Surrounding area ==
- Former Kashima Town Hall
- Kashima Post Office

== See also ==
- List of railway stations in Japan
