= Haramachi Thermal Power Station =

Power plant in Fukushima, Japan

Haramachi Thermal Power Station 原町火力発電所
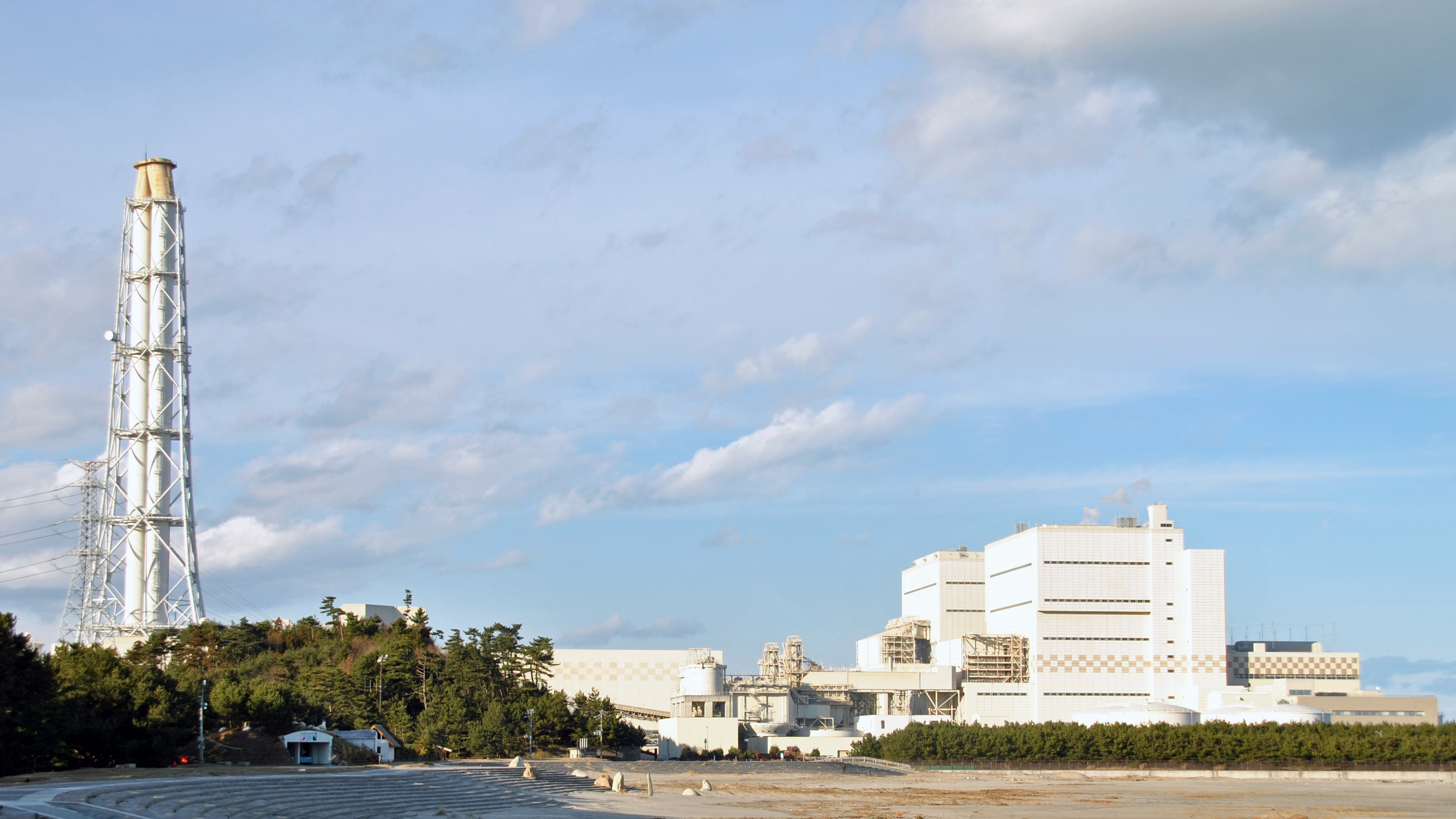
- Haramachi Thermal Power Station
- Country: Japan Fukushima Prefecture#Japan
- Location: Minamisōma, Fukushima, Japan
- Coordinates: 37°39′58″N 141°01′06″E
- Status: Operational
- Commission date: 1997
- Owner: Tohoku Electric
- Operator: Tohoku Electric Power

Thermal power station
- Primary fuel: Coal / Biomass

Power generation
- Units operational: 2
- Nameplate capacity: 2000 MW

External links
- Commons: Related media on Commons

Haramachi Thermal Power Station (原町火力発電所, Haramachi Karyoku Hatsudensho) is a coal-fired thermal power station operated by Tohoku Electric in the city of Minamisōma, Fukushima, Japan. The facility is located on the Pacific coast of Honshu north of the Fukushima Daiichi Nuclear Power Plant.

== History ==
The Haramachi Thermal Power Station was built to provide baseline power to the Tohoku region of Japan, including Fukushima Prefecture. Unit 1 came online in July 1997, followed by Unit 2 in July 1998. Initially, only imported coal was used as fuel; however, due to pressures to reduce with carbon emissions, both units were modified in 2010 to burn a mixture of coal and biomass (wood chip residue).

Unit 1 is Tohoku Electric Power's first 1000 MW thermal power unit, the largest in Japan at the time, and uses a supercritical boiler and steam turbine with a main steam temperature of 566 °C, a reheat steam temperature of 593 °C, and a main steam pressure of 24.5MPa. In Unit 2, the main steam temperature and reheat steam temperature were both raised to 600 °C to further improve efficiency.

In addition, the "Haramachi Solar Power Plant", a 1 MW solar power plant, was built on the site of the power plant and started operation on January 15, 2015.

On March 11, 2011, the Tohoku-Pacific Ocean Earthquake caused massive damage from the direct hit of a tsunami of 18 meters in height. One employee died during the evacuation and a fire due to oil leak occurred. All four coal carriers were damaged and an 80,000-ton class coal ship was sunk. The power plant is located in the emergency evacuation zone area of the Fukushima Nuclear Disaster which greatly hampered recovery work. However, Unit 2 was restarted on November 3, 2012 and Unit 1 on January 28, 2013. On March 29, 2013, Unit 2 resumed commercial operation, and on April 26, 2013, Unit 1 resumed commercial operation.

== Plant details ==
| Unit | Fuel | Type | Capacity | On line | Status |
| 1 | Coal / Biomass | Ultra Super Critical Steam Turbine | 1000 MW | 1997 | operational |
| 2 | Coal / Biomass | Ultra Super Critical Steam Turbine | 1000 MW | 1998 | operational |

== See also ==
- Energy in Japan
- List of power stations in Japan
