= Tomioka Station =

Railway station in Tomioka, Fukushima Prefecture, Japan

Tomioka Station 富岡駅
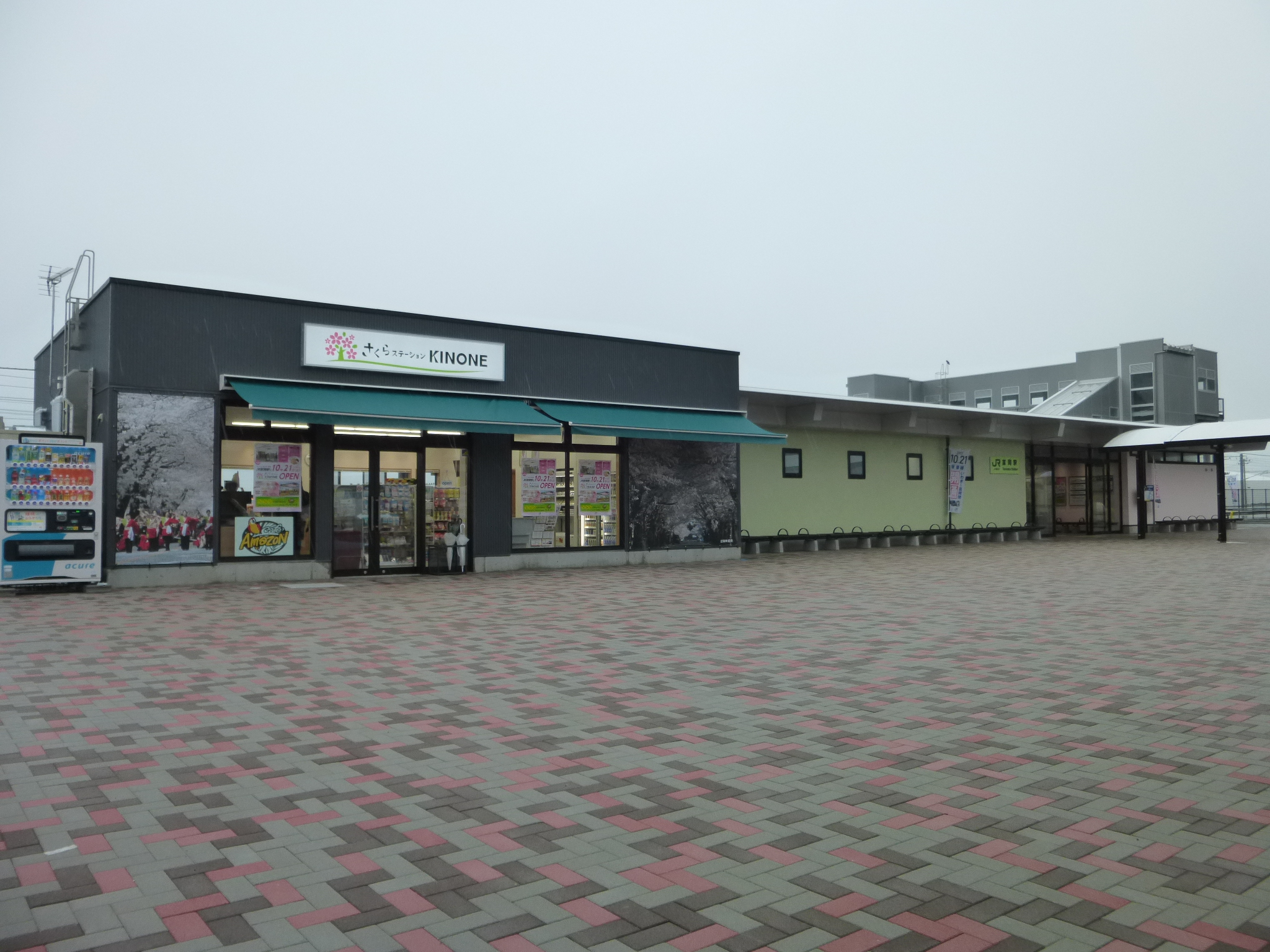
- The rebuilt station in October 21, 2017

General information
- Location: 24 Kamata, Hotokehama, Tomioka-machi, Futaba-gun, Fukushima-ken; Japan
- Coordinates: 37.3337°N 141.0224°E
- Operator: JR East
- Line: ■ Jōban Line
- Platforms: 1 side + 1 island platform
- Tracks: 3

Other information
- Status: Unstaffed
- Website: Official website

History
- Opened: 23 August 1898; 128 years ago
- Rebuilt: 2011–2017

Passengers
- 2018: 225 daily

Services
Preceding station	JR East	Following station
Hirono towards Shinagawa	Hitachi	Ōno towards Sendai
Tatsuta towards Shinagawa	Jōban Line Local-Futsuu	Yonomori towards Sendai
Location
- Location within Fukushima Prefecture Location within Japan

Tomioka Station (富岡駅, Tomioka-eki) is a railway station in the town of Tomioka, Fukushima, Japan, operated by the East Japan Railway Company (JR East). Built in 1898, the station was destroyed by a tsunami in March 2011, and reopened six years later in October 2017.

== Lines ==
Tomioka Station is served by the Jōban Line, located 247.8 km (154.0 mi) from the official starting point of the line at Nippori Station.

== Station layout ==
Tomioka Station has one island platform and one side platform, connected by a footbridge. The station building had a staffed ticket office until March 13, 2020. After relocating to the new station building on October 21, 2017, the Midori no Madoguchi was not set up. It has been unstaffed station from March 14, 2021.

=== Platforms ===
1	■ Jōban Line	for Namie, Haranomachi, Sōma and Sendai
2	■ Jōban Line	for Hirono, Iwaki, Takahagi, Hitachi, Katsuta, Mito, Tomobe and Tsuchiura
3	■ Jōban Line	for Iwaki and Mito

== History ==
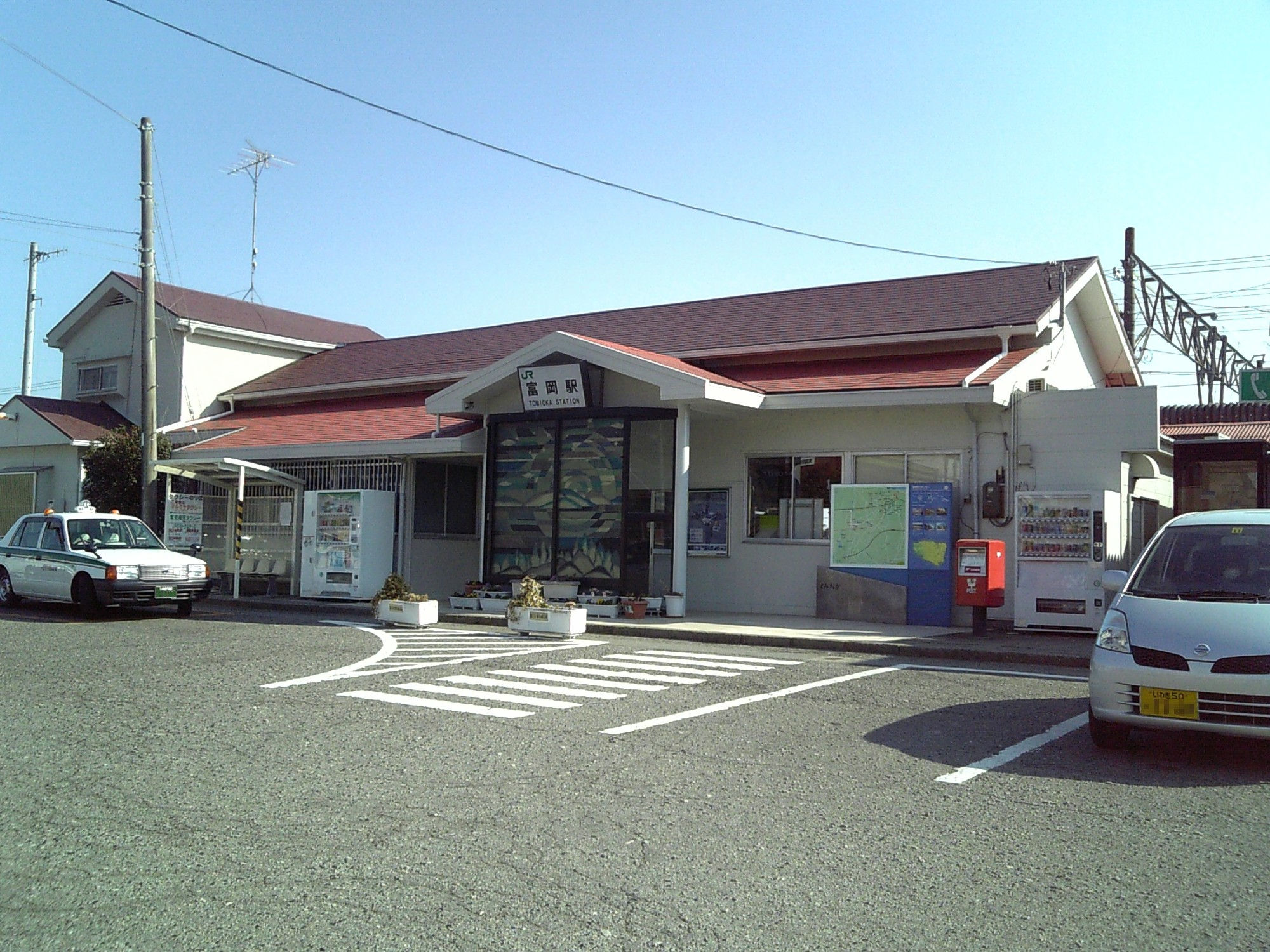
Tomioka Station as it appeared in March 2009

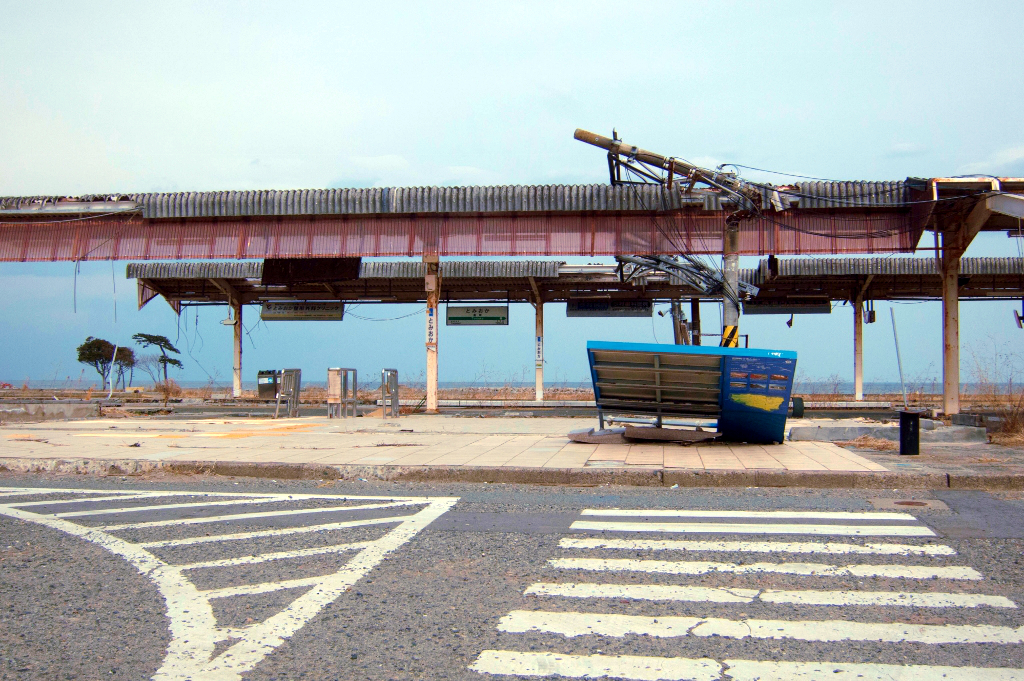
The station in March 2012 viewed from approximately the same place as the top image after the tsunami disaster

Tomioka Station opened on 23 August 1898. With the privatization of Japanese National Railways (JNR) on 1 April 1987, the station came under the control of JR East.

The station was destroyed by the tsunami from the 11 March 2011 Tōhoku earthquake. In January 2015, work started on dismantling the remains of the station building and footbridge. On 14 September 2017, a train arrived at the station for the first time in over six years. On 21 October 2017, rail services resumed between Tatsuta station and Tomioka station.

== Passenger statistics ==
In fiscal 2018, the station was used by an average of 225 passengers daily (boarding passengers only). The passenger figures for previous years are as shown below.

Fiscal year	Daily average
2000	649
2005	564
2010	474
2015	0 (Services suspended)

== Surrounding area ==
Tomioka was within the evacuation zone surrounding the Fukushima Daiichi Nuclear Power Plant. Residents were not allowed to stay overnight in the area for six years time after the incident due to the high radiation levels in the period.

- Tomioka Town Hall
- Tomioka Post Office
- Tomioka Fishing Port
- National Route 6

== See also ==
- List of railway stations in Japan
