= Odaka, Fukushima =

Dissolved municipality in Fukushima prefecture, Japan

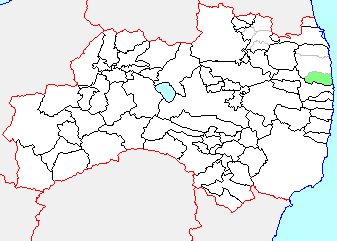
Map of Odaka, Fukushima

Odaka (小高町, Odaka-machi) was a town located in Sōma District, Fukushima, Japan.

== Population ==
As of 2003, the town had an estimated population of 13,482 and a density of 146.62 persons per km^{2}. The total area was 91.95 km^{2}.

== Merge ==
On January 1, 2006, Odaka, along with the city of Haramachi, and the town of Kashima (also from Sōma District), was merged to create the city of Minamisōma.

== 2011 Tsunami ==
In 2011, Odaka, along with other towns in the Fukushima area, experienced the effects of a nuclear meltdown. Three reactors melted in Fukushima after an undersea earthquake sent a very destructive tsunami crashing into the coastline.
