= Kashima, Fukushima =

Dissolved municipality in Fukushima prefecture, Japan

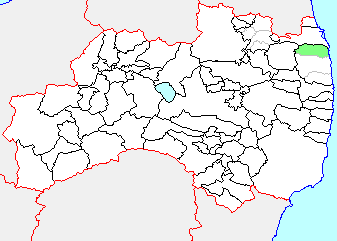
Map of Kashima, Fukushima

Kashima (鹿島町, Kashima-machi) was a town located in Sōma District, Fukushima Prefecture, Japan.

As of 2003, the town had an estimated population of 12,341 and a density of 114.21 persons per km^{2}. The total area was 108.06 km^{2}.

On January 1, 2006, Kashima, along with the city of Haramachi, and the town of Odaka (also from Sōma District), was merged to create the city of Minamisōma.

== Points of interest ==
- Michinoku Mano-Manyo Botanical Garden
