= Soma Station =

Railway station in Soma, Fukushima Prefecture, Japan

Soma Station 相馬駅
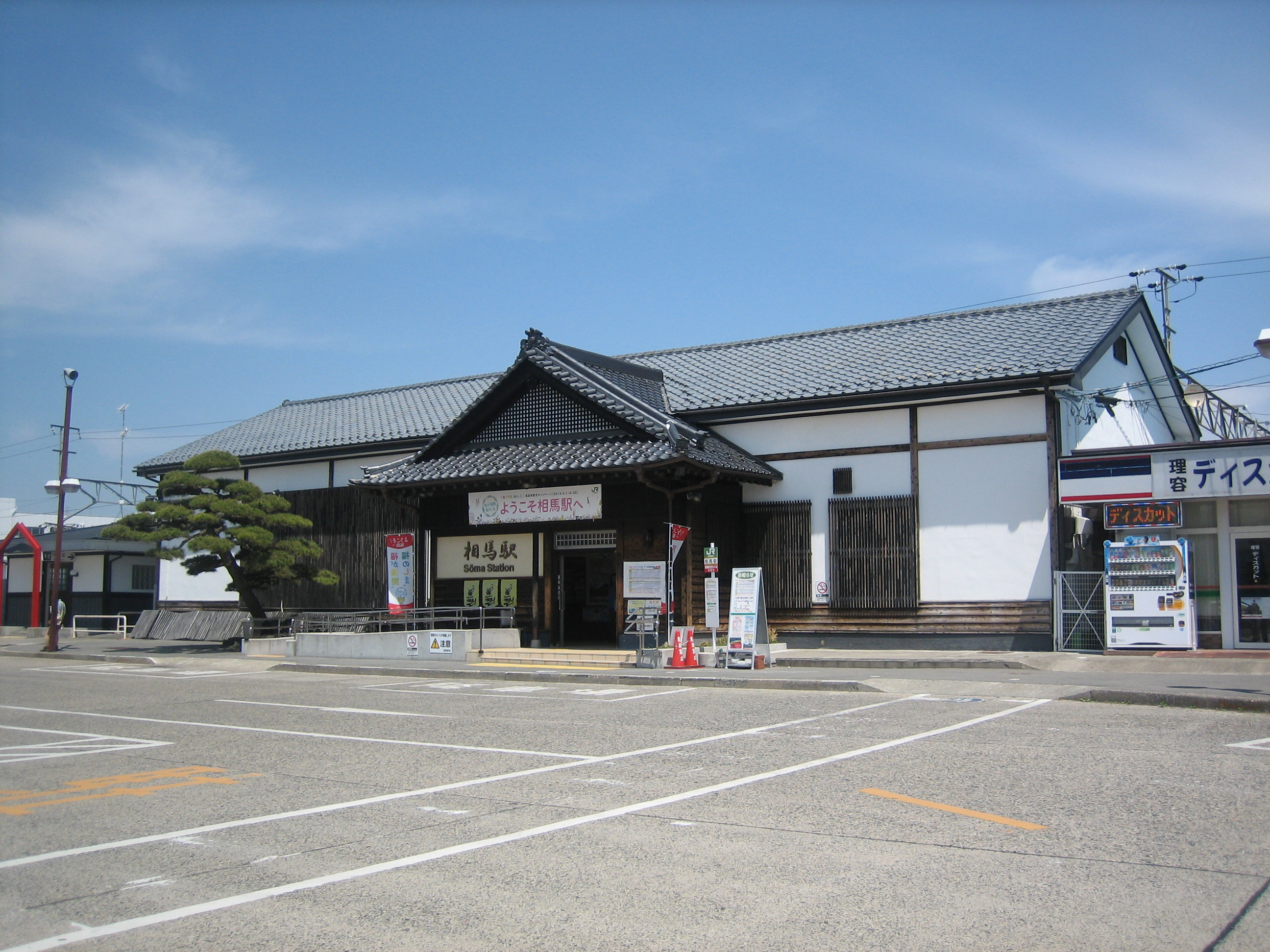
- Soma Station in May 2014

General information
- Location: Nakamura, Soma-shi, Fukushima-ken 976-0042; Japan
- Coordinates: 37.8026°N 140.9254°E
- Operator: JR East
- Line: ■ Jōban Line
- Distance: 307.0 km from Nippori
- Platforms: 2 side platforms
- Tracks: 2

Other information
- Status: Staffed
- Website: www.jreast.co.jp/estation/station/info.aspx?StationCd=919

History
- Opened: 10 November 1897; 128 years ago
- Former names: Nakamura (until 1961)

Passengers
- FY2020: 841 daily

Services
Preceding station	JR East	Following station
Haranomachi towards Shinagawa	Hitachi	Watari towards Sendai
Nittaki towards Shinagawa	Jōban Line Local-Futsuu	Komagamine towards Sendai
Location
- Location within Fukushima Prefecture Location within Japan

Soma Station (相馬駅, Sōma-eki) is a railway station in the city of Soma, Fukushima, Japan, operated by the East Japan Railway Company (JR East).

== Lines ==
Soma Station is served by the Jōban Line, and is located 307.0 km from the official starting point of the line at Nippori in Tokyo.

== Station layout ==
The station has two opposed side platforms connected to the station building by a footbridge. However, at present platform 2 is not in use. Midori-no-madoguchi closed on March 17, 2023.

=== Platforms ===
1	■ Jōban Line	for Iwanuma and Sendai
2	■ Jōban Line	for Haranomachi, Namie, Tomioka, Iwaki, Hitachi, Mito, Ishioka and Tsuchiura

== History ==
The station first opened as Nakamura Station (中村駅) on 10 November 1897. It was renamed Sōma Station on 20 March 1961. The station was closed after the 11 March 2011 Tōhoku earthquake, with services resuming on 21 December only as far as Haranomachi Station. Services were resumed to Hamayoshida Station on 10 December 2016 and full services on 14 March 2020.

== Passenger statistics ==
In fiscal 2018, the station was used by an average of 1144 passengers daily (boarding passengers only).

== Surrounding area ==
- Nakamura Castle ruins
- Sōma City Office
- Sōma Post Office
- Soma General Hospital
- Sōma Jinja
- National Route 6
- National Route 113
- National Route 115

== See also ==
- List of railway stations in Japan
