= Kashima (surname) =

Kashima (written: 鹿島) is a Japanese surname. Notable people with the surname include:

- Hitomi Kashima (born 1980), Japanese swimmer
- Satoshi Kashima, Japanese civil engineer
- Seibei Kashima (1866–1924), Japanese photographer
- Sho Kashima (born 1986), American freestyle skier
- Takehiro Kashima (born 1980), Japanese gymnast

== Fictional characters ==
- Miyuki Kashima, one of the eponymous characters in the manga and anime series Miyuki
- Yukari Kashima, fictional character in Vampire Princess Miyu
- Yū Kashima, fictional character in Monthly Girls' Nozaki-kun
- Kashima Reiko, in the urban legend Teke Teke
- Todd Kashima, a SATO Marine in Call of Duty: Infinite Warfare
