= Haramachi, Fukushima =

Dissolved municipality in Fukushima prefecture, Japan

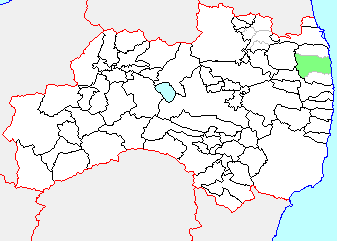
Map of Haramachi, Fukushima

Haramachi (原町市, Haramachi-shi) was a city located in Fukushima Prefecture, Japan.

As of 2003, the city had an estimated population of 48,234 and a density of 243.00 persons per km^{2}. The total area was 198.49 km^{2}.

On January 1, 2006, Haramachi, along with the towns of Kashima and Odaka (both from Sōma District), was merged to create the city of Minamisōma.

The city was founded on March 20, 1954.

The city is about 25 kilometres (16 mi) north of the Fukushima I Nuclear Power Plant, which had major nuclear accidents following the 2011 Tōhoku earthquake and tsunami.
