= Haranomachi Station =

Railway station in Fukushima Prefecture, Japan

Haranomachi Station 原ノ町駅
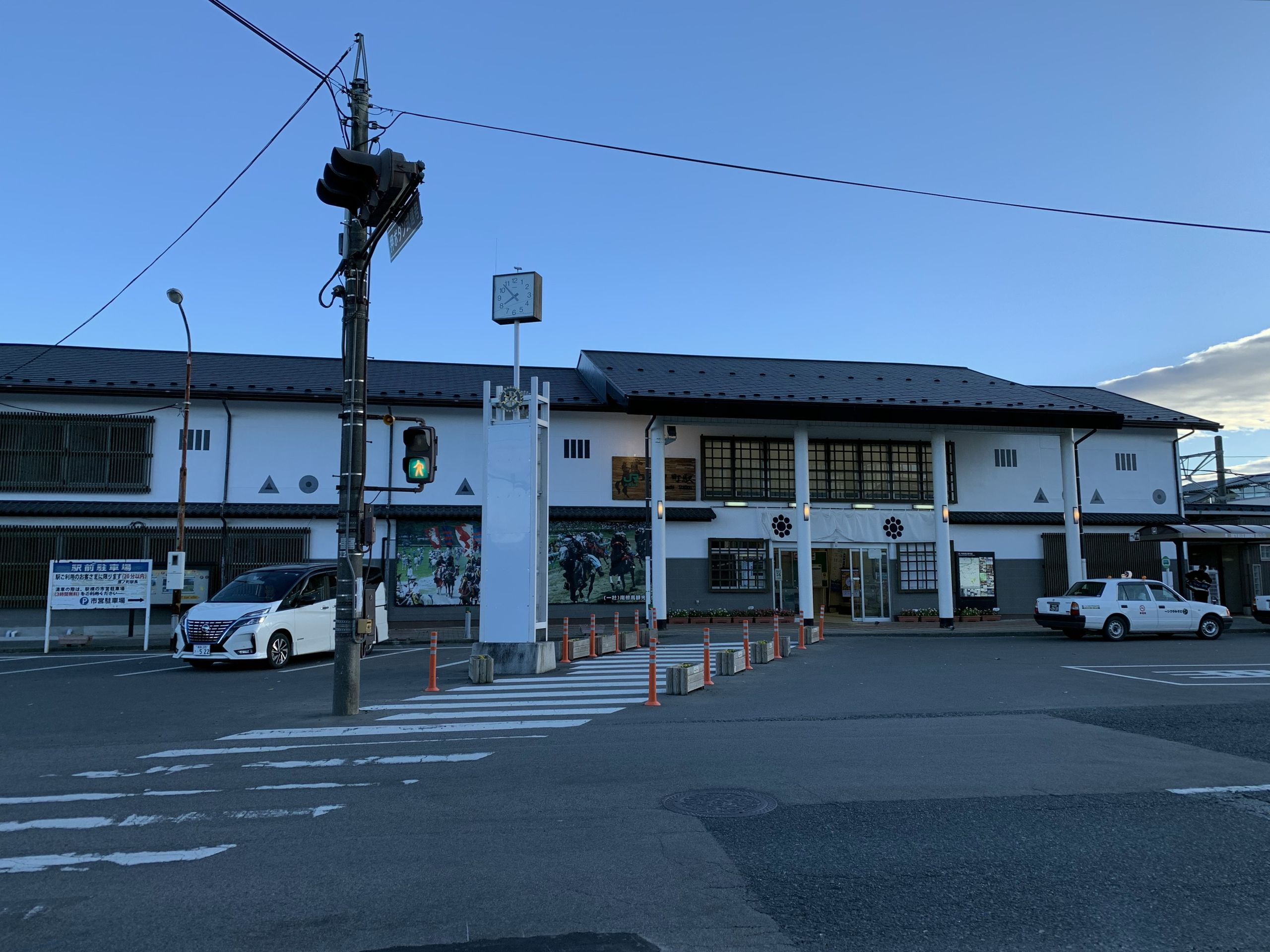
- Haranomachi Station in October 2020

General information
- Location: Asahi-cho 2-27-2, Haramachi-ku, Minamisōma-shi, Fukushima-ken 975-0004; Japan
- Coordinates: 37.6378°N 140.9711°E
- Operator: JR East
- Line: ■ Jōban Line
- Distance: 286.9 km from Nippori
- Platforms: 1 side + 1 island platform
- Tracks: 3

Other information
- Status: Staffed (Midori no Madoguchi)
- Website: www.jreast.co.jp/estation/station/info.aspx?StationCd=1259

History
- Opened: 3 April 1898; 128 years ago

Passengers
- FY2020: 838 daily

Services
Preceding station	JR East	Following station
Namie towards Shinagawa	Hitachi	Soma towards Sendai
Iwaki-Ota towards Shinagawa	Jōban Line Local-Futsuu	Kashima towards Sendai
Location
- Location within Fukushima Prefecture Location within Japan

Haranomachi Station (原ノ町駅, Haranomachi-eki) is a railway station in the city of Minamisōma, Fukushima, Japan, operated by East Japan Railway Company (JR East).

== Lines ==
Haranomachi Station is served by the Joban Line, and is located 286.9 km from the official starting point of the line at Nippori.

== Station layout ==
The station has a side platform and an island platform connected to the station building by a footbridge. The station has a Midori no Madoguchi staffed ticket counter.

=== Platforms ===
1	■ Joban Line	for Iwanuma and Sendai
2	■ Joban Line	for Odaka, Namie, Tomioka, Iwaki, Takahagi, Hitachi and Mito
3	■ Joban Line	for Iwanuma and Sendai

== History ==
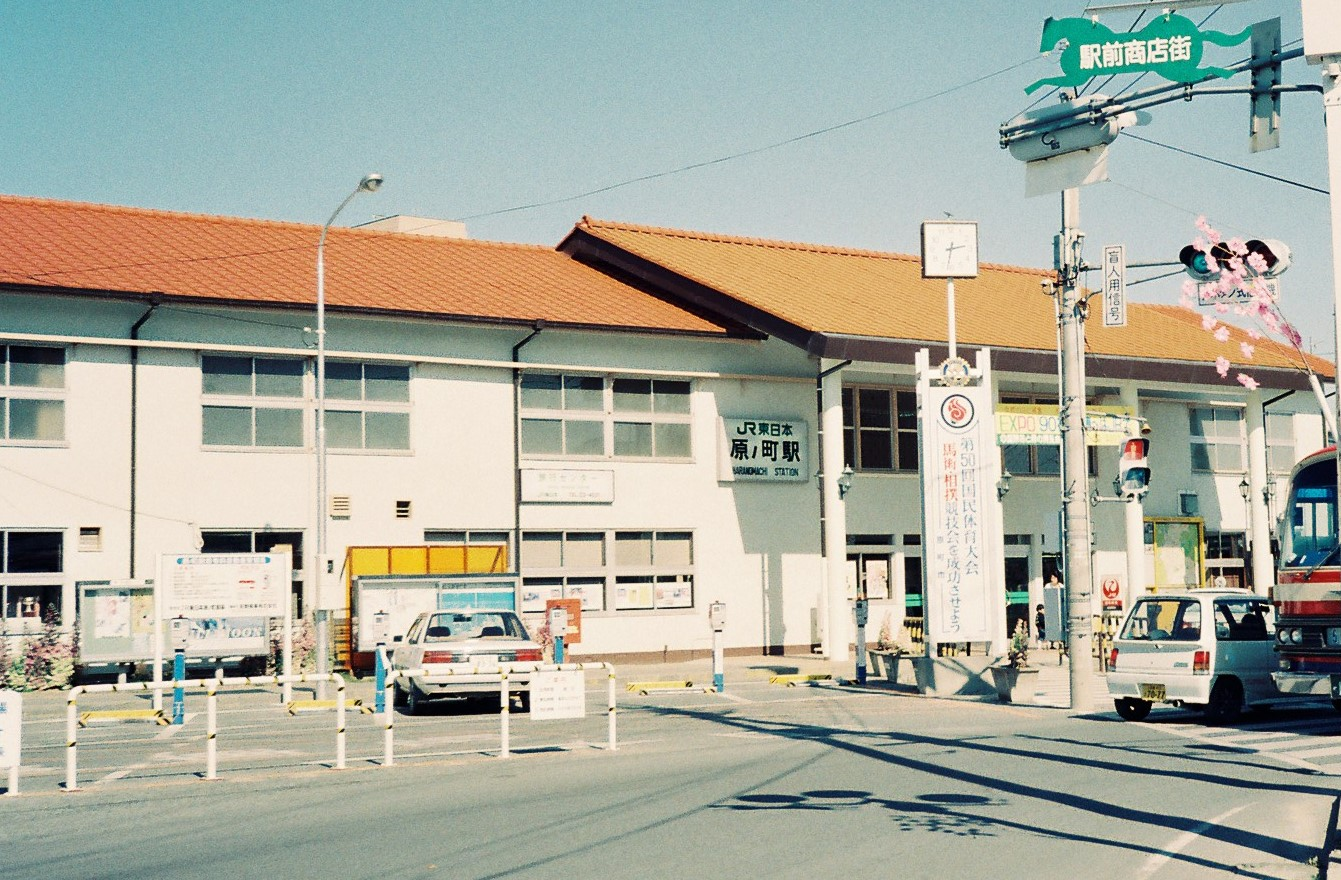
The station building in April 1990

Haranomachi Station opened on 3 April 1898. With the privatization of Japanese National Railways (JNR) on 1 April 1987, the station came under the control of JR East.

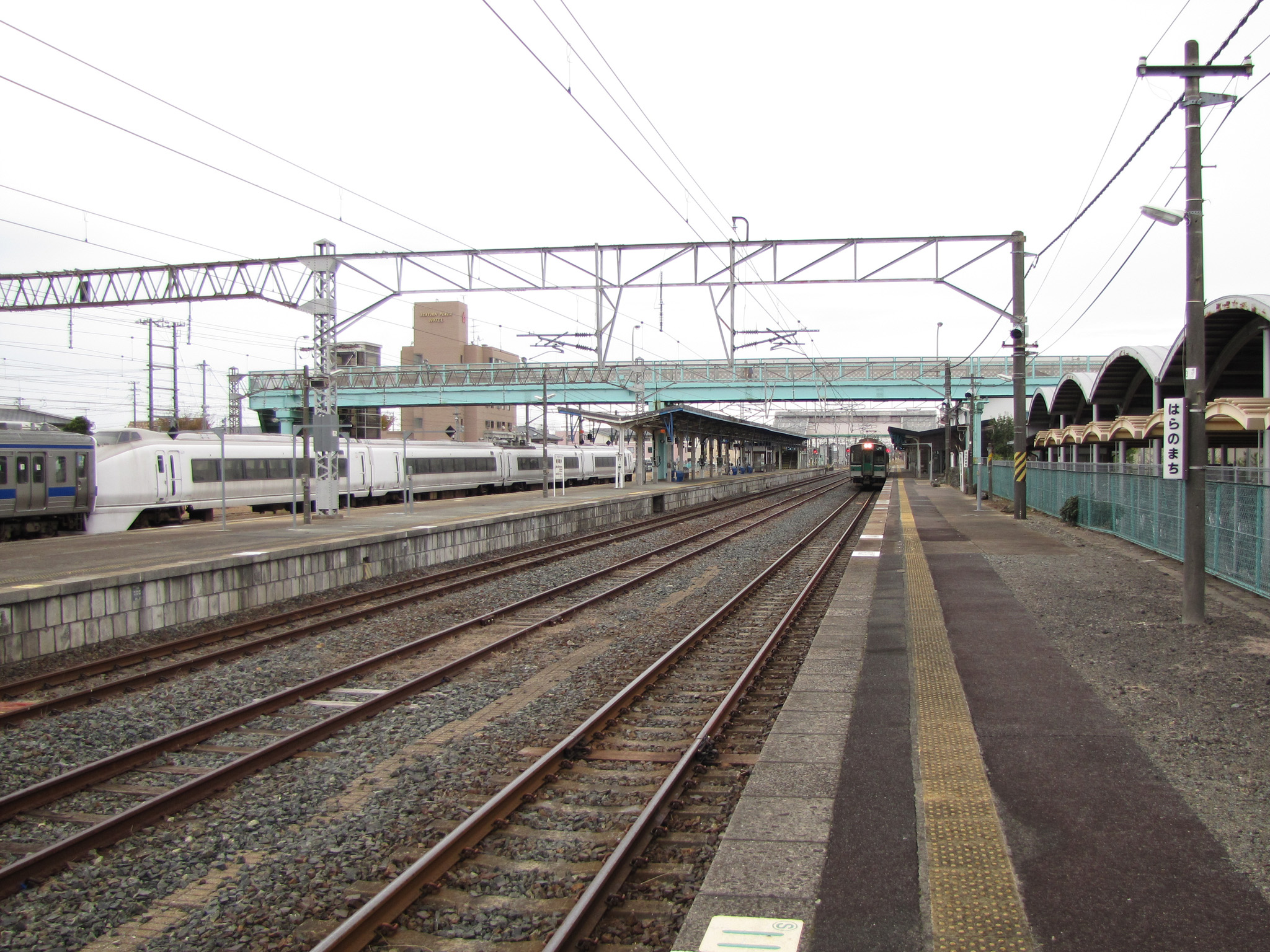
The station in December 2012, with the two stranded trains visible on the left

Train services from the station were suspended following the 2011 Tōhoku earthquake and tsunami on 11 March 2011. From 21 December 2011, limited services were restored on the section of the Joban Line between Haranomachi and Sōma.

In March 2016, the two trains, a four-car 651 series (Super Hitachi) EMU and a 415-1500 series EMU, stranded at the station since the March 2011 tsunami, were removed by road for scrapping.

The section of the Joban Line between Odaka and Haranomachi reopened on 12 July 2016.

== Passenger statistics ==
In fiscal 2018, the station was used by an average of 1024 passengers daily (boarding passengers only). The passenger figures for previous years are as shown below.

Fiscal year	Daily average
2000	2,336
2005	1,991
2010	1,679
2011	—N/a
2012	619
2013	613
2014	593
2015	609

== Surrounding area ==
- former Haramachi City Hall
- Haramachi Post Office
- National Route 6
- Road Station Minamisoma

== See also ==
- List of railway stations in Japan
