= Namie Station =

Railway station in Namie, Fukushima Prefecture, Japan

Namie Station 浪江駅
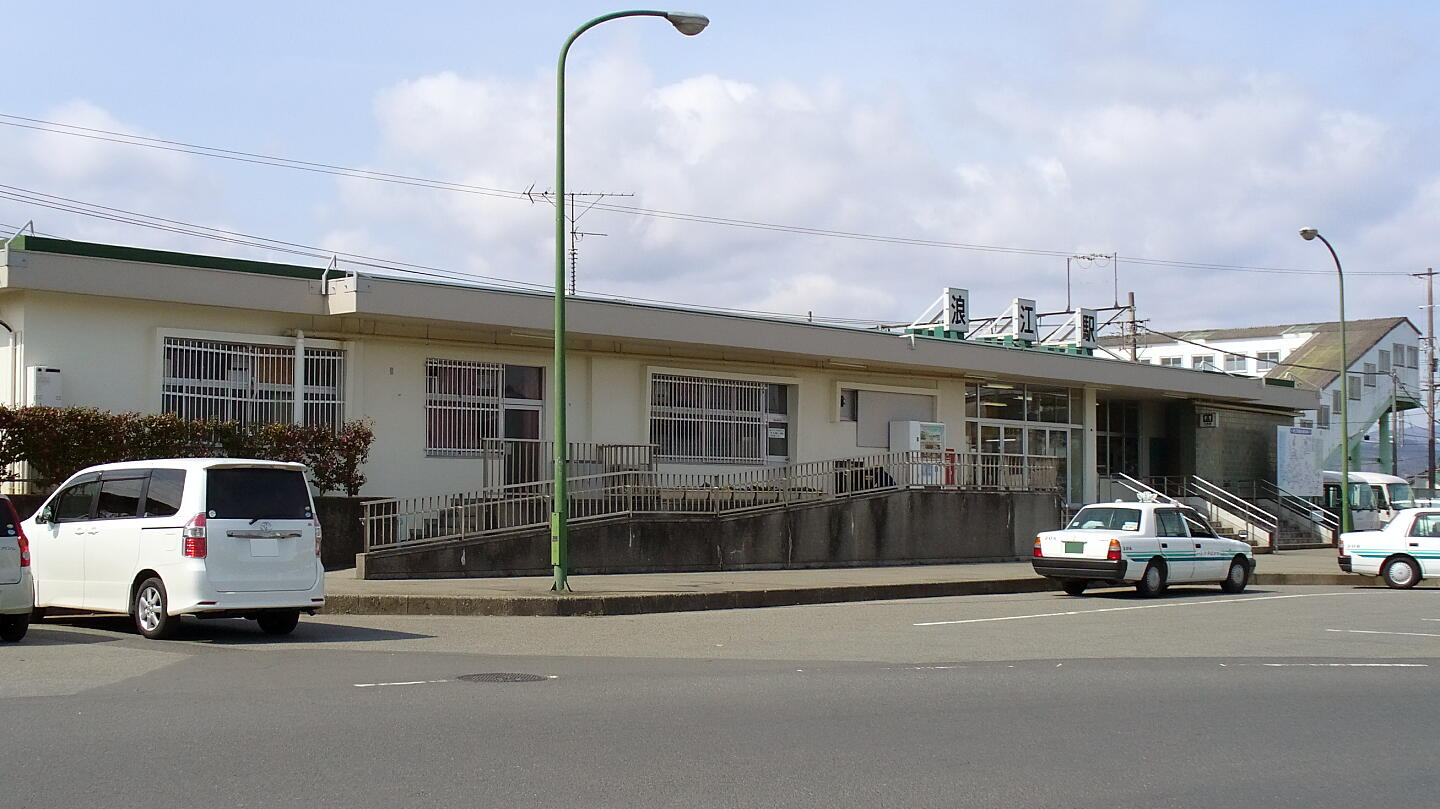
- Namie Station in March 2008

General information
- Location: Gogendo Tsugoe 8, Namie-machi, Futaba-gun, Fukushima-ken 979-1521; Japan
- Coordinates: 37.4921°N 140.9897°E
- Operator: JR East
- Line: ■ Jōban Line
- Distance: 268.6 km from Nippori
- Platforms: 1 side + 1 island platform
- Tracks: 3

Other information
- Status: unstaffed
- Website: Official website

History
- Opened: 23 August 1898; 128 years ago

Passengers
- FY2018: 24 daily

Services
Preceding station	JR East	Following station
Futaba towards Shinagawa	Hitachi	Haranomachi towards Sendai
Futaba towards Shinagawa	Jōban Line Local-Futsuu	Momouchi towards Sendai
Location
- Location within Fukushima Prefecture Location within Japan

Namie Station (浪江駅, Namie-eki) is a railway station in the town of Namie, Fukushima, Japan. Due to the Fukushima Daiichi nuclear disaster, services were suspended from 11 March 2011 to 1 April 2017.

== Lines ==
Namie Station is served by the Jōban Line, and is located 268.6 km from the official starting point of the line at Nippori.

== Station layout ==
Namie Station has a side platform and one island platform connected to the station building by a footbridge. The station is unstaffed.

=== Platforms ===
1	■ Jōban Line	for Tomioka, Iwaki, Isohara, Takahagi, Hitachi, Katsuta, Mito, Ishioka and Tsuchiura
2	■ Jōban Line	for Haranomachi, Soma and Sendai
3	■ Jōban Line	for Haranomachi

== History ==
Namie Station was opened on 23 August 1898. The station was absorbed into the JR East network upon the privatization of the Japanese National Railways (JNR) on 1 April 1987. The station was closed on 11 March 2011 following the Fukushima Daiichi nuclear disaster. Services between Namie and Odaka resumed on 1 April 2017. Services between Namie and Tomioka remain suspended until reopened in March 2020. It became an unstaffed station from March 14, 2020.

== Passenger statistics ==
In fiscal 2018, the station was used by an average of 24 passengers daily (boarding passengers only). The passenger figures for previous years are as shown below.

Fiscal year	Daily average
2000	1,057
2005	904
2010	734
2015	0 (Services suspended)

== Surrounding area ==
- Namie Town Hall
- Namie Post Office
- National Route 6

== See also ==
- List of railway stations in Japan
