= Japan National Route 6 =

National highway in Japan

National Route 6
- 国道6号

Route information
- Length: 353.6 km (219.7 mi)
- Existed: 4 December 1952–present

Major junctions
- South end: National Route 1 / National Route 4 / National Route 15 / National Route 17 / National Route 20 in Nihonbashi, Chūō-ku, Tokyo
- North end: Nigatake Interchange; National Route 4 / National Route 45 / National Route 47 in Miyagino-ku, Sendai

Location
- Country: Japan

Highway system
- National highways of Japan; Expressways of Japan
← National Route 5	→ National Route 7

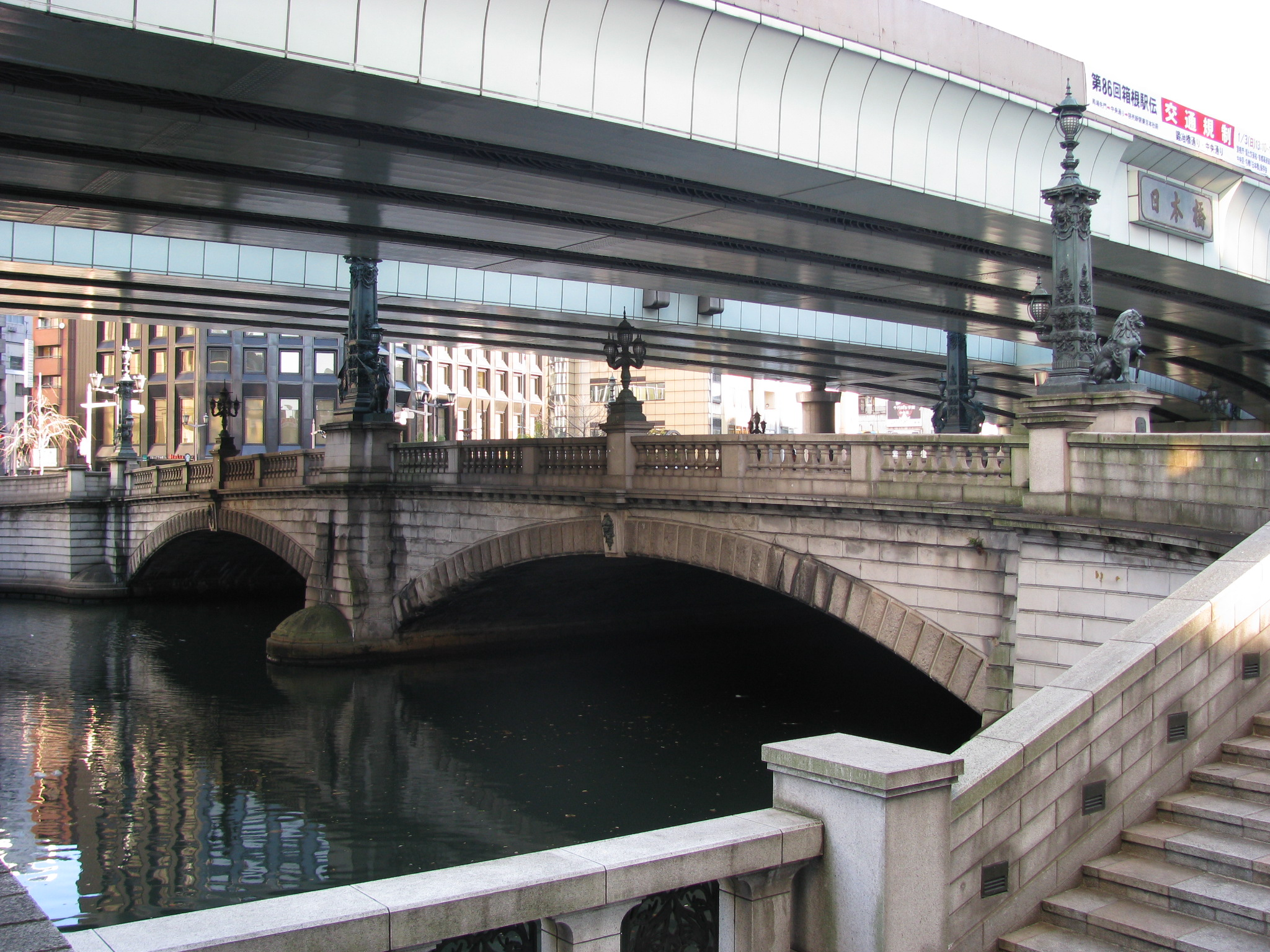
Nihonbashi in Tokyo

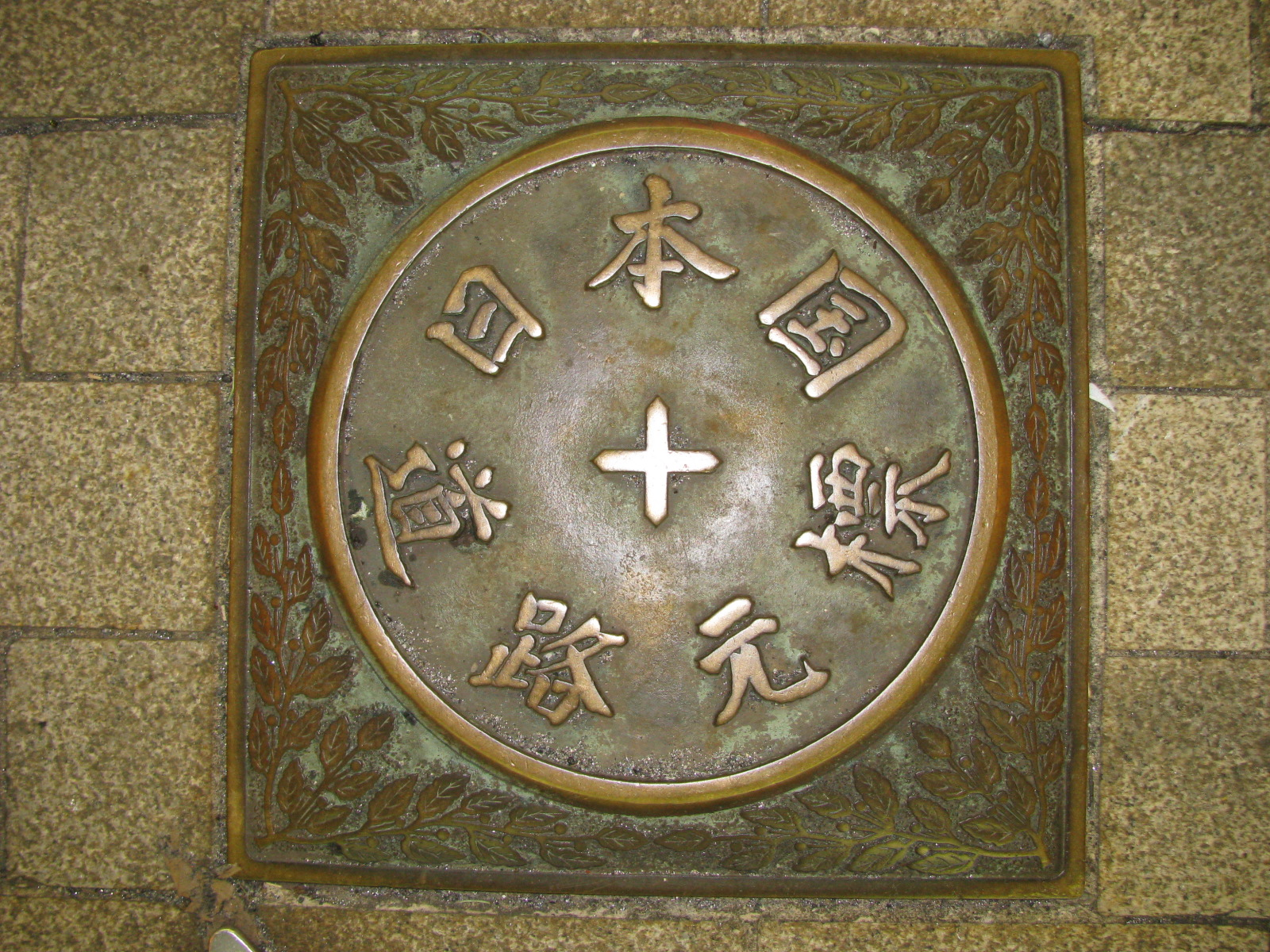
0 km post of Japanese Roads in Tokyo

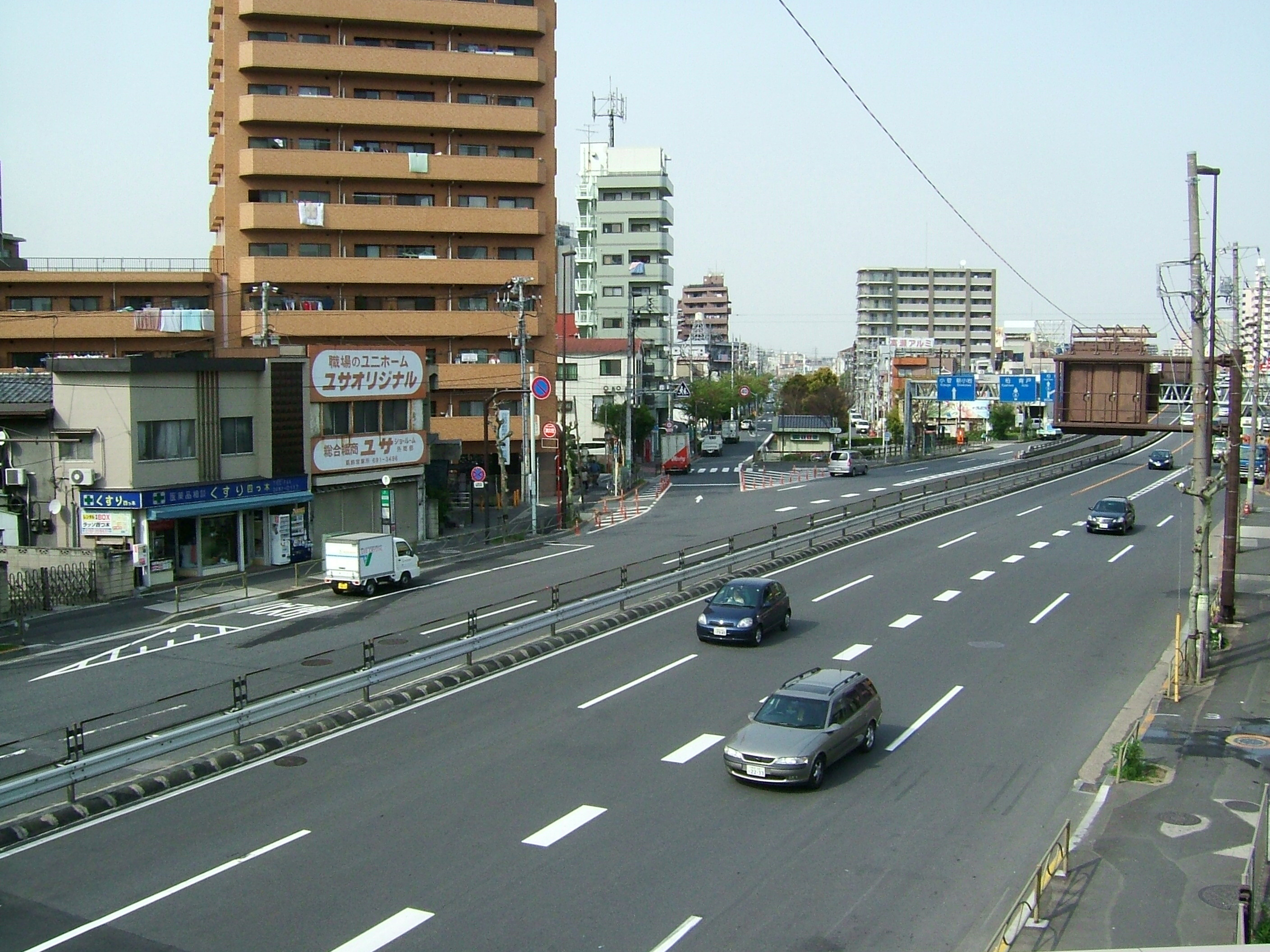
Route 6 at Yotsugi in Tokyo

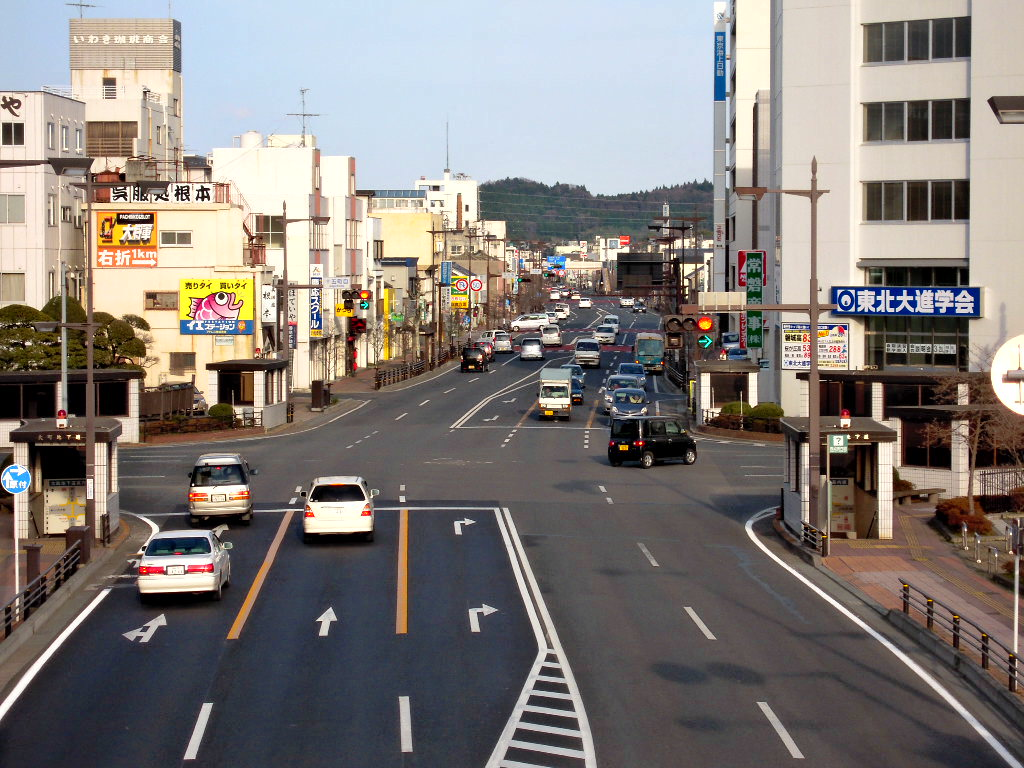
Route 6 at Fifteenth Chōme in Iwaki

National Route 6 (国道6号, Kokudō Roku-gō) is a Japanese highway from Tokyo to Sendai that goes through the cities Mito, Iwaki and Sōma. It traces the old Mito Kaidō route from Tokyo to Mito, and, for much of its 353.6-kilometer (219.7 mi) route, it runs parallel to the Jōban railway line and the Jōban Expressway.

== Route description ==
Originating in Chūō, Tokyo (at Nihonbashi, which also marks the origins of Routes 1, 4, 14, 15, 17 and 20), it ends in Miyagino-ku, Sendai (at the Nigatake interchange, junction with Route 45, also the origin of Route 47)

Major cities and villages it passes through include: Kashiwa, Toride, Tsuchiura, Ishioka, Mito, Hitachi, Iwaki, Tomioka, Ōkuma, Sōma, Watari, Iwanuma

The actual terminus is Iwanuma in Miyagi (at the Fujinami intersection) which is the junction of Routes 4 and 6. In the areas north of Iwanuma which overlap with the Route 4, signboards for Route 6 are not posted. The distance from Tokyo to Iwanuma is 334.0 kilometers (207.5 mi). This is equivalent to the distance from Mito to Kakegawa / Ichinoseki.

=== Overlapping sections ===
The following sections of Route 6 overlap with other routes:

- In Chuo, Tokyo, from the origin point to Muromachi intersection: Route 17
- In Chuo, Tokyo, from the origin point to Honchō 3-chōme intersection: Route 4
- In Chuo, Tokyo, from the origin point to Asakusa-bashi intersection: Route 14
- From Kashiwa, Chiba to Toride: Route 294
- In Tsuchiura: Route 125 and Route 354
- In Ishioka: Route 355

=== Effects of the Fukushima Daiichi nuclear disaster ===
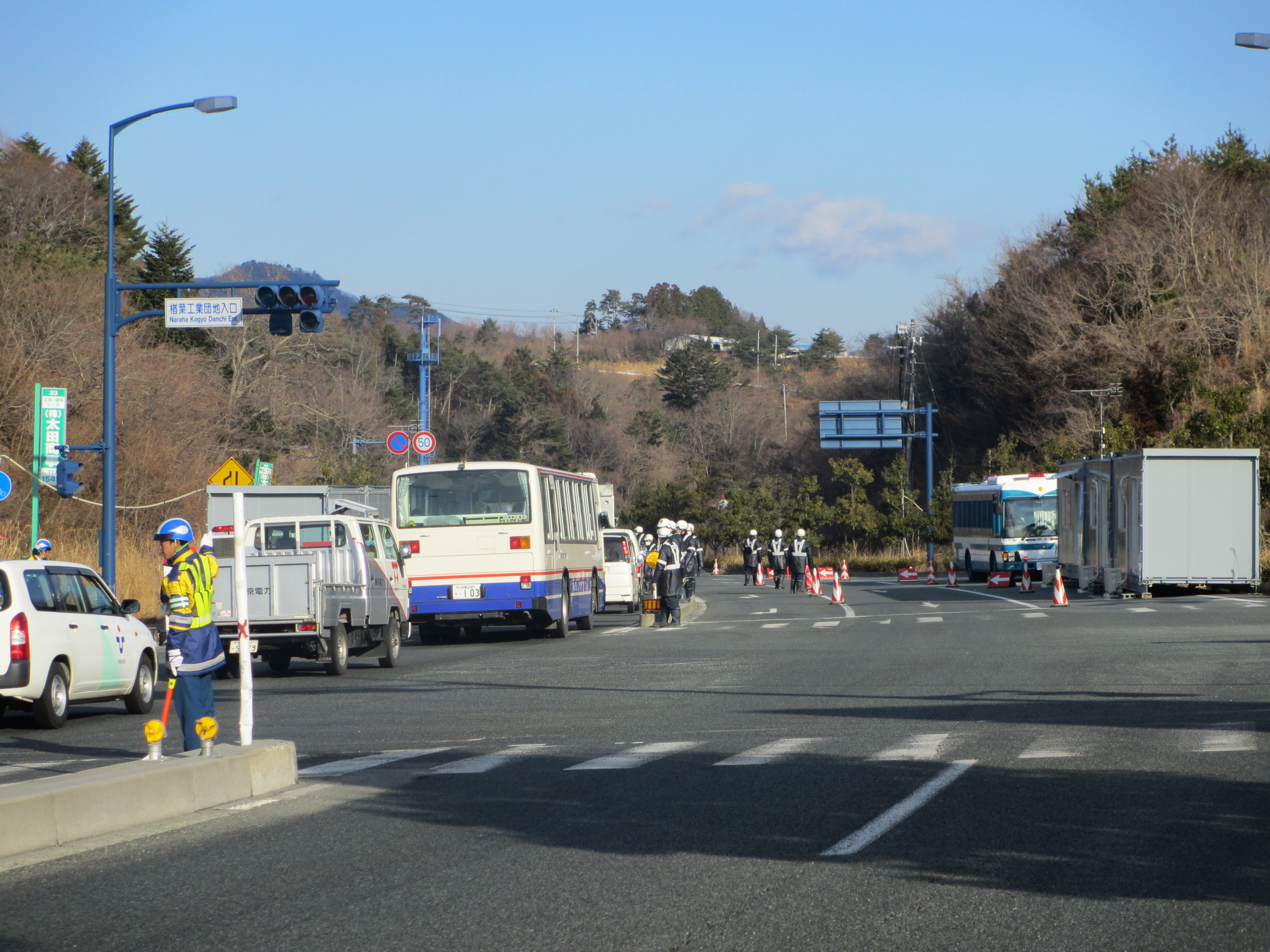
Nuclear exclusion barrier at Naraha (27 February 2012)

One side of National Route 6 is known as the "nuclear dense zone". Tōkaimura (the first nuclear power plant of Japan), Ōkuma (center of the Fukushima Daiichi nuclear disaster) and Naraha (location of the Fukushima Daini Nuclear Power Plant) are located on adjacent of Route 6.

Due to the nuclear disaster, access is prohibited to a zone of 20 kilometers (12 mi) radius from the Fukushima Daiichi Nuclear Power Plant. National Route 6 was blocked for non-authorized traffic between Hirono (the Iwaki side) and Haranomachi (the Sōma side). The ban was lifted in September 2014 after the road decontamination, and vehicles (with exception of motorcycles and bicycles) are now allowed on the stretch of road.

== History ==
National Route 6 is a part of the lengthened Tōkaidō which connects the Kansai region (Kinai), or Nara and Kyoto in particular, and the Pacific coast of Tōhoku (called the Tagajō). During the Ritsuryō period, roads from Kinai to the Tagajō were divided into two: the Tōkaidō eastern sea road (via Nagoya, Hamamatsu, Tokyo and Mito) and the Tōsandō eastern mountain road (via Gifu, Shiojiri, Takasaki and Utsunomiya). During the foundation of Kamakura Kanagawa, Ritsiryō Tōkaidō was divided into two roads: the westward Tōkaidō which connects southern Kantō (Kamakura, Edo, Tokyo) and Kyoto, and the northward Tōkaidō which connects southern Kantō and Pacific coasts of Tōhoku. Since the foundation of Edo, Tōkaidō was narrowed by the Tokugawa Shogunate, the westward Tōkaidō functioned as a seaside road to Kyoto and the northward Tōkaidō functioned as one to the Pacific coasts of Tōhoku.

On 4 December 1952 the Ritsuryō Tōkaidō north of Tokyo was designated First Class National Highway 6, while the other section was designated as National Route 1. On 1 April 1965 the route was re-designated as General National Highway 6. On 12 March 2011, access to a large section of National Route 6 was restricted due to the Fukushima Daiichi nuclear disaster between Hirono and Haranomachi.

== List of major junctions ==
- Route 16 in Kashiwa: Ōmiya, Saitama (west) and Chiba (southeast)
- Route 125 in Tsuchiura: Koga, Ibaraki and Kumagaya (west) and Kashima, Ibaraki and Katori, Chiba (east)
- Route 50 in Mito, Ibaraki: Utsunomiya, Oyama, Tochigi, and Takasaki
- Route 51 in Mito: Kashima and Narita
- Route 461 in Takahagi: Ōtawara, Nikkō, and Numata, Gunma
- Route 289 in Nakoso (southern Iwaki): Shirakawa, Tajima, and Tadami, Fukushima
- Route 49 in Iwaki, Fukushima: Kōriyama, Aizuwakamatsu, and Niigata
- Route 288 in Ōkuma, Fukushima: Kōriyama, Aizuwakamatsu, and Niigata
- Route 115 in Sōma, Fukushima: Fukushima (Nakadōri), Inawashiro, and Yonezawa, Murakami
- Route 113 in Shinchi, Fukushima : Shiroishi, Miyagi, Nanyō, Yamagata, and Murakami
