= Dedham Vale =

Dedham Vale may refer to

- Dedham Vale National Landscape, a designated Area of Outstanding Natural Beauty in England
- Dedham Vale (painting), an 1802 painting by John Constable
- The Vale of Dedham (painting), an 1828 painting by John Constable
