= Dedham Vale (painting) =

Painting by John Constable

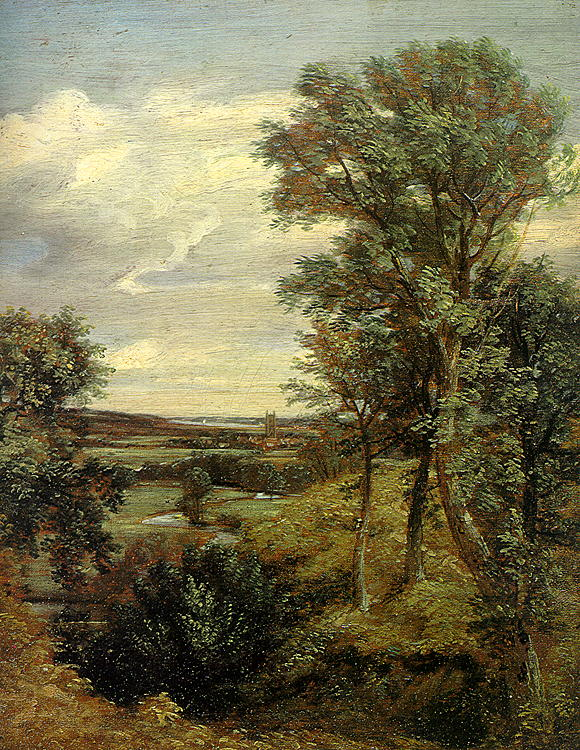
- Artist: John Constable
- Year: 1802
- Type: Oil on canvas, landscape painting
- Dimensions: 43.5 cm × 34.5 cm (17.1 in × 13.6 in)
- Location: Victoria and Albert Museum, London

Dedham Vale is an 1802 landscape painting by the British artist John Constable. It depicts a view of Dedham Vale on the border of Suffolk and Essex.

Although Constable displayed an untitled landscape at the Royal Academy Exhibition of 1802 at Somerset House, his exhibition debut, it is not known whether this was the work in question. The painting is now in the collection of the Victoria and Albert Museum having been donated by the artist's daughter Isabel in 1888 as part of the Constable Bequest. In 1828 Constable produced a painting with a similar view The Vale of Dedham which is now in the Scottish National Gallery.

== See also ==
- List of paintings by John Constable

== Bibliography ==
- Bailey, Anthony. John Constable: A Kingdom of his Own. Random House, 2012.
- Boime, Albert. A Social History of Modern Art, Volume 2: Art in an Age of Bonapartism, 1800-1815. University of Chicago Press, 1993.
- Charles, Victoria. Constable. Parkstone International, 2015.
- Hamilton, James. Constable: A Portrait. Hachette UK, 2022.
- Reynolds, Graham. Constable's England. Metropolitan Museum of Art, 1983.
- Thornes, John E. John Constable's Skies: A Fusion of Art and Science. A&C Black, 1999.
