= Kōriyama City Museum of Art =

- 郡山市立美術館
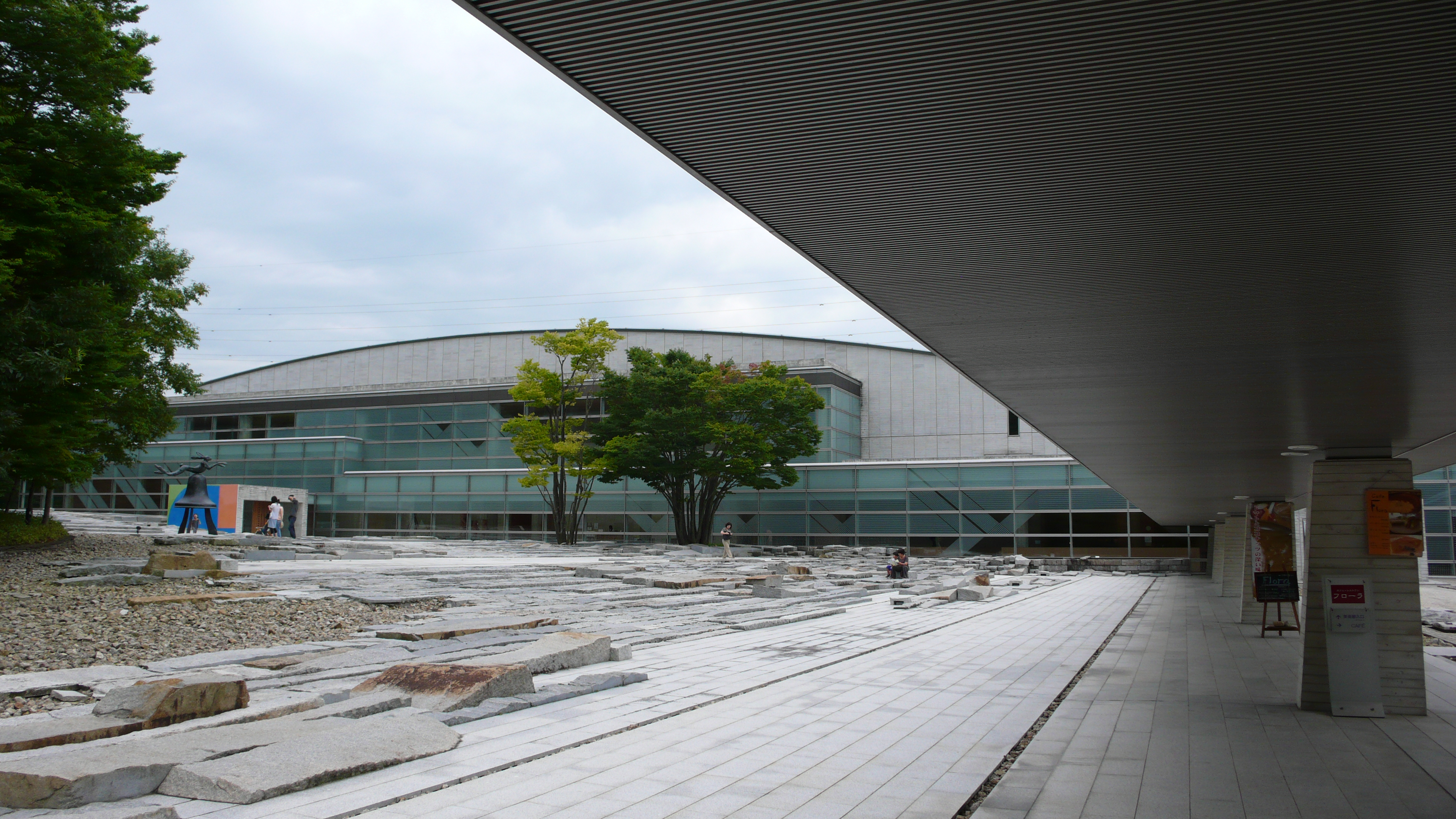

General information
- Location: 130-2 Ōyaji, Aza, Yasuhara-machi, Kōriyama, Fukushima Prefecture, Japan
- Coordinates: 37°23′34″N 140°25′11″E
- Opened: November 1992

Website
- Official website

Kōriyama City Museum of Art (郡山市立美術館, Kōriyama shiritsu bijutsukan) opened in 1992 in Kōriyama, Fukushima Prefecture, Japan. The collection includes works by Thomas Gainsborough, John Constable, J. M. W. Turner, Edward Burne-Jones, and John William Waterhouse, as well as Japanese artists Shiba Kōkan, Takahashi Yuichi, Fujishima Takeji, and Kishida Ryūsei. The museum also includes works by artists associated with Kōriyama.

== See also ==
- Fukushima Prefectural Museum of Art
- List of Cultural Properties of Japan - paintings (Fukushima)
