= List of cultural properties of Japan – paintings (Fukushima) =

This list is of the cultural properties of Japan designated in the category of paintings (絵画, kaiga) for the Prefecture of Fukushima.

== National Cultural Properties ==
As of 1 July 2020, five Important Cultural Properties have been designated, being of national significance.

Property	Date	Municipality	Ownership	Comments	Image	Dimensions	Coordinates	Ref.
Descent of Amida with Twenty-Five Bodhisattvas, colour on silk 絹本著色阿弥陀二十五菩薩来迎図 kenpon chakushoku Amida nijūgo bosatsu raigō zu	Kamakura period	Aizuwakamatsu	Fukushima Museum				37°29′20″N 139°56′05″E	
Miroku, colour on silk 絹本著色弥勒菩薩像 kenpon chakushoku Miroku bosatsu zō	C13	Iwaki	Yakuōji (薬王寺)			155 centimetres (61 in) by 58.8 centimetres (23.1 in)	37°06′57″N 140°55′07″E	
Gamō Ujisato, colour on paper 紙本著色蒲生氏郷像 shihon chakushoku Gamō Ujisato zō	1621	Aizuwakamatsu	Saikōji (西光寺) (kept at Fukushima Museum)				37°29′20″N 139°56′05″E	
Famous Places in the Eastern Capital, copperplates by Aōdō Denzen 銅版画東都名所図〈亜欧堂田善筆／（二十五図）〉 dōhanga tōto meisho zu	1748–1822	Sukagawa	Sukagawa City Museum (須賀川市立博物館)	series of twenty-five prints; the designation includes a sample book			37°17′29″N 140°22′45″E	
Amida Triad, colour on silk 絹本著色阿弥陀三尊像 kenpon chakushoku Amida sanzon zō	C13	Taitō, Tokyo	Iwaki City (kept at the Tokyo National Museum)			323.5 centimetres (127.4 in) by 166.8 centimetres (65.7 in)	35°43′08″N 139°46′35″E	

== Prefectural Cultural Properties ==
As of 18 February 2020, twenty-seven properties have been designated at a prefectural level.

Property	Date	Municipality	Ownership	Comments	Image	Dimensions	Coordinates	Ref.
Shichirigahama, colour on silk 絹本著色七里ヶ浜図 kenpon chakushoku Shichirigahama zu	1748–1822	Koori	Shutoku Museum (種徳美術館)	by Aōdō Denzen (亜欧堂田善)			37°50′36″N 140°31′07″E	for all refs see
Bamboo, flowers, and birds, colour with gold ground on paper 紙本金地著色叢竹花鳥図 shihon kinji chakushoku muratake kachō zu	Edo period	Koori	Shutoku Museum (種徳美術館)	pair of six-panel byōbu			37°50′36″N 140°31′07″E	
Poetry Gathering at the Orchid Pavilion 蘭亭曲水図 rantei kyokusui zu	late Edo period	Date	Hobara Museum of History and Culture (伊達市保原歴史文化資料館)	by Tekizan Kumasaka (熊坂適山)		56.3 centimetres (22.2 in) by 84.3 centimetres (33.2 in)	37°49′11″N 140°34′11″E	
Southerly View of Tsukuda Island, ema 絵馬佃島南望之図 ema Tsukuda-shima nanbō no zu	late Edo period	Kōriyama	Tamura Jinja (田村神社)	by Endō Denichi (遠藤田一)			37°24′30″N 140°24′51″E	
Mount Ōe, ema 絵馬大江山図 ema Ōeyama zu		Kōriyama	Tamura Jinja (田村神社)				37°24′30″N 140°24′51″E	
Three Great Personages from Records of the Three Kingdoms, ema 絵馬三国志三傑図 ema Sangokushi sanketsu zu		Kōriyama	Tamura Jinja (田村神社)				37°24′30″N 140°24′51″E	
Aōdō Denzen, colour on silk 絹本著色亜欧堂田善画像 kenpon chakushoku Aōdō Denzen gazō	1822	Sukagawa	private	by Endō Denichi (遠藤田一)				
Hanawa Hokiichi, colour on silk 絹本著色塙保己一像 kenpon chakushoku Hanawa Hokiichi zō	1821	Iwaki	private			172.7 centimetres (68.0 in) by 55.7 centimetres (21.9 in)	36°53′37″N 140°45′27″E	

== See also ==
- Cultural Properties of Japan
- List of National Treasures of Japan (paintings)
- Japanese painting
- List of Historic Sites of Japan (Fukushima)
- List of Places of Scenic Beauty of Japan (Fukushima)
