= The Vale of Dedham (painting) =

Painting by John Constable

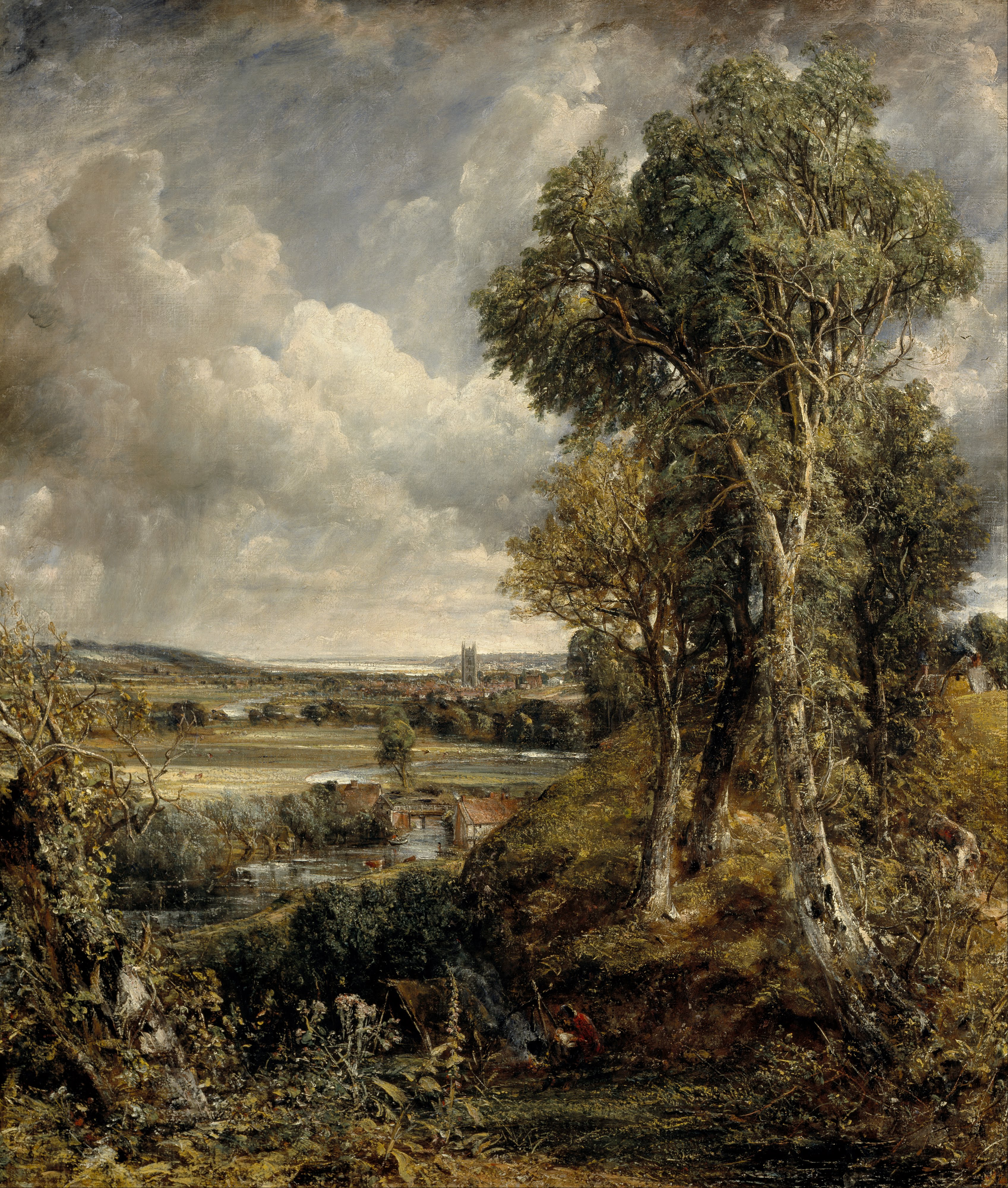
- Artist: John Constable
- Year: 1828
- Medium: Oil on canvas
- Dimensions: 144.5 cm × 122 cm (56.9 in × 48 in)
- Location: Scottish National Gallery; Edinburgh
- Accession: NG 2016

The Vale of Dedham is an 1828 oil painting by the English painter John Constable which depicts Dedham Vale on the Essex-Suffolk border in eastern England. It is in the permanent collection of the Scottish National Gallery, Edinburgh.

Scholars believe the subject of the painting references Constable's inspiration from Claude Lorrain's Hagar and the Angel, and the painting was meant to pay homage to Claude. The small, ridged shelter in the foreground, with a woman nursing a child, may have actually been real, rather than an imaginary and sentimental addition by Constable.

The view from Gun Hill along the River Stour to Dedham village and the distant Stour estuary was a favourite subject of Constable which he painted several times, most noticeably the 1802 version Dedham Vale in the Victoria and Albert Museum.

In this work, the paint is thickly applied with touches of white to emphasise the reflection of sunlight. It was displayed at the Royal Academy Exhibition of 1828 held at Somerset House in London. The work was primarily responsible for his election as a full member to the prestigious Royal Academy of Arts in 1829.

== See also ==
- List of paintings by John Constable
- Dedham Vale, 1802, Victoria and Albert Museum
- Dedham Vale, 1802, Yale Center for British Art
- Dedham Vale, 1802, Kōriyama City Museum of Art, Koriyama, Japan
- Dedham Vale, 1810, Dayton Art Institute
