= List of places of scenic beauty of Japan (Fukushima) =

This list is of the places of scenic beauty of Japan located within the Prefecture of Fukushima.

== National Places of Scenic Beauty ==
As of 1 June 2024, five Places have been designated at a national level; Landscape of Oku no Hosomichi is a serial designation spanning ten prefectures.

Site	Municipality	Comments	Image	Coordinates	Type	Ref.
Aizu Matsudaira Family Gardens 会津松平氏庭園; Aizu Matsudaira-shi teien	Aizuwakamatsu			37°29′27″N 139°56′38″E	1	
Sukagawa Peony Garden 須賀川の牡丹園; Sukagawa no botan-en	Sukagawa			37°16′24″N 140°23′23″E	1, 3	
Nanko Park 南湖公園; Nanko kōen	Shirakawa	also an Historic Site		37°06′37″N 140°12′57″E	1	
Mount Ryōzen 霊山; Ryōzen	Date/Sōma	also an Historic Site		37°46′27″N 140°40′59″E	5, 10, 11	
Landscape of Oku no Hosomichi - Kurozuka-no-Iwaya おくのほそ道の風景地 黒塚の岩屋; Oku no Hosomichi no fūkei-chi Kurozuka-no-iwaya	Nihonmatsu	designation spans ten prefectures		37°35′39″N 140°27′48″E		

== Prefectural Places of Scenic Beauty ==
As of 1 April 2024, eight Places have been designated at a prefectural level.

Site	Municipality	Comments	Image	Coordinates	Type	Ref.
Yanagawa Castle Site and Gardens 梁川城跡及び庭園; Yanagawa-jō ato oyobi teien	Date	also a Prefectural Historic Site		37°51′19″N 140°36′41″E		for all refs see
Former Yanagawa Kameoka Hachiman-gū and Temple Grounds 旧梁川亀岡八幡宮並びに別当寺境域 kyū-Yanagawa Kameoka Hachimangū narabini bettōji kyōiki	Date	also a Prefectural Historic Site		37°51′59″N 140°36′46″E		
Senshō-ji Grounds 専称寺境域; Senshōji kyōiki	Iwaki	also a Prefectural Historic Site		37°03′25″N 140°55′36″E		
Former Kai Family Gardens 旧甲斐家庭園 kyū-Kai-ke teien	Kitakata			37°39′23″N 139°52′20″E		
Abukuma-kyō 阿武隈峡; Abukuma-kyō	Fukushima	also a Prefectural Natural Monument		37°38′41″N 140°31′41″E		
Mount Kohata 木幡山; Kohata-yama	Nihonmatsu	also a Prefectural Natural Monument		37°37′35″N 140°34′51″E		
Mount Iwatsuno 岩角山; Iwatsuno-san	Motomiya	also a Prefectural Natural Monument		37°32′17″N 140°27′17″E		
Mount Jōdomatsu 浄土松山; Jōdomatsu-san	Kōriyama	also a Prefectural Natural Monument		37°23′18″N 140°16′29″E		

== Municipal Places of Scenic Beauty ==
As of 1 May 2023, sixteen Places have been designated at a municipal level.

== Registered Places of Scenic Beauty ==
As of 24 June 2024, one Monument has been registered (as opposed to designated) as a Place of Scenic Beauty at a national level.

Place	Municipality	Comments	Image	Coordinates	Type	Ref.
Aizu Higashiyama Onsen Mukaitaki Gardens 会津東山温泉向瀧庭園; Aizu Higashiyama-onsen Mukaitaki-teien	Aizuwakamatsu			37°28′41″N 139°57′40″E		

== See also ==
- Cultural Properties of Japan
- List of Historic Sites of Japan (Fukushima)
- List of parks and gardens of Fukushima Prefecture
- List of Cultural Properties of Japan – paintings (Fukushima)
