= Sukagawa Peony Garden =

Garden in Sukagawa, Japan

- 須賀川牡丹園
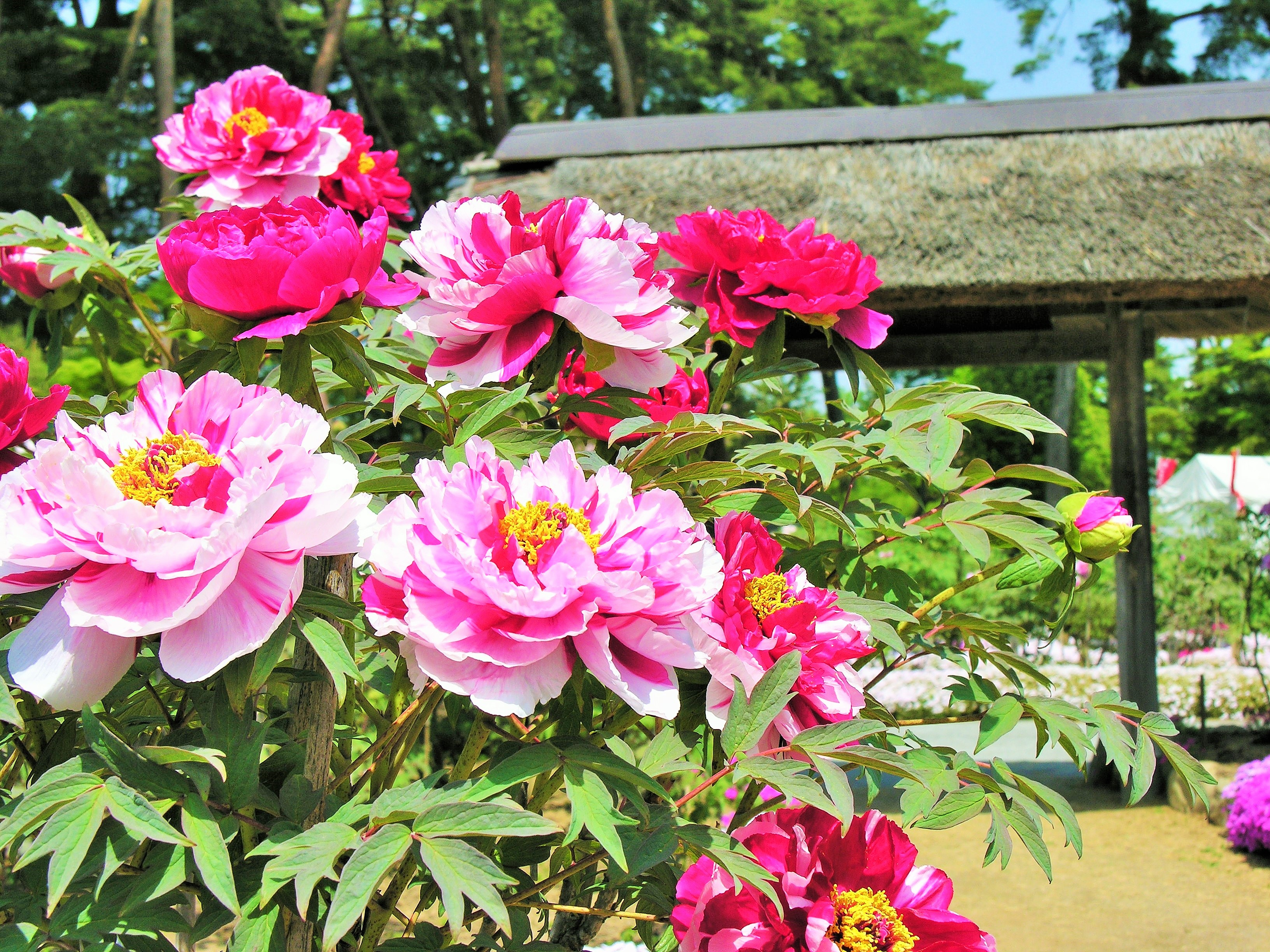

- Location within Fukushima Prefecture Location within Japan
- Type: Urban park
- Location: Sukagawa, Fukushima, Japan
- Coordinates: 37°16′24″N 140°23′22″E
- Area: 10 ha (25 acres)
- Created: 1766
- Operator: private
- National Palace of Scenic Beauty

Sukagawa Peony Garden (須賀川牡丹園, Sukawaga Botan-en) is a nationally designated Place of Scenic Beauty in the city of Sukagawa, Fukushima Prefecture, Japan.

== Overview ==
The Sukagawa Peony Garden was laid out in 1766 by Itō Yutono, a herbalist who brought peony seedlings from Settsu Province (currently Takarazuka, Hyōgo), in order to cultivate for their roots as an ingredient in Chinese herbal medicine. The gardens came into the hands of the Yaginuma family at the start of the Meiji period and were expanded both in area and in the varieties of peony under cultivation. It was designated as a National Place of Scenic Beauty in 1932. The gardens currently cover 10 hectares and contain an estimated 7000 plants in 290 species.

== See also ==
- List of Places of Scenic Beauty of Japan (Fukushima)
