= Dedham Lock and Mill =

Painting by John Constable

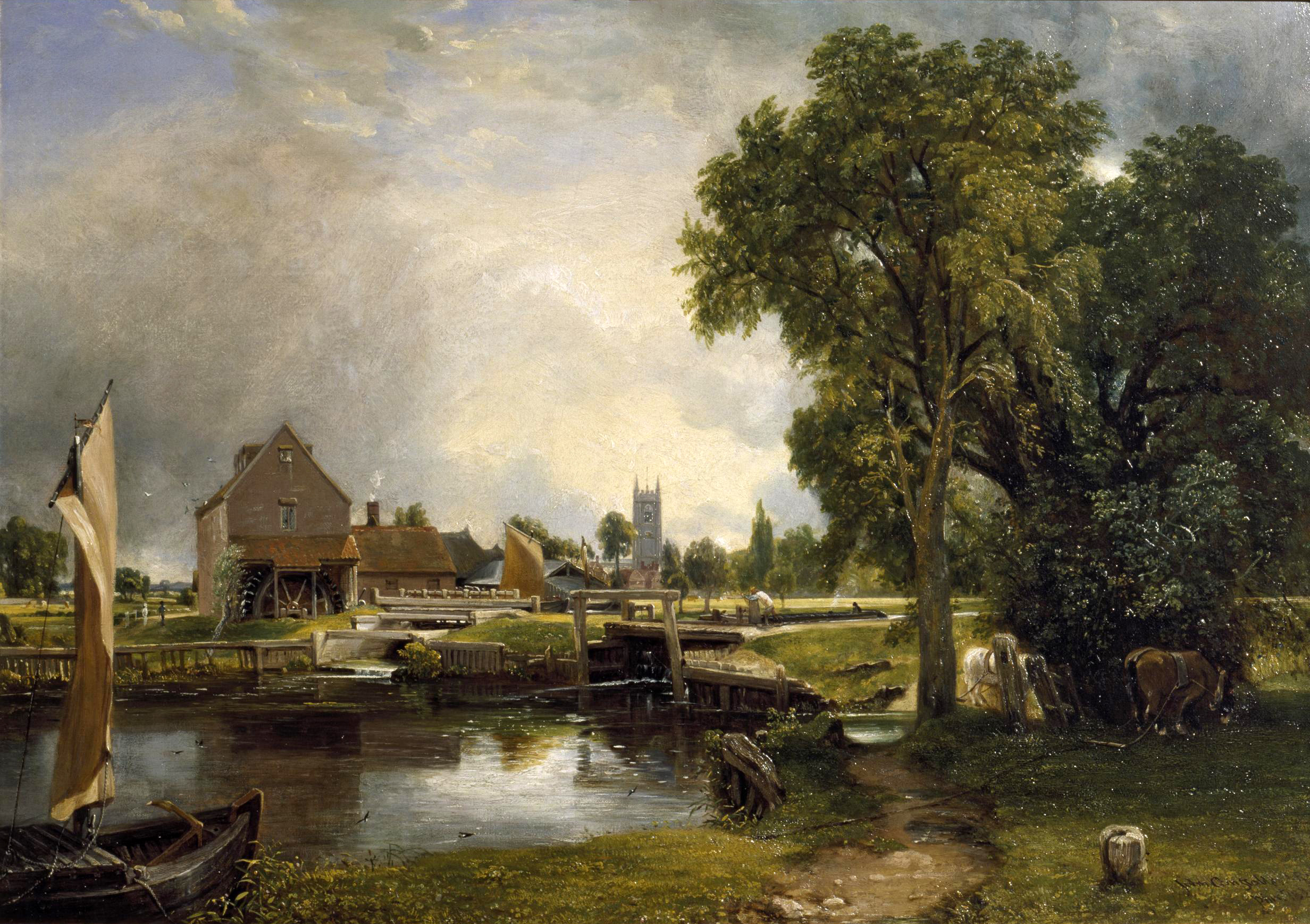
- Version in the Victoria and Albert Museum
- Artist: John Constable
- Year: c. 1820
- Type: Oil on canvas, landscape painting
- Dimensions: 53.7 cm × 76.2 cm (21.1 in × 30.0 in)
- Location: Victoria and Albert Museum, London

Dedham Lock and Mill is an c.1820 landscape painting by the English artist John Constable. It shows a view of the River Stour at Dedham in Essex close to the border of his native Suffolk, an area now known as "Constable Country". Constable's father owned the mill as well as nearby Flatford Mill, which he painted on numerous occasions. St Mary's Church is seen in the distance.

There is a possibility that the work was begun in 1817 and exhibited at the Royal Academy's Summer Exhibition in 1818. However the 1820 date for this work is more likely and is the date Constable gave it and which his friend and biographer Charles Robert Leslie gave to it. Several variations of it now exist including one in the Currier Museum of Art in New Hampshire. The oil sketch is now in the collection of the Victoria and Albert Museum in London, having been donated as part of the Sheepshanks Gift by the art collector John Sheepshanks in 1857.

== See also ==
- List of paintings by John Constable

== Bibliography ==
- Cole, Bruce & Gealt, Adelheid M. Art of the Western World: From Ancient Greece to Post Modernism. Simon and Schuster, 1991.
- Hamilton, James. Constable: A Portrait. Hachette UK, 2022.
- Reynolds, Graham. Constable's England. Metropolitan Museum of Art, 1983.
