= Aōdō Denzen =

Japanese painter

- 亜欧堂 田善
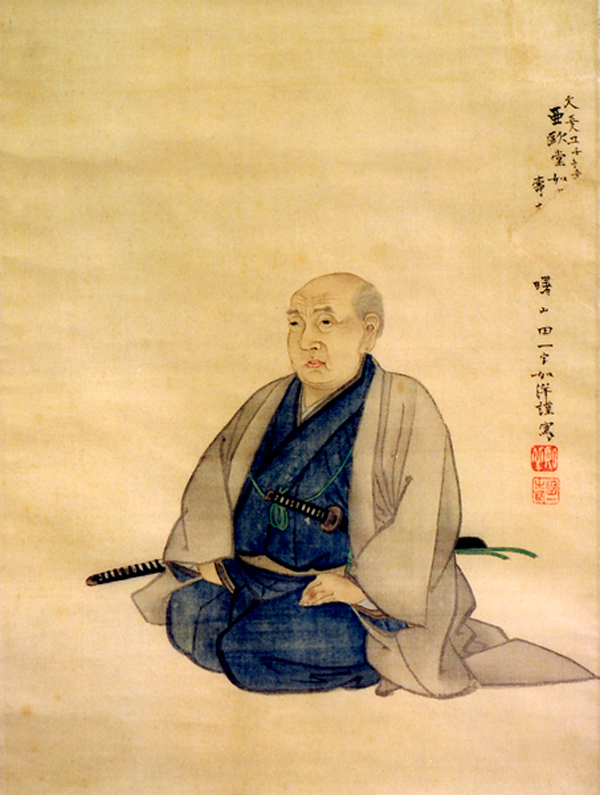
- Portrait of Aōdō by Endō Denichi
- Born: Zenkichi Nagata (永田 善吉, Nagata Zenkichi) c. 1748; Sukagawa, Mutsu Province, Japan
- Died: June 25, 1822 (aged 73–74)
- Other name: Aeudoo Denzento
- Occupations: Painter, copperplate engraver
- Relatives: Eiji Tsuburaya (descendant)

Aōdō Denzen (亜欧堂 田善; c. 1748 – June 25, 1822) was a Japanese painter and copperplate engraver. A leading figure in Japanese painting during the late Edo period, he is credited with introducing Western painting to Japan.

== Biography ==
=== Early life ===
Aōdō was born Zenkichi Nagata (永田 善吉, Nagata Zenkichi) in 1748 in Sukagawa, Mutsu Province (now Fukushima Prefecture), Japan. He was the second son of Sōshirō Nagata, a wealthy farm implement dealer. Upon the death of his father, he helped his older brother, Jokichi, who was a dyer, for a long time. Jokichi had a penchant for painting, and while working in the family business, Zenkichi learned painting from him.

=== Painting career ===
In his painting career, Aōdō employed Western-style painting techniques such as perspective and shading to achieve Western-style copperplate engraving. Adding Edo customs to Shiba Kokan's Western-style landscape paintings, he discovered new landscapes and perfected Western-style landscape copperplate engravings.

== Legacy ==
Sadaki Ota's Aōdō Denzen Collection, owned by the Sukagawa museum, was declared an important culturally significant in 1986. In 2001, Eiji Tsuburaya biographers cited Aōdō as an ancestor of Tsuburaya, claiming Tsuburaya inherited Aōdō's dexterity.
