= Dedham Vale National Landscape =

Area of Outstanding Natural Beauty in England

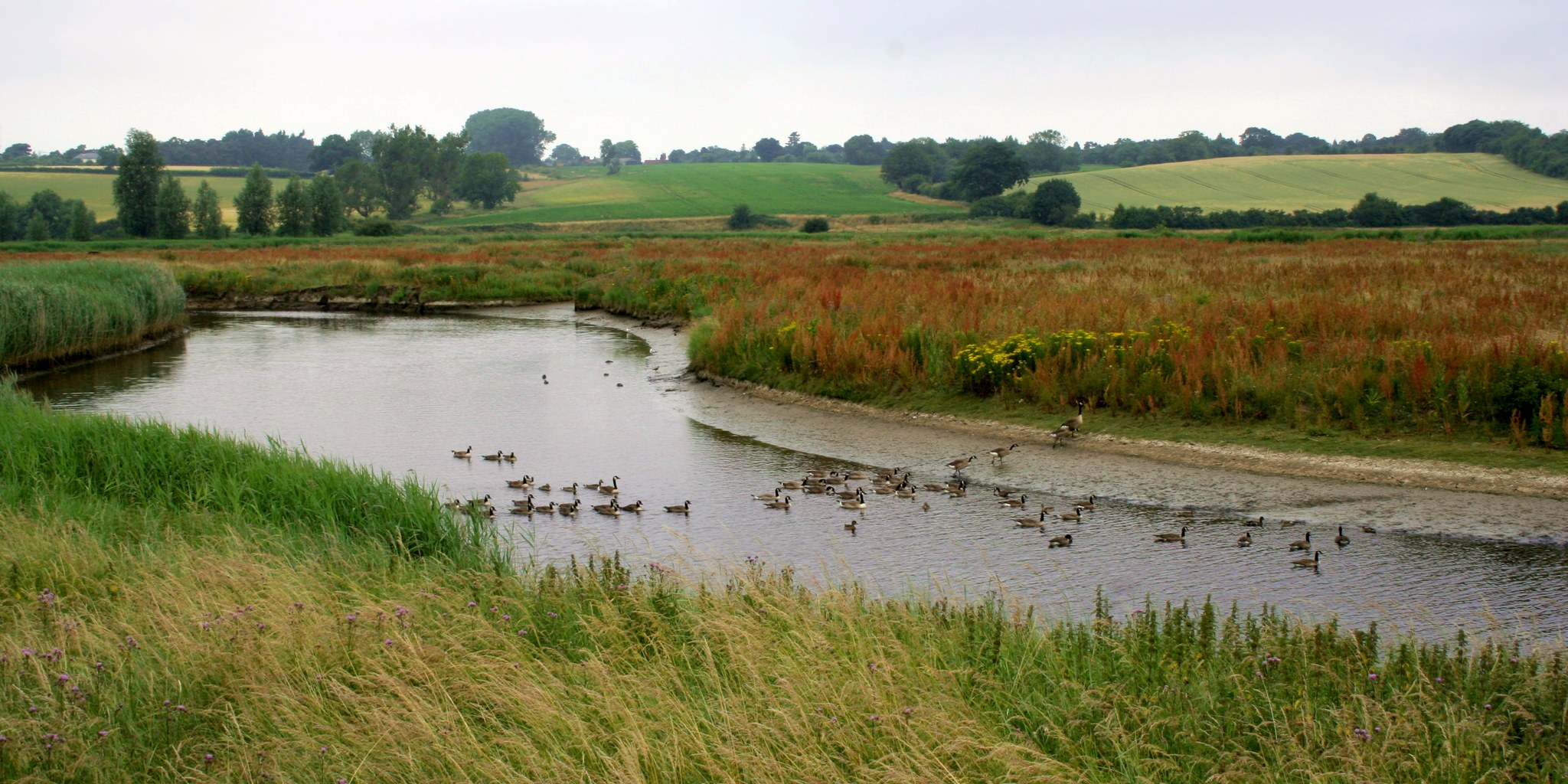
- River Stour near Manningtree

- AONB location within England
- Location: England
- Coordinates: 51.9716°N 0.9459°E

Dedham Vale National Landscape is a designated Area of Outstanding Natural Beauty on the Essex-Suffolk border in east England. It comprises the area around the River Stour between Manningtree and Smallbridge Farm, 1 mile (1.6 km) east of Bures, including the village of Dedham in Essex.

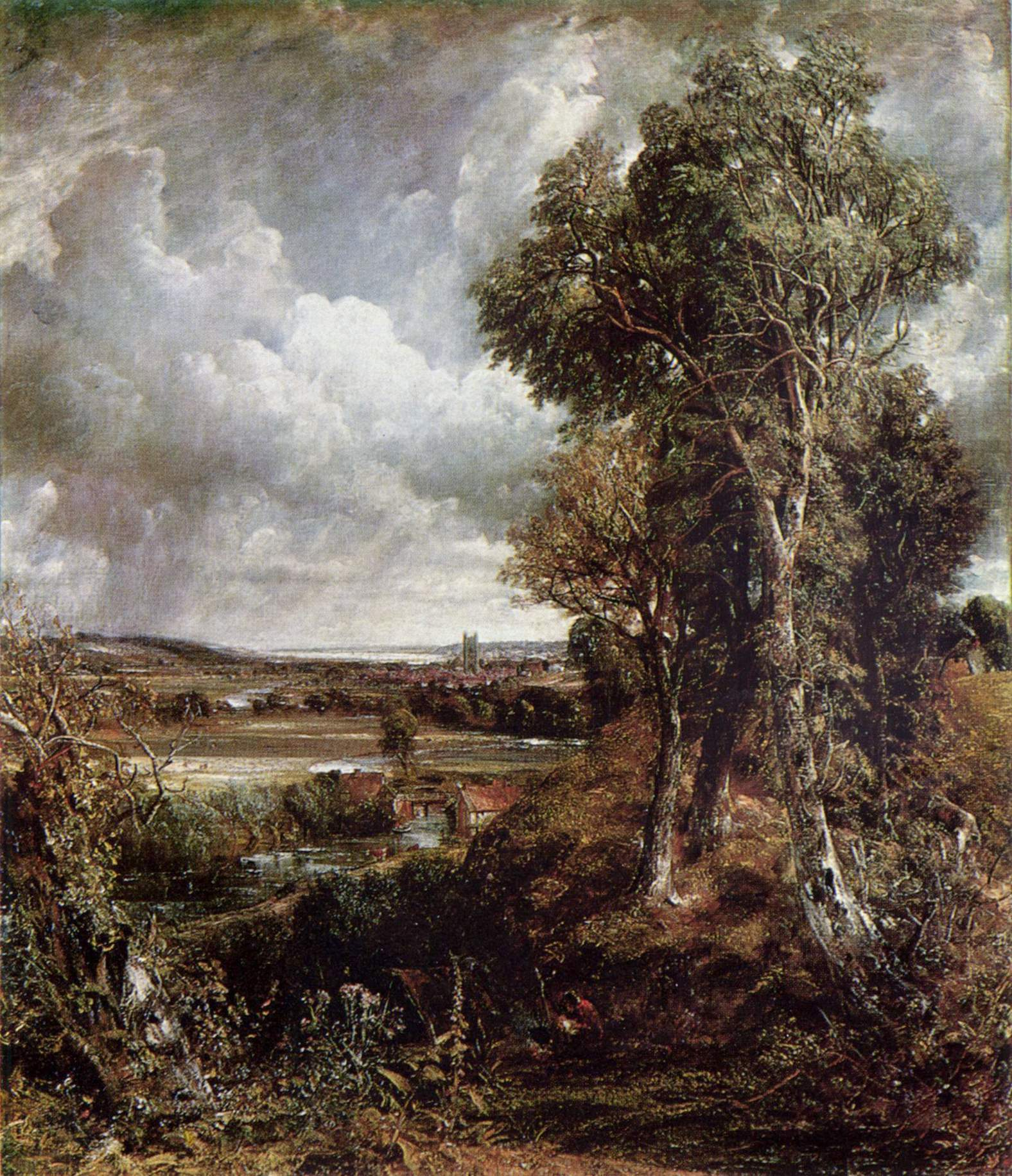
John Constable's Dedham Vale of 1828

It is part of the area known as Constable Country, as it was made famous by the paintings of the English Romantic painter John Constable. Among many other works of the area are his Dedham Vale paintings of 1802 and 1828, held in the Victoria and Albert Museum in London and the Scottish National Gallery in Edinburgh.

== Land use ==
Dedham Vale supports a viable and diverse agriculture with a mix of farm sizes. The majority of the land in the valley is still farmed despite development pressures. Farming is the primary tool for supporting the area's landscape and wildlife. Arger Fen, a Site of Special Scientific Interest, contains areas of ancient woodland, meadow and fen.

== Geology ==
Throughout the valley Eocene and glacial deposits overlay chalk deposited during the Cretaceous period. London Clay and sands are often exposed on the valley sides as the river and its tributaries cut through the deposits. The composition of these layers and where they occur is paramount in determining what species will grow, which habitats can occur and how the area is farmed.

== River ==
The River Stour is the key landscape focus for the valley, its course is defined by bank-side trees and wet meadows. It supports a variety of riparian (river) habitats.

The valley floor has a large areas of functioning floodplain. Water quality is good, meeting levels demanded in regulations. The catchment meets sustainable demands for water supply, flood control and recreational use, whilst retaining an unspoilt character and healthy ecosystem.

The river has become an important method of controlling water levels both in the surrounding countryside and irrigating crops.

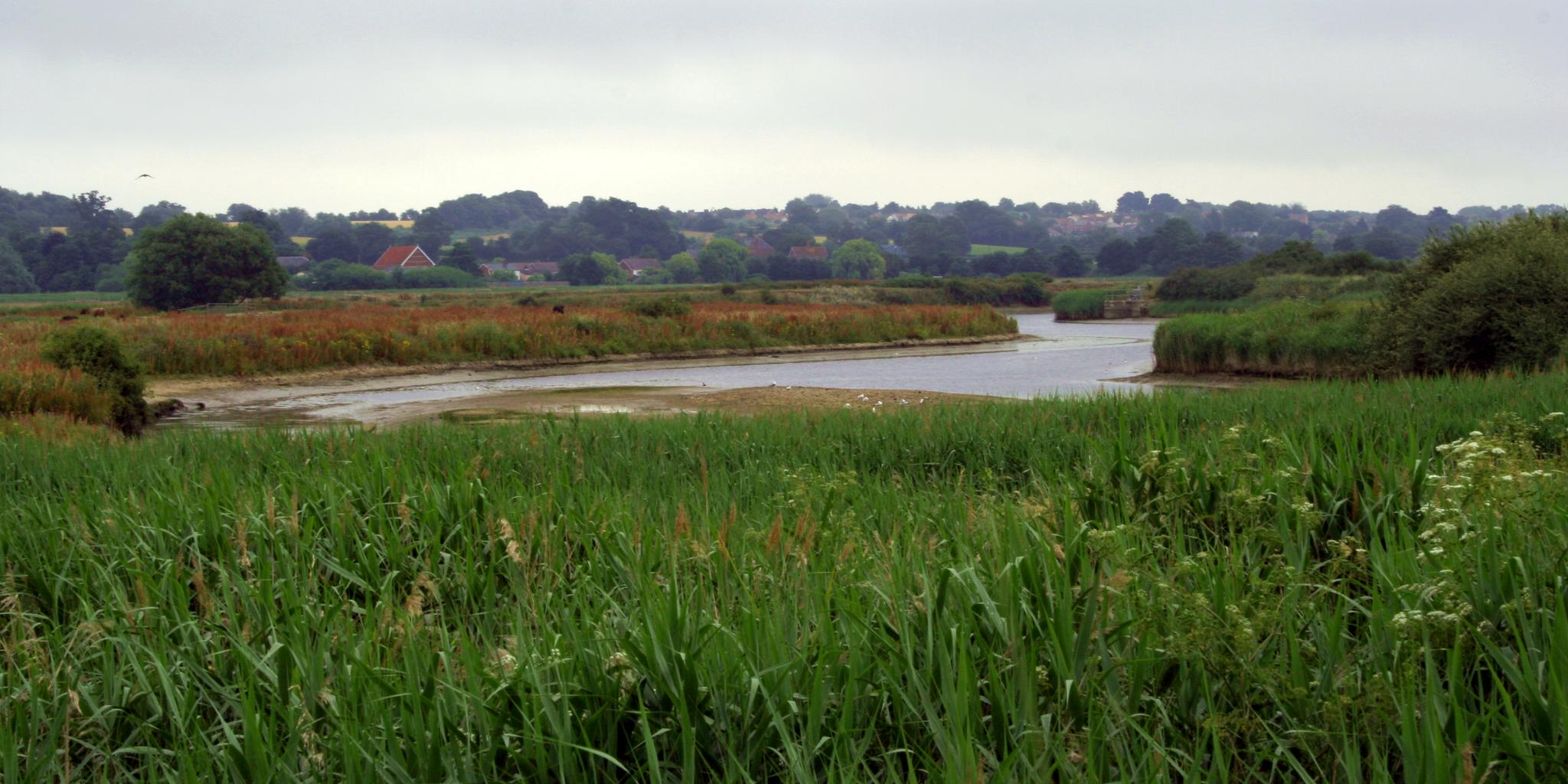
Dedham Vale near Manningtree

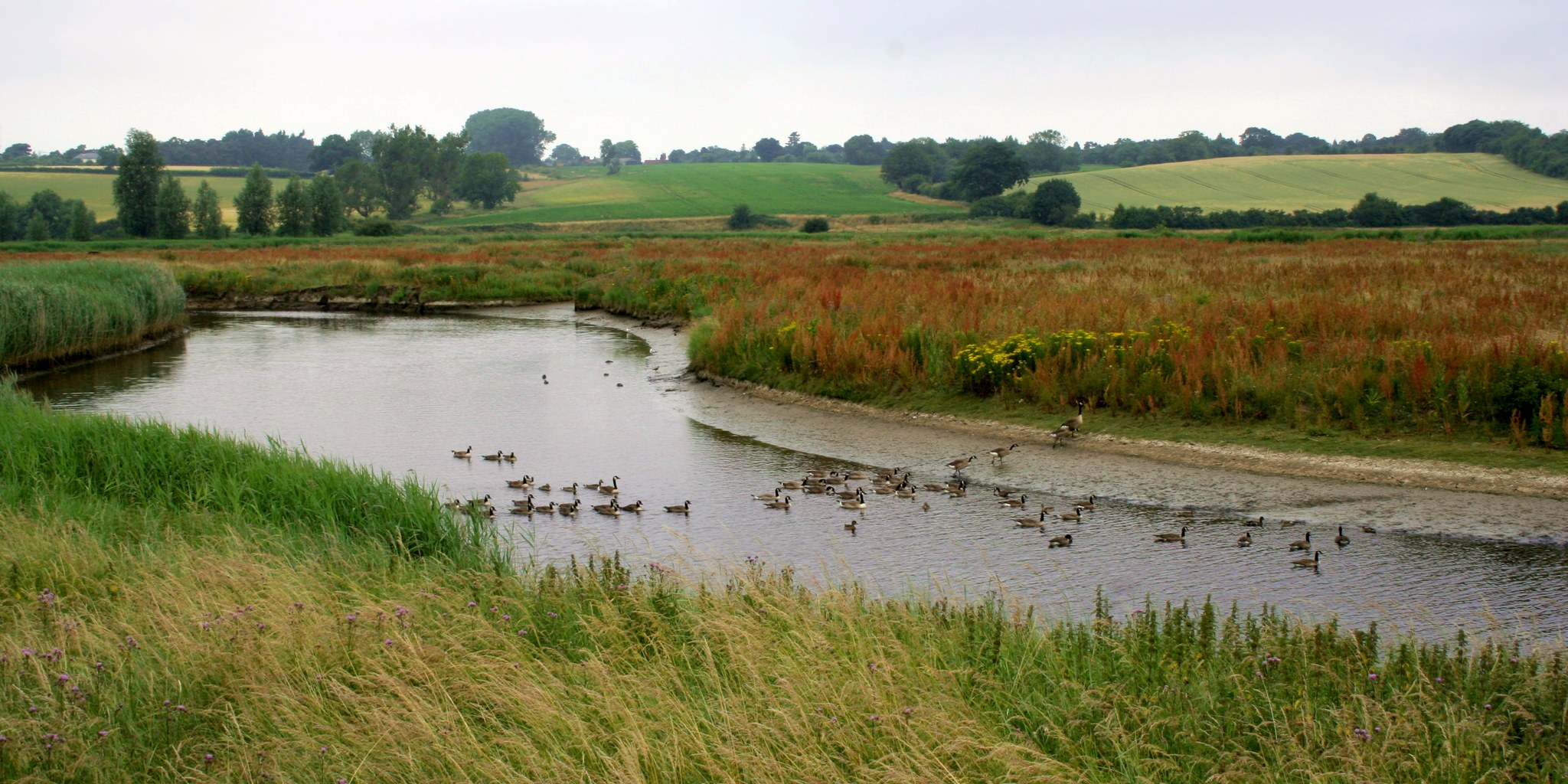
Wildfowl on River Stour

== Human influence ==
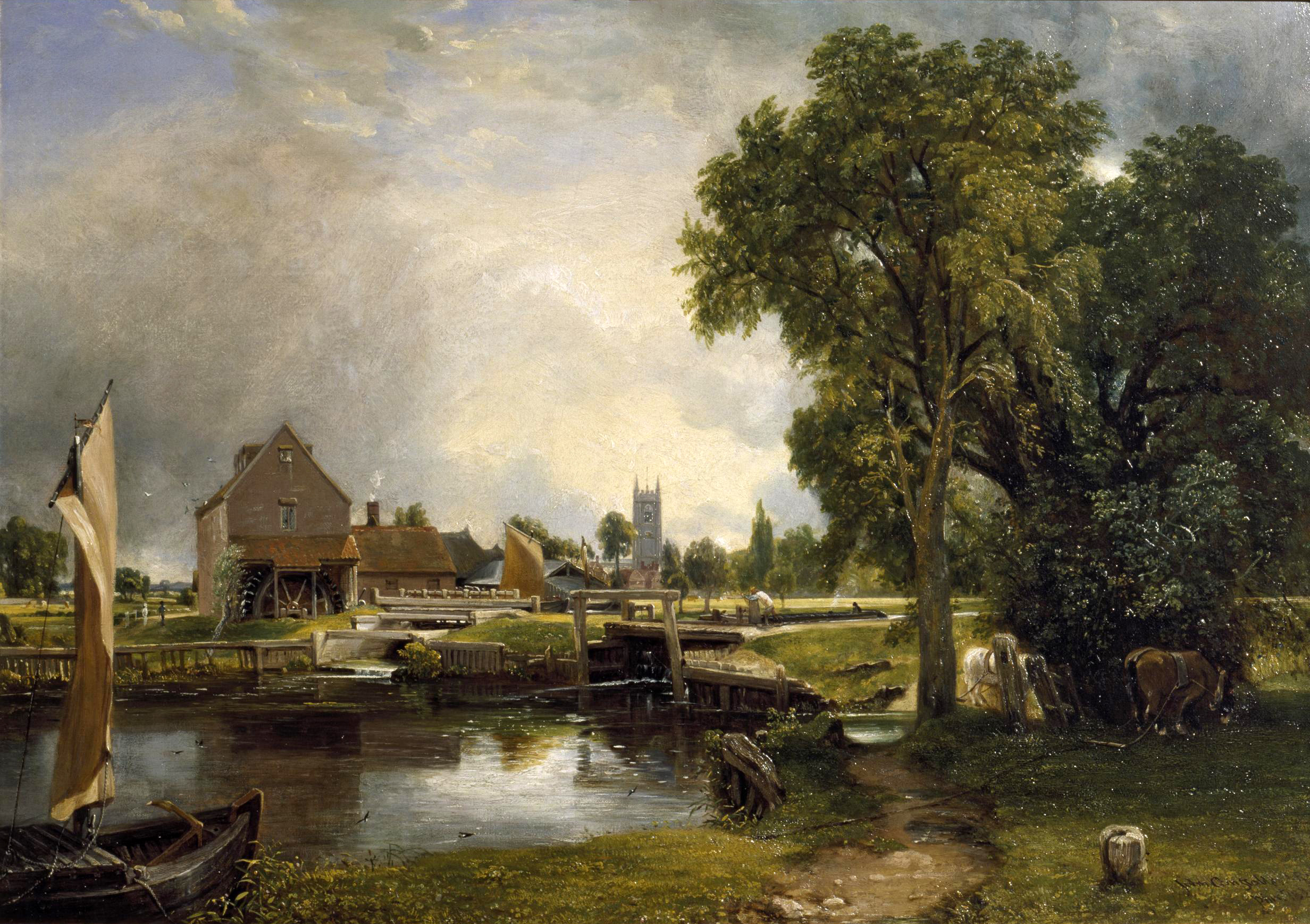
Dedham Lock and Mill by John Constable, 1820

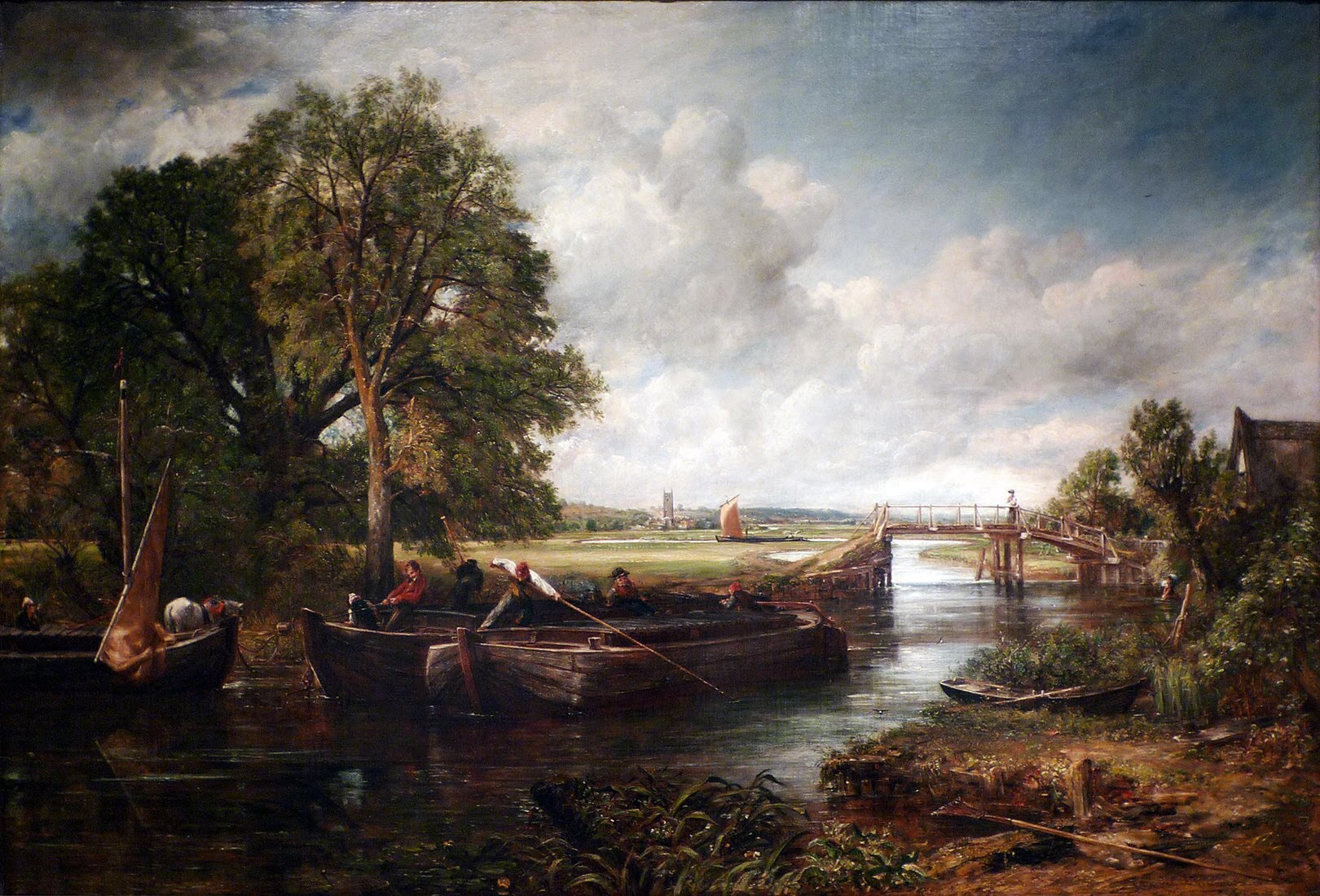
View on the Stour near Dedham by John Constable, 1822

Humans have had a great influence on the landscape including building isolated settlements, transport links and churches. Agricultural workers divided up the land to plant crops, grow timber and graze animals.

The landscape continues to change as changing agricultural practices, increased leisure time and an awareness of environmental concerns all contribute to development of the Stour valley.

In 1938 the Dedham Vale Society was founded with local architect Raymond Erith as its founding chairman.
