= Scottish National Gallery =

Part of National Galleries Scotland in Edinburgh

National Galleries Scotland: National

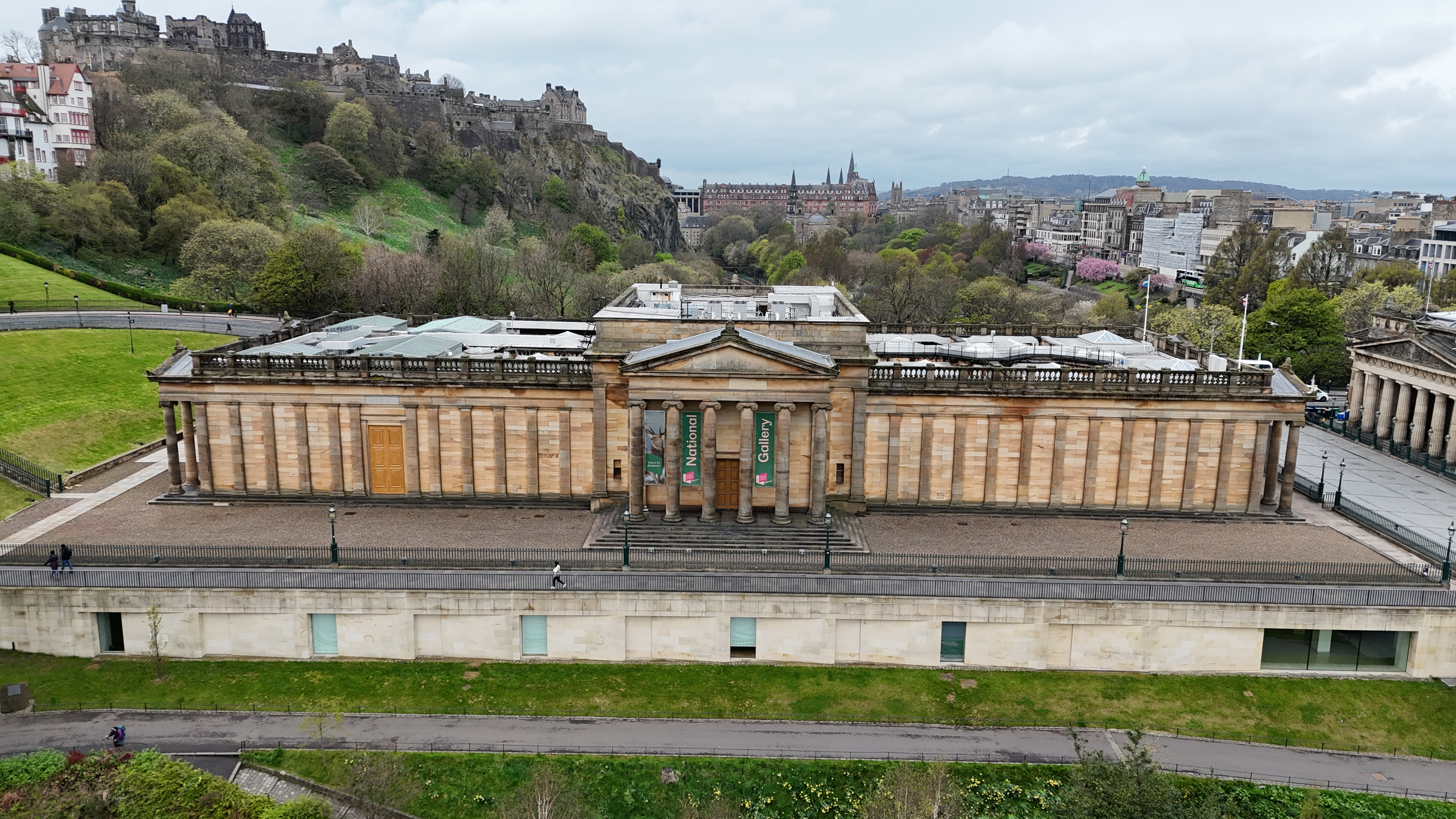
- Scottish National Gallery (2025)

- Location within Edinburgh city centre
- Former names: Scottish National Gallery, National Gallery of Scotland
- Established: 1859; 167 years ago
- Location: The Mound, Edinburgh
- Coordinates: 55°57′3″N 3°11′44″W
- Visitors: 1,583,231 (2019)
- Public transit access: Princes Street; Edinburgh Waverley
- Website: www.nationalgalleries.org

The National (formerly the Scottish National Gallery) is the national art gallery of Scotland. It is located on The Mound in central Edinburgh, close to Princes Street. The building was designed in a neoclassical style by William Henry Playfair, and first opened to the public in 1859.

The gallery houses Scotland's national collection of fine art, spanning Scottish and international art from the beginning of the Renaissance up to the start of the 20th century.

The National is run by National Galleries Scotland, a public body that also owns the Scottish National Gallery of Modern Art and the Scottish National Portrait Gallery. Because of its architectural similarity, the National is frequently confused by visitors with the neighbouring Royal Scottish Academy Building (RSA), a separate institution which works closely with the National.

== History ==
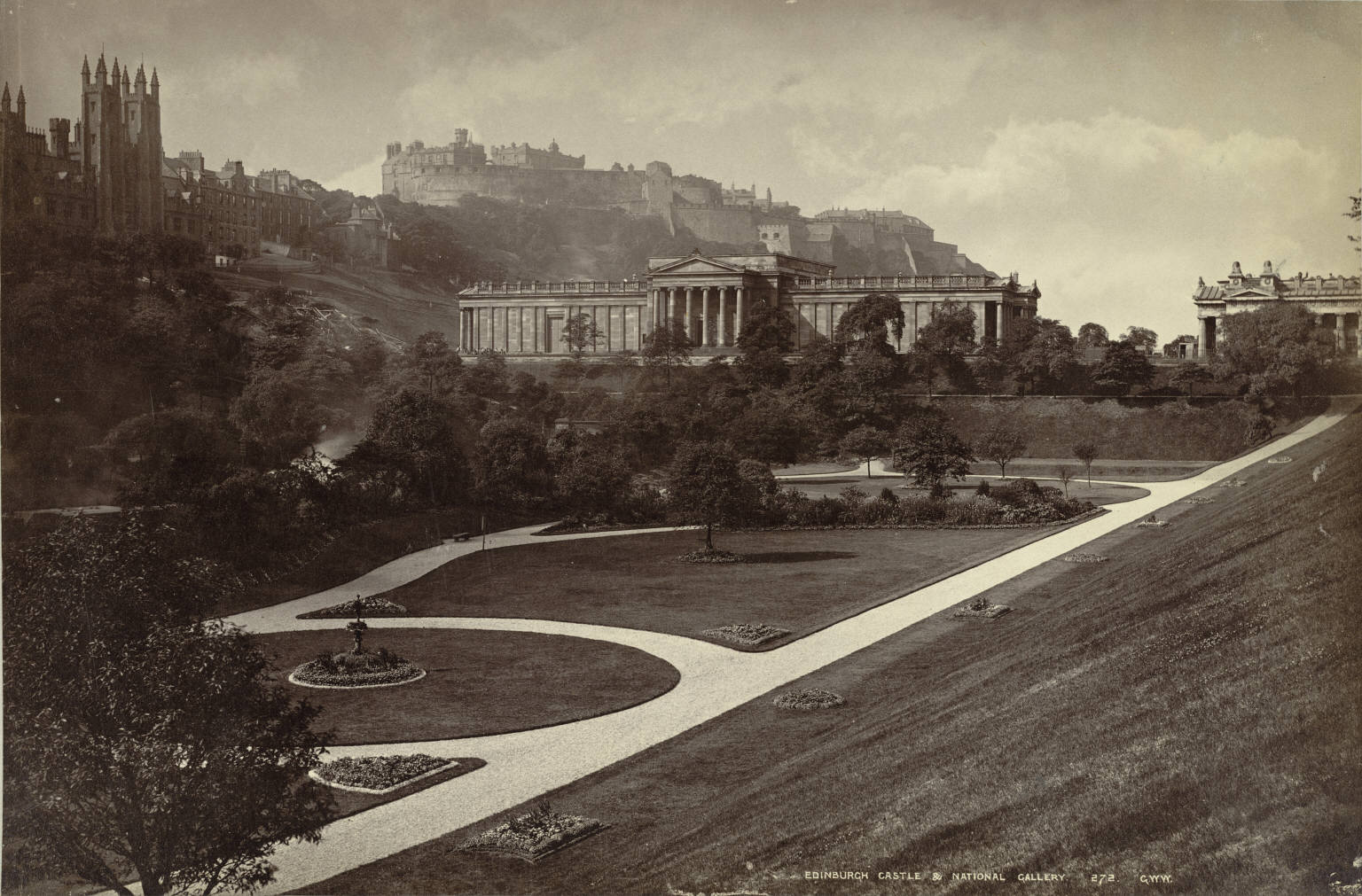
Edinburgh Castle and National Gallery (c. 1865)

The origins of Scotland's national collection lie with the Royal Institution for the Encouragement of the Fine Arts in Scotland, founded in 1819. It began to acquire paintings, and in 1828 the Royal Institution building opened on The Mound. In 1826, the Scottish Academy was founded by a group of artists who, dissatisfied with its policies, seceded from the Royal Institution, and in 1838 it became the Royal Scottish Academy (RSA). A key aim of the RSA was the founding of a national collection. It began to build up a collection and from 1835 rented exhibition space within the Royal Institution building.

In the 1840s, plans were put in place for a new building to house the RSA. The noted Scottish architect William Henry Playfair was commissioned to prepare designs, and on 30 August 1850, Prince Albert laid the foundation stone. The building was originally divided along the middle, with the east half housing the exhibition galleries of the RSA, and the western half containing the new National Gallery of Scotland, formed from the collection of the Royal Institution. In 1912 the RSA moved into the Royal Institution building, which remains known as the Royal Scottish Academy Building. When it re-opened, the gallery concentrated on building its permanent collection of Scottish and European art for the nation of Scotland.

In the early 21st century, the National Galleries launched the Playfair Project, a scheme to create a new basement entrance to the National Gallery in Princes Street Gardens and an underground connecting space, called the Weston Link, between the gallery and the renovated Royal Scottish Academy building. The new underground space opened in 2004.

In 2012, the gallery's umbrella organisation, National Galleries of Scotland, underwent a rebranding exercise, and National Gallery of Scotland was renamed the Scottish National Gallery.

In 2023, the organisation was rebranded once more, and adopted the shorter name National Galleries Scotland. Each of its galleries was also rebranded and the Scottish National Gallery is now billed as National Galleries Scotland: National.

== Building ==
William Playfair's building—like its neighbour, the Royal Scottish Academy—was designed in the form of an ancient Greek temple. While Playfair designed the RSA in the Doric order, the National Gallery building is in the Ionic order. The main east and west elevations have plain pilastrading with the higher central transverse block having hexastyle Ionic porticoes. Paired Ionic columns in antis are flanked by tetrastyle Ionic porticoes at north and south. The design reflects the building's original dual purpose being divided longitudinally with the exhibition galleries of the RSA to the east and the National Gallery to the west.

Playfair worked to a much more limited budget than the RSA project, and this is reflected in his comparatively austere architectural style. He may have drawn inspiration from an 1829 scheme for an arcade of shops by Archibald Elliot II, son of Archibald Elliot. Playfair's National Gallery was laid out in a cruciform plan; he originally planned to build towers at the corners of the transverse central block, but these were abandoned during the project. When the RSA moved into the former Royal Institution building in 1912, the Office of Works Architect for Scotland, William Thomas Oldrieve remodelled the NGS interior to house the National Gallery collection exclusively.

In the 1970s, when the gallery was under the direction of the Department of the Environment, the internal accommodation was extended. An upper floor was added at the south end in 1972, creating five new small galleries, and in 1978 a new gallery was opened in the basement to house the Gallery's Scottish Collection.

The new Princes Street Gardens entrance and underground space opened in 2004 was designed by John Miller and Partners. Construction took five years and cost £32 million. The area contains a lecture theatre, education area, shop, restaurant, an interactive gallery, and a link to the RSA building.

In January 2019, construction work began on a project to alter the lower level areas and to create extended exhibition space. It is planned that the Princes Street Gardens entrance will become the main entrance of the gallery; to facilitate access, East Princes Street Gardens is being re-landscaped with sloping paths and 52 trees have been felled, to be replaced with 22 newly planted saplings. The redevelopment is delayed until at least late 2022, as a result of asbestos being found in part of the structure and due to the implications of the COVID-19 pandemic.

Architectural features

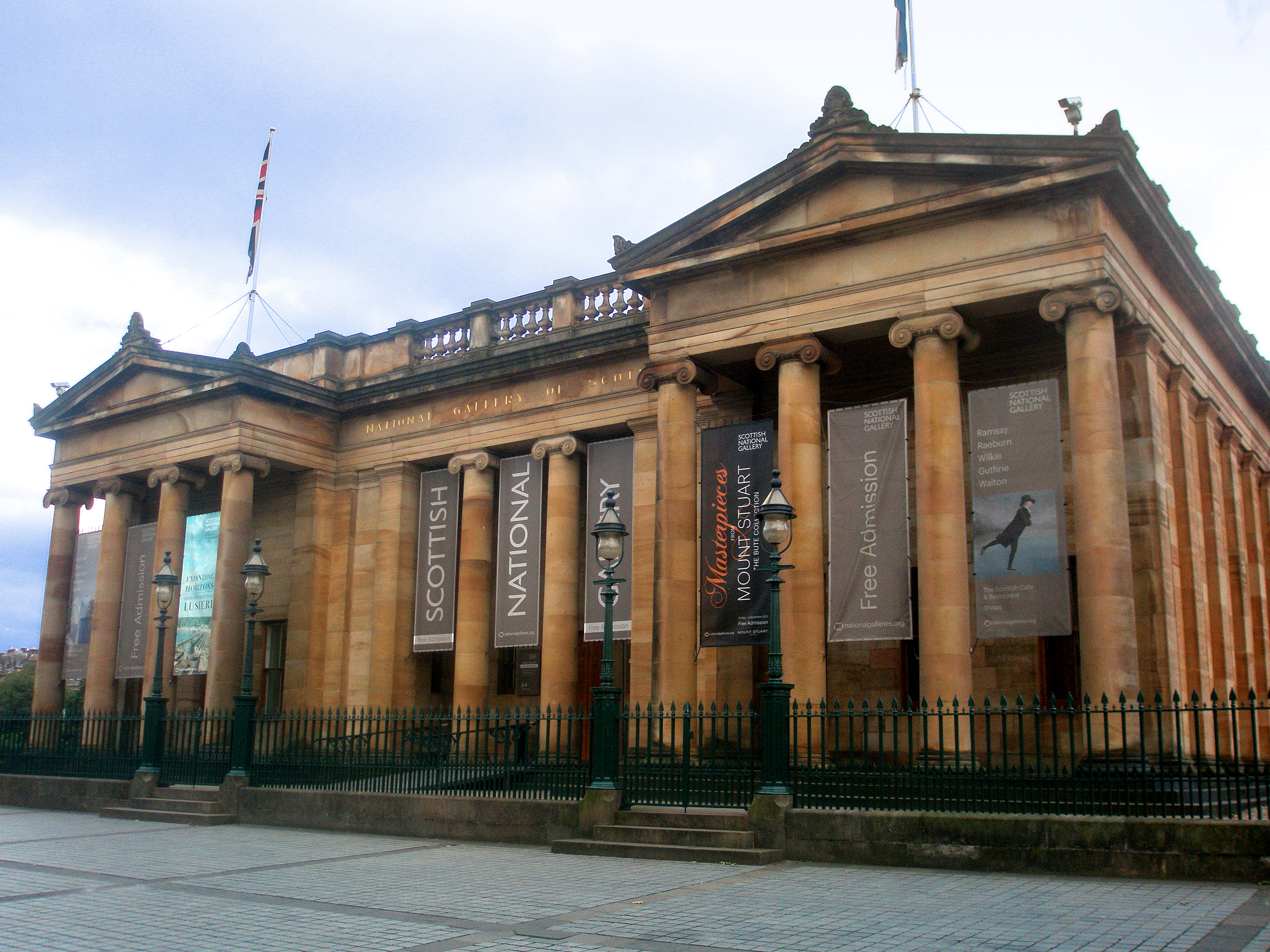
Twin porticoes at the main entrance with the original name inscribed on the frieze.

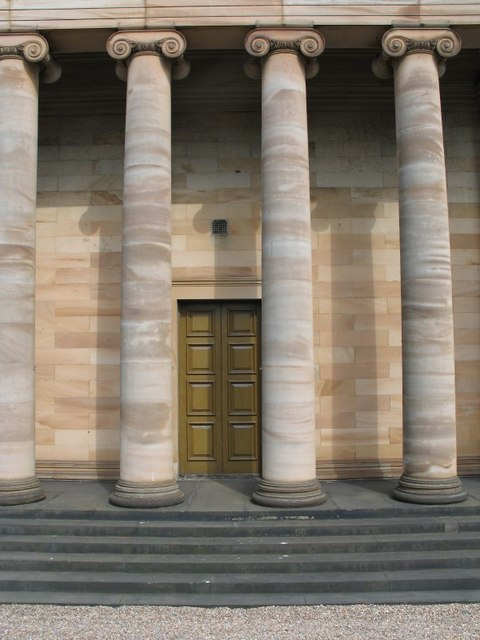
Playfair's ionic columns

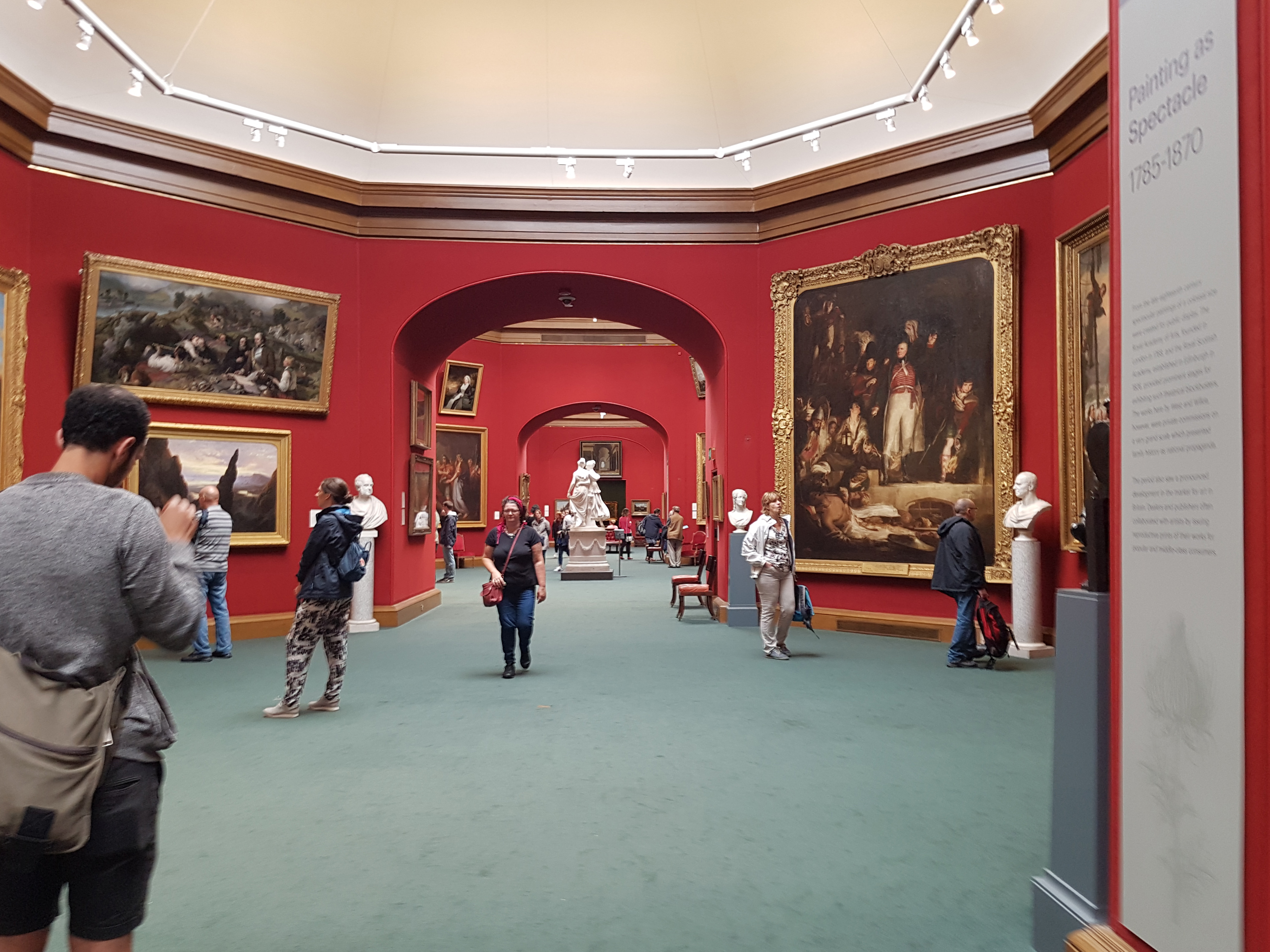
Interior of the ground floor main galleries

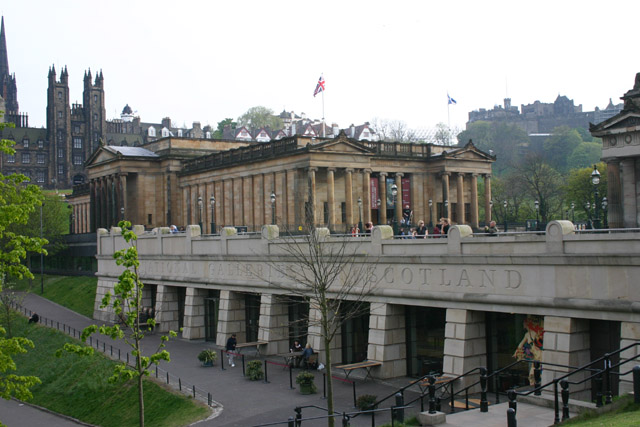
The Princes Street Gardens entrance (opened 2004)

== Research ==
The research facilities at the Scottish National Gallery include the Prints and Drawings Collection of over 30,000 works on paper, from the early Renaissance to the late nineteenth century; and the reference-only Research Library. The Research Library covers the period from 1300 to 1900 and holds approximately 50,000 volumes of books, journals, slides, and microfiches, as well as some archival material relating to the collections, exhibitions and history of the National Gallery. The Print Room or Research Library can be accessed by appointment.

== Collection ==
At the heart of the National Gallery's collection is a group of paintings transferred from the Royal Scottish Academy. This includes masterpieces by Jacopo Bassano, Van Dyck and Giambattista Tiepolo. The National Gallery did not receive its own purchase grant until 1903.

In the Gallery's main ground floor rooms are displayed a number of major large-scale canvases such as Benjamin West's Alexander III of Scotland Rescued from the Fury of a Stag (1786), Rubens's The Feast of Herod (1633 or c.1637-38) and a pair of paintings by Titian, Diana and Actaeon and Diana and Callisto (purchased jointly with the National Gallery, London). The Scottish National Gallery has also jointly acquired one of Canova's sculptures of The Three Graces with the Victoria and Albert Museum.

The Scottish National Gallery has a notable collection of works by Scottish artists, including several landscapes by Alexander Nasmyth, and several works by Sir Henry Raeburn — of particular note his portraits of Alexander Ranaldson Macdonell and Sir Walter Scott), and his celebrated painting, The Skating Minister. There are also a number of works by artists of the Glasgow School such as James Guthrie. The Gallery also holds a collection of works by English painters, such as Constable's The Vale of Dedham and a sizeable collection of water colours by Turner which are traditionally displayed in January. The Monarch of the Glen, a painting considered to depict the grandeur of the wildlife and scenery of the Scottish Highlands, is also held in the gallery, the work of the English painter Sir Edwin Landseer.

Much of this institutional collecting is allied to a high degree of financial acuity whereby maximum advantage is taken of favourable tax conditions for works of art offered for sale.

=== Notable works ===
Key works of art displayed at the National Gallery include:

- Gian Lorenzo Bernini, Carlo Antonio dal Pozzo and Design for a Papal Monument
- Sandro Botticelli, Virgin Adoring the Sleeping Christ Child
- Frans Hals, Portrait of Pieter Verdonck
- Antonio Canova, The Three Graces (displayed on rotation with the Victoria and Albert Museum in London)
- Paul Cézanne, The Big Trees and Montagne Sainte-Victoire
- Jean Siméon Chardin, Vase of Flowers
- John Constable, The Vale of Dedham SNG
- Gerard David, Three Legends of St Nicholas
- Edgar Degas, Portrait of Diego Martelli
- James Drummond, The Porteous Mob and A Lady Descending from a Sedan Chair. Study for the Painting The Porteous Mob
- Anthony van Dyck, The Lomellini Family
- Thomas Gainsborough, Portrait of Mrs Mary Graham
- Paul Gauguin, Vision after the Sermon
- Hugo van der Goes, The Trinity Altarpiece (on loan from the Royal Collection)
- Vincent van Gogh, Olive Trees
- Francisco de Goya, El Medico
- El Greco, Saint Jerome in Penitence, Fábula and Christ Blessing (The Saviour of the World)
- Gavin Hamilton, Dawkins and Wood Discovering the Ruins of Palmyra
- Jean-Auguste-Dominique Ingres, Mlle Albertine Hayard
- Edwin Landseer, The Monarch of the Glen
- Lorenzo Lotto, Madonna and Child with Saints
- Claude Monet, Haystacks
- Joseph Noel Paton, The Quarrel of Oberon and Titania
- Giambattista Pittoni, St Jerome and Peter of Alcantara
- Nicolas Poussin, The Seven Sacraments
- Sir Henry Raeburn, The Reverend Robert Walker Skating on Duddingston Loch
- Allan Ramsay, Margaret Lindsay
- Raphael, The Bridgewater Madonna
- Rembrandt van Rijn, A Woman in Bed and Self-Portrait
- Sir Joshua Reynolds, The Ladies Waldegrave
- Pieter Jansz Saenredam, Interior of St Bavo's Church in Haarlem
- Georges Seurat, La Luzerne, St-Denis
- John Singer Sargent, Lady Agnew of Lochnaw
- Titian, Venus Anadyomene, Diana and Callisto, Diana and Actaeon, Virgin and Child with Saint John the Baptist and an Unidentified Saint, and The Three Ages of Man
- Joseph Mallord William Turner, Somer Hill, Tonbridge and the Vaughan Bequest of 38 works
- Diego Velázquez, Old Woman Frying Eggs
- Johannes Vermeer, Christ in the House of Martha and Mary
- Antoine Watteau, Fêtes Vénitiennes
Notable artworks in the Scottish National Gallery collection

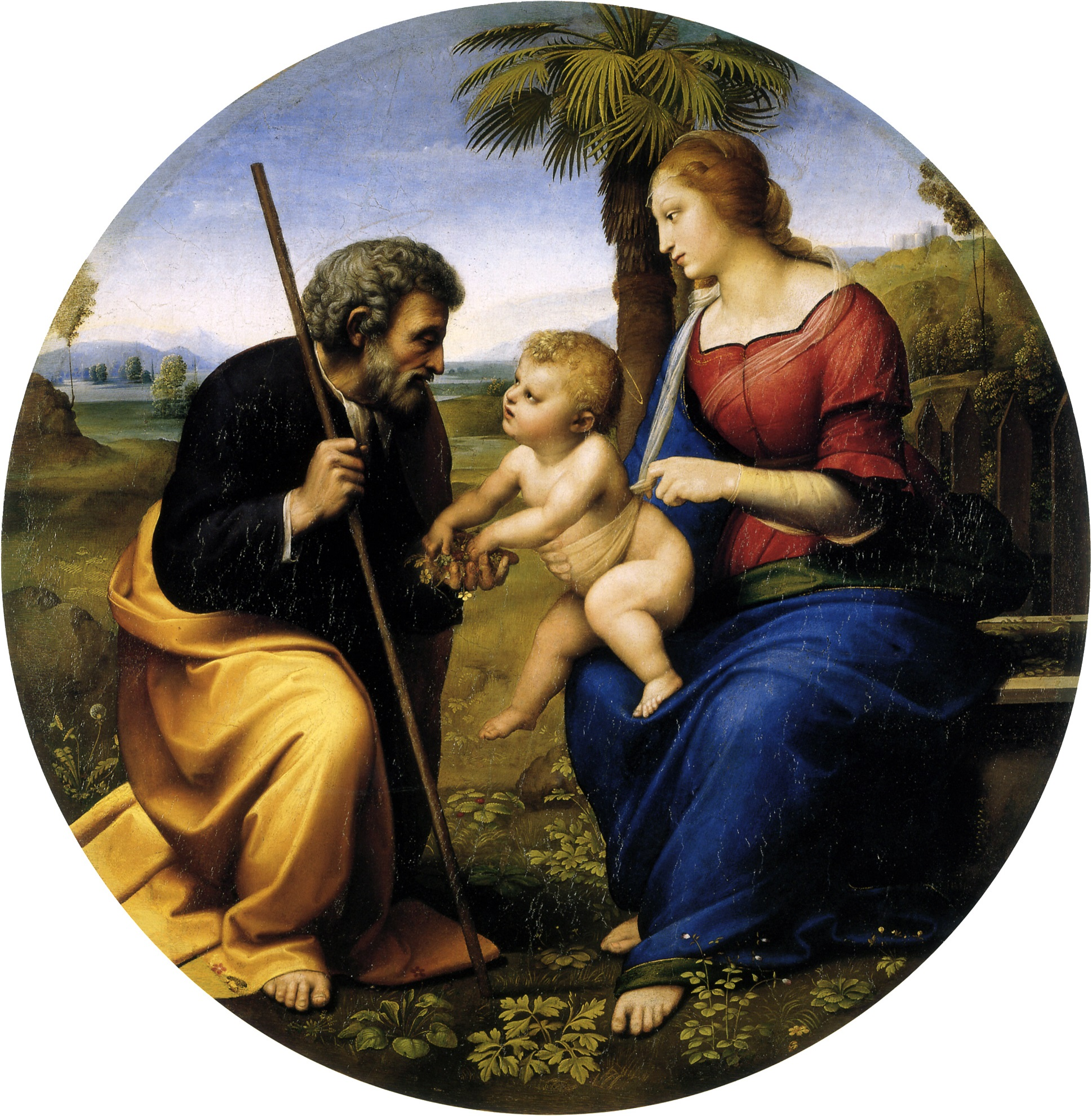
Holy Family with a Palm Tree
(Raphael, 1506)

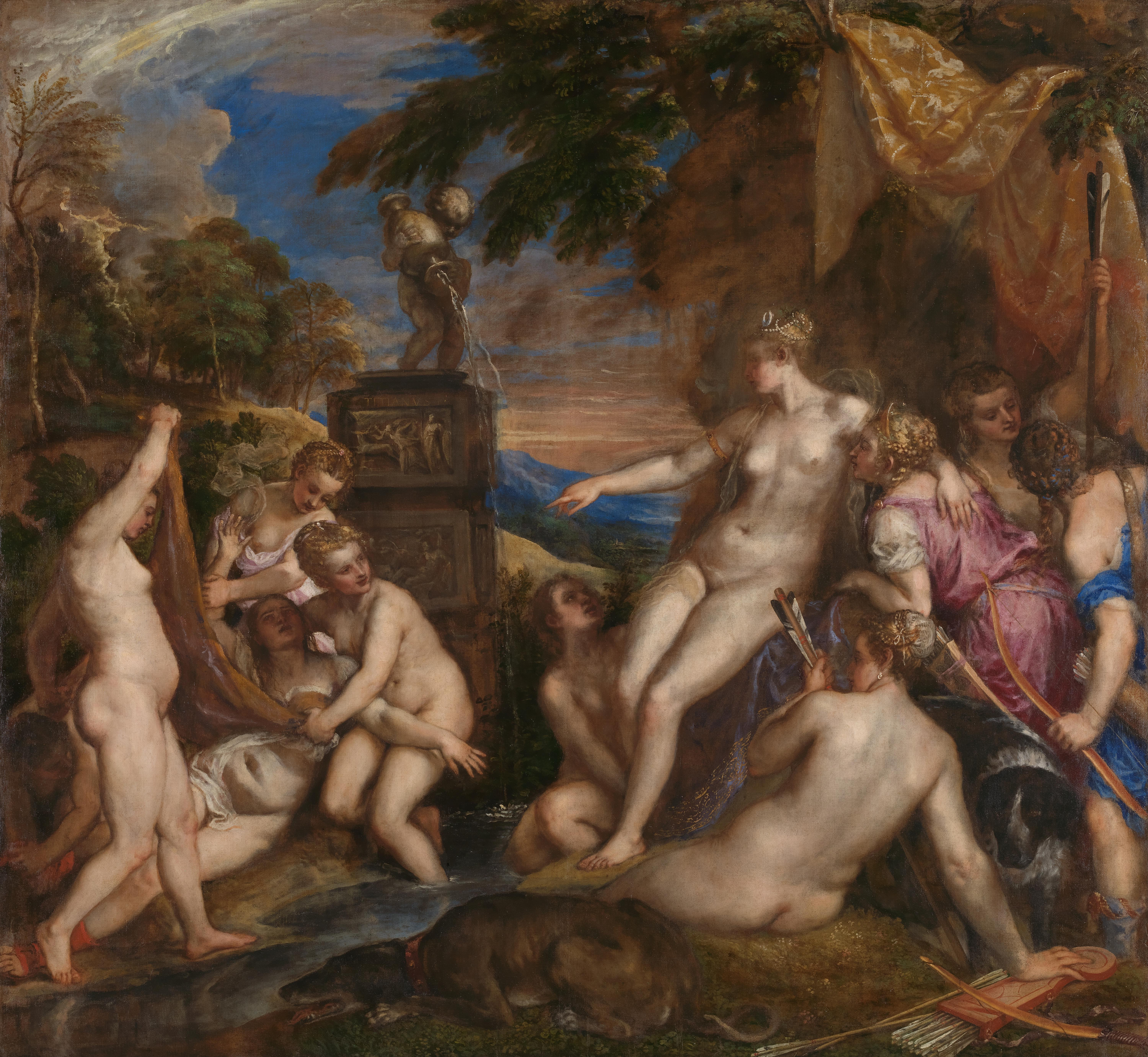
Diana and Callisto
(Titian, 1559)

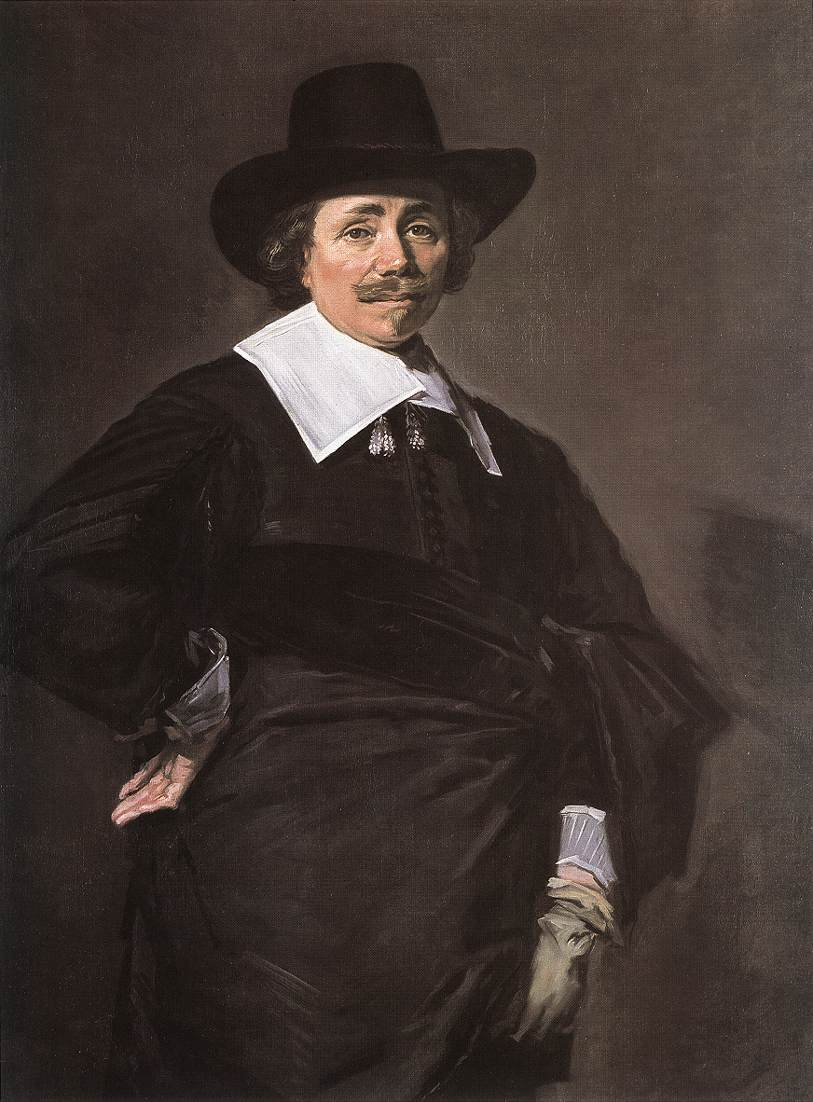
Portrait of François Wouters
(Frans Hals, about 1644)

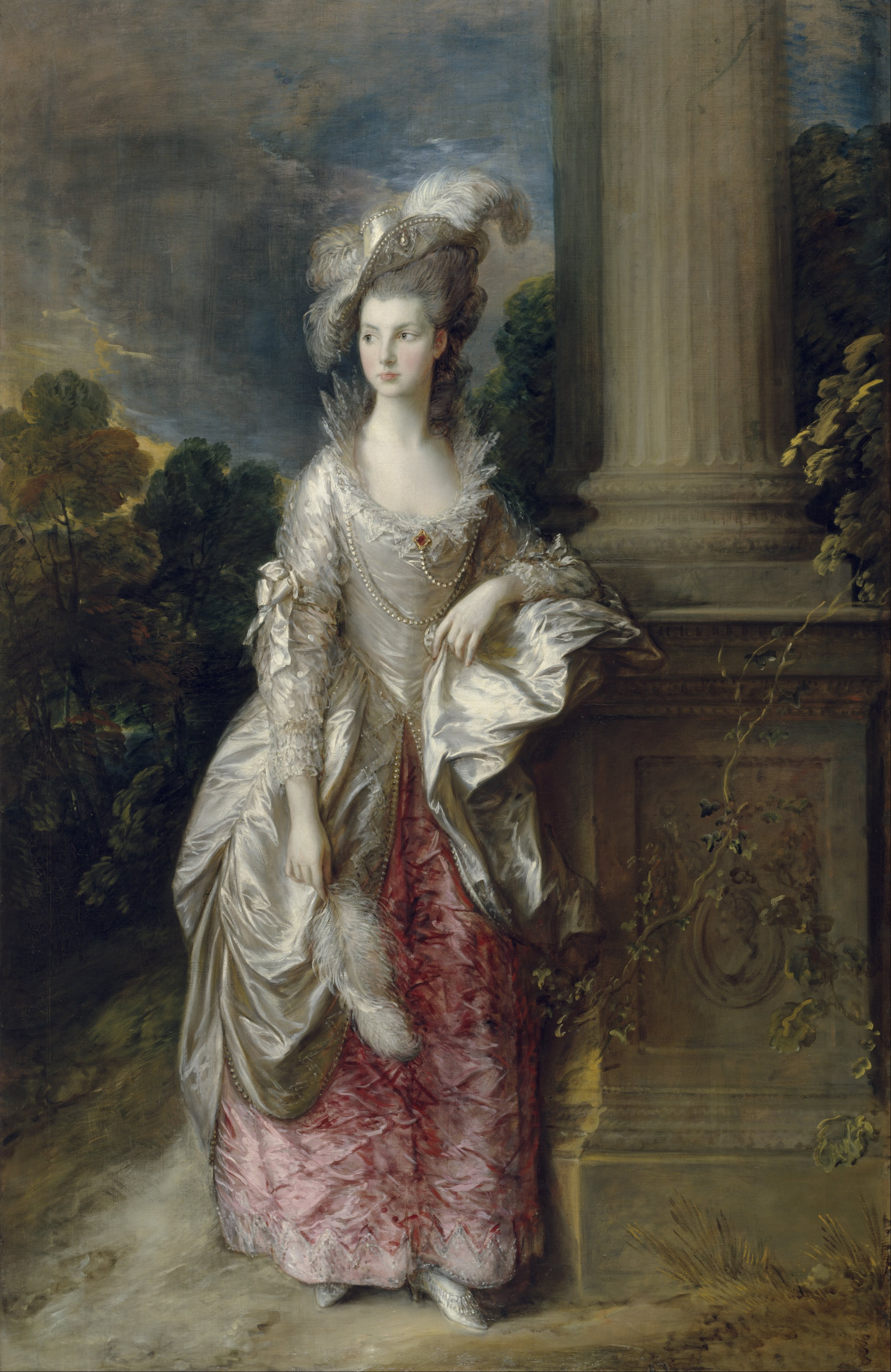
Portrait of Mrs Mary Graham
(Thomas Gainsborough, 1775)

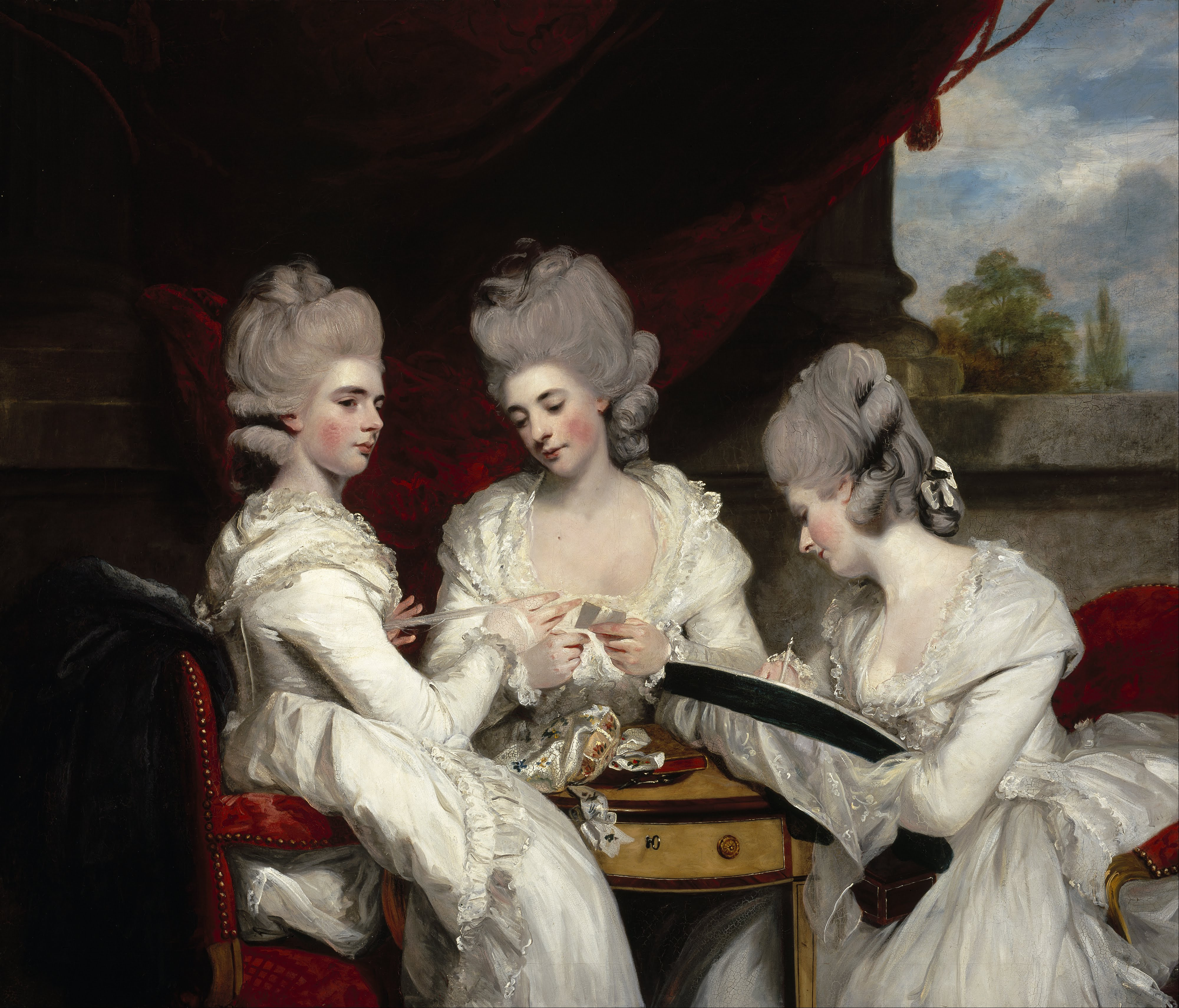
The Ladies Waldegrave
(Joshua Reynolds, 1780)

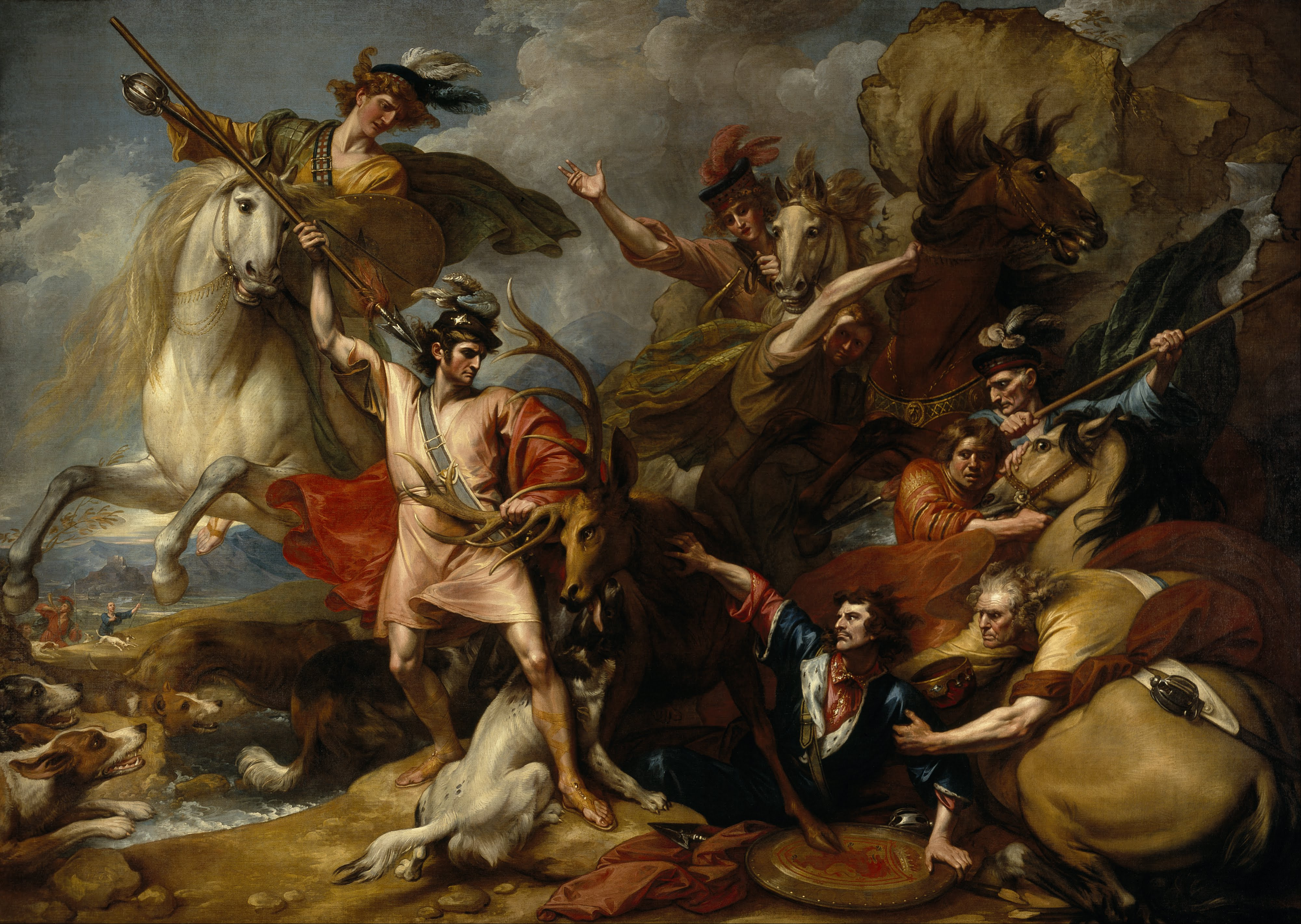
Alexander III of Scotland Rescued from the Fury of a Stag
(Benjamin West, 1786)

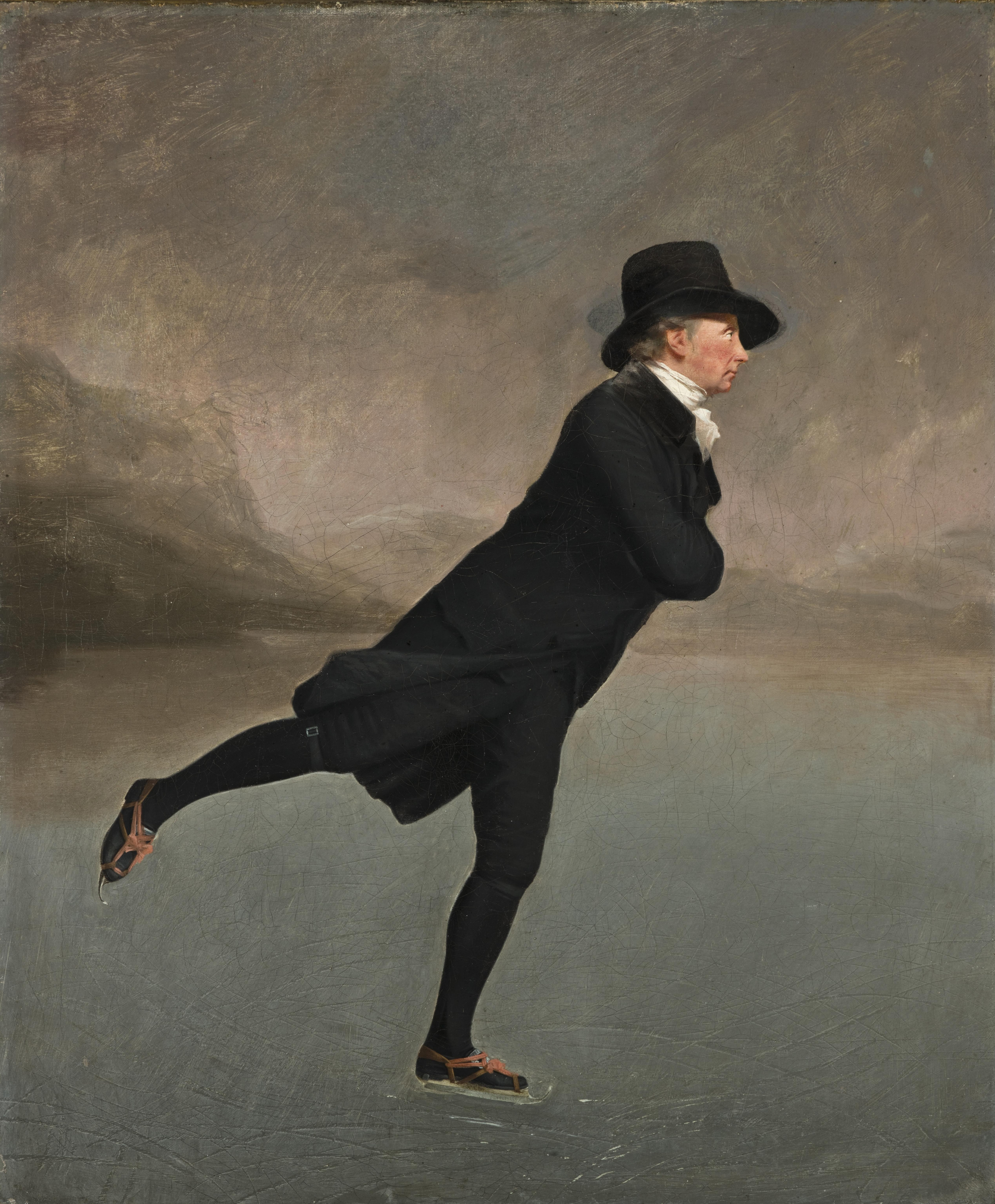
The Rev Robert Walker Skating on Duddingston Loch
(Sir Henry Raeburn, 1790s)

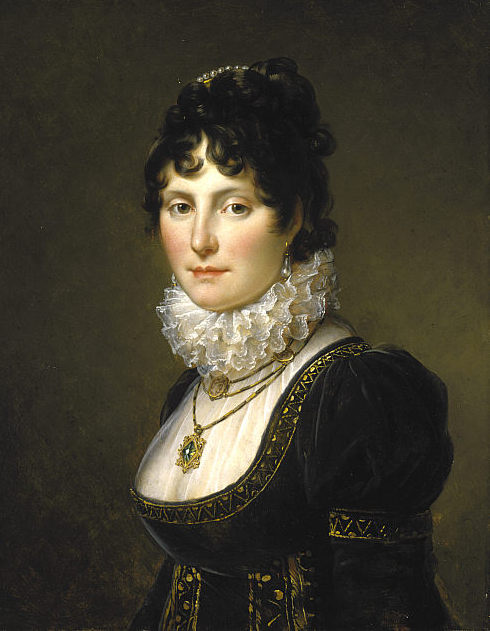
Portrait of Mary Nisbet
(François Gérard, 1803)

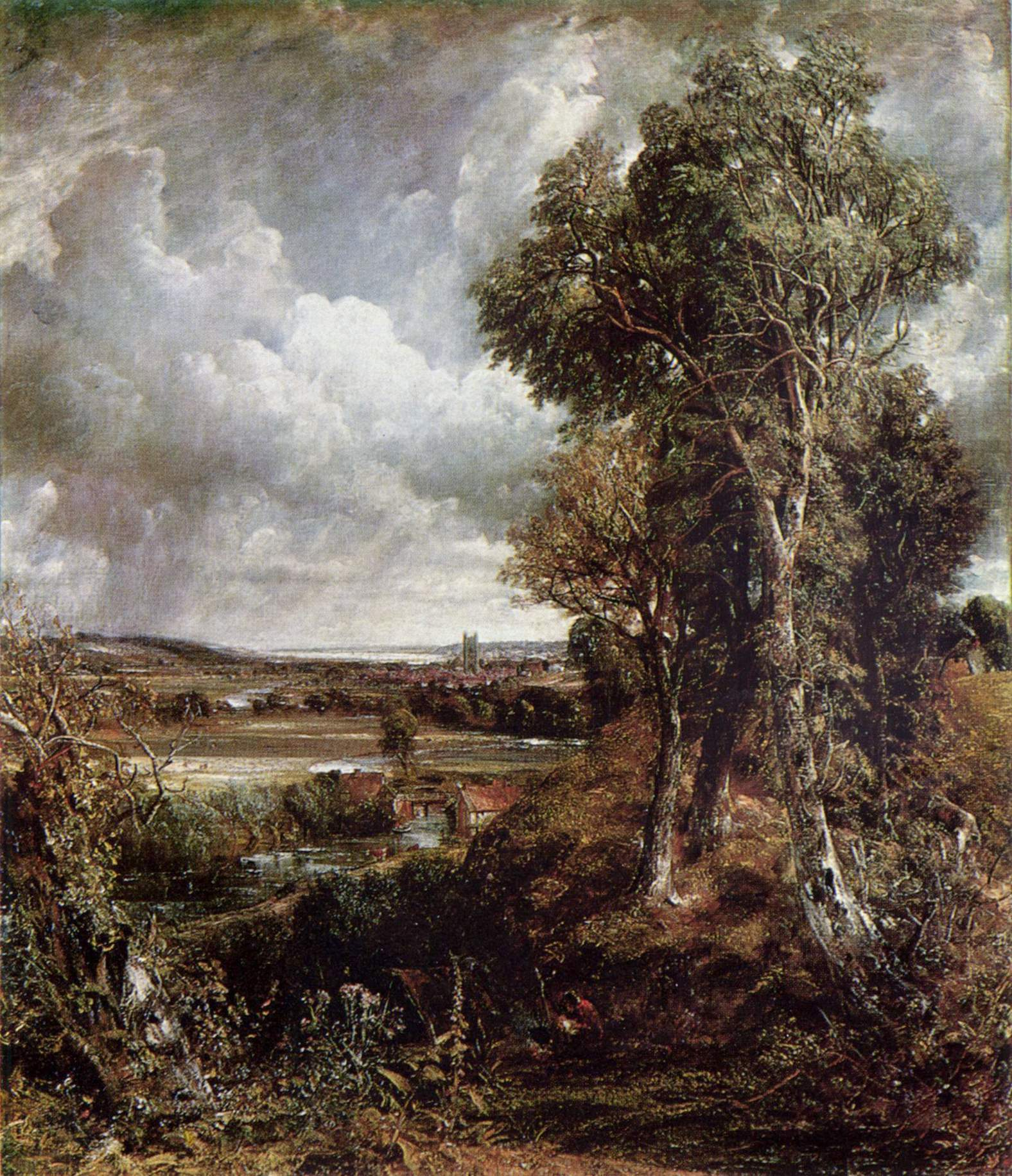
The Vale of Dedham
(John Constable, 1828)

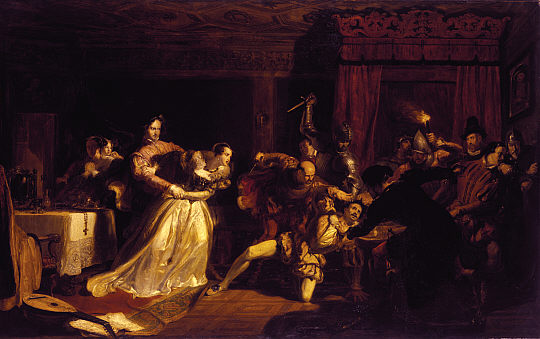
The Murder of David Rizzio
William Allan (1833)

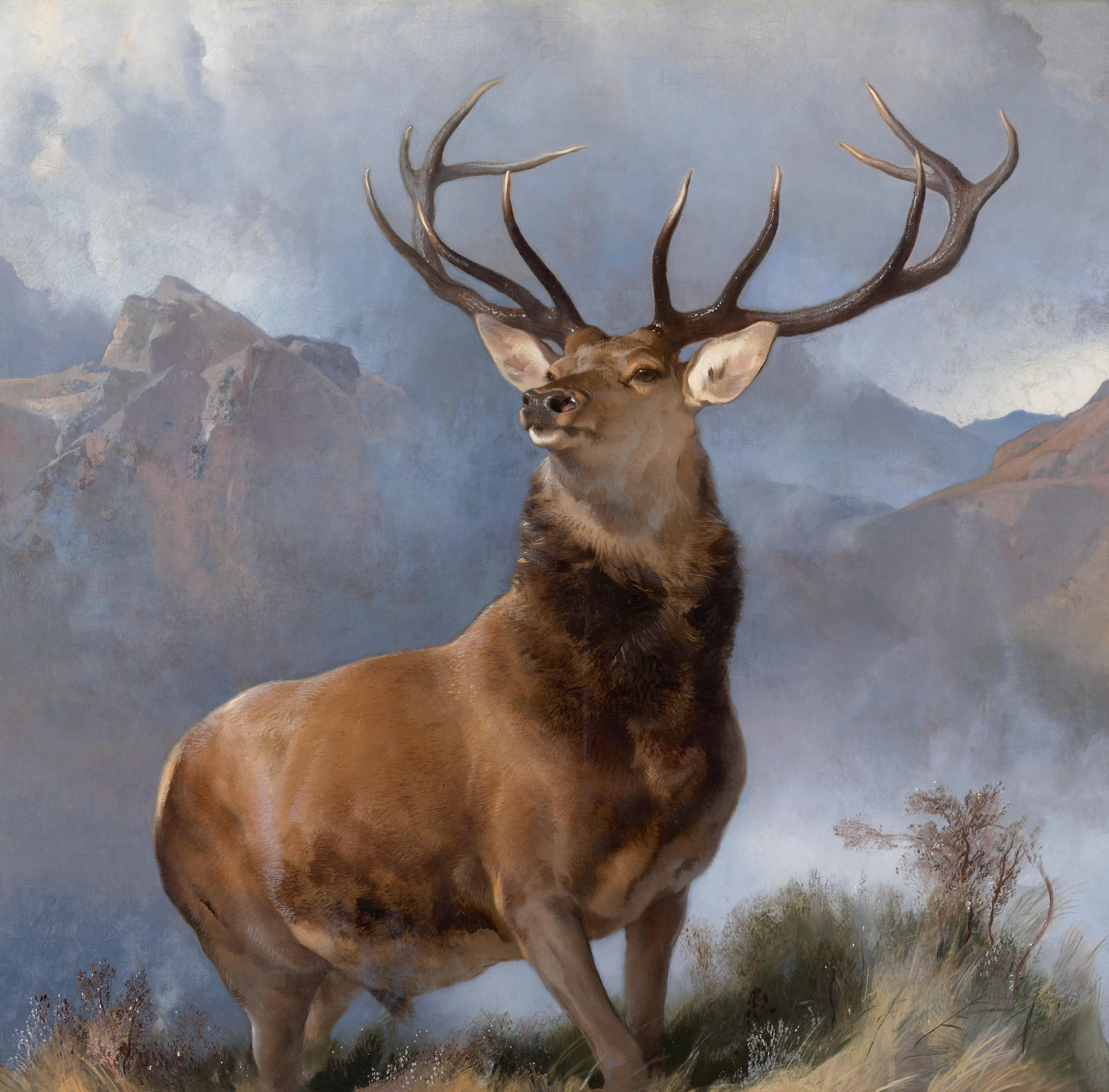
The Monarch of the Glen
(Edwin Landseer, 1851)

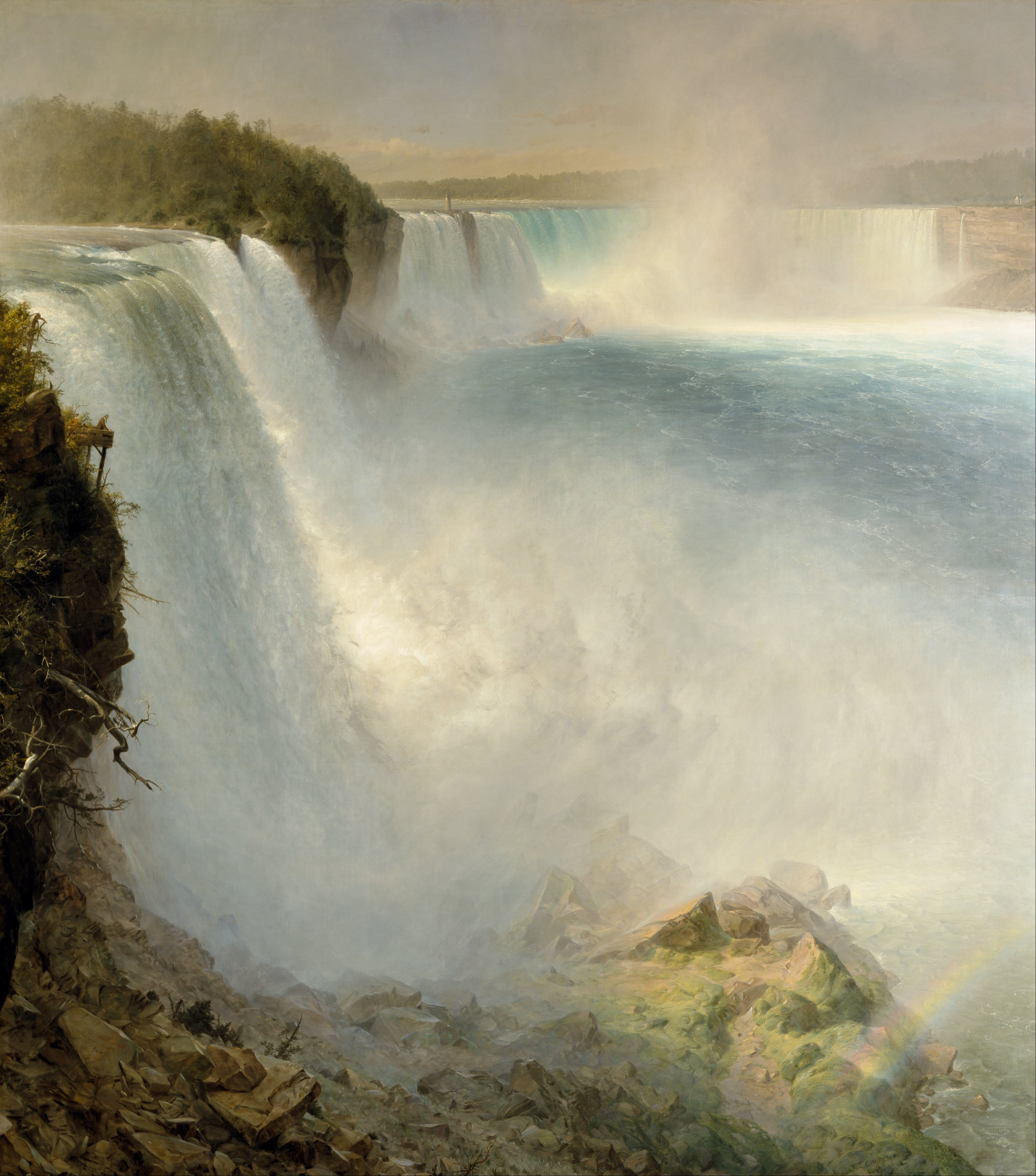
Niagara Falls, from the American Side
(Frederic Edwin Church, 1867)

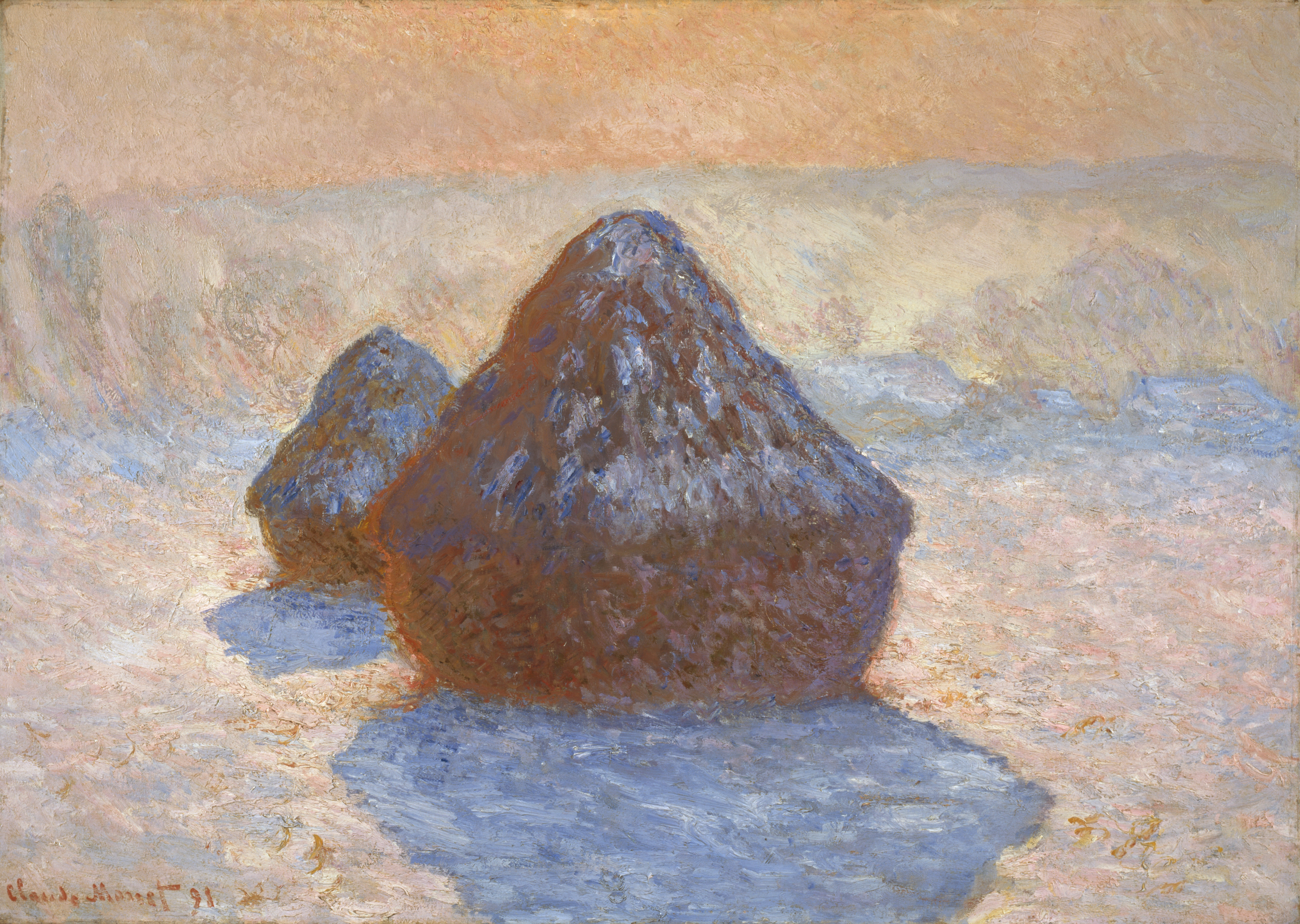
Haystacks, Snow Effect
(Claude Monet, 1891)

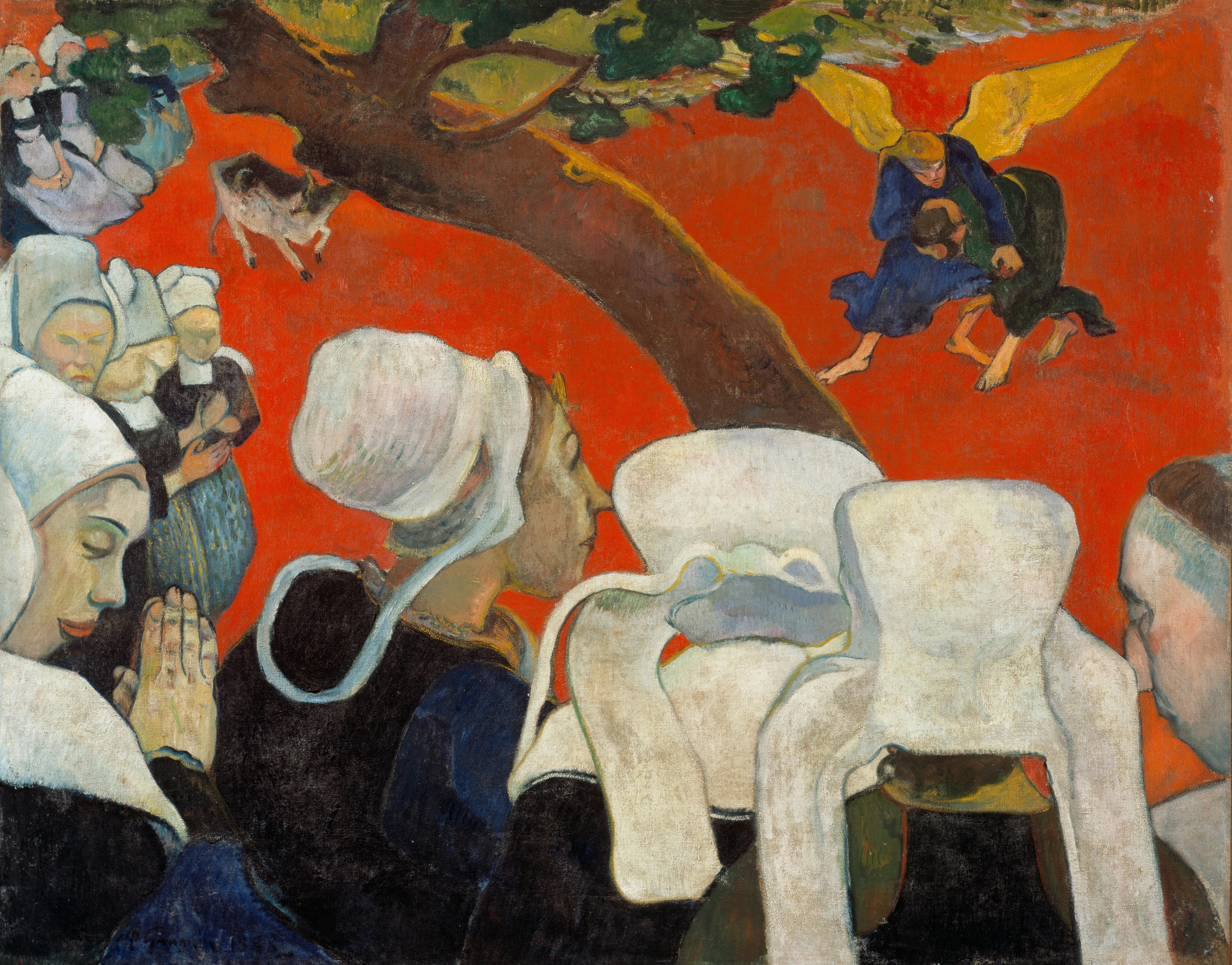
Vision après le Sermon
(Paul Gauguin, 1888)

Other artists represented in the collection include:

- David Allan
- Francis Bacon
- Federico Barocci
- William Blake
- Eugène Boudin
- David Young Cameron
- Gustave Courbet
- Aelbert Cuyp
- Eugène Delacroix
- Domenichino
- Albrecht Dürer
- William Dyce
- Adam Elsheimer
- John Emms
- Andrew Geddes
- Guercino
- James Guthrie
- Frans Hals
- Meindert Hobbema
- Hans Holbein the Younger
- Edward Atkinson Hornel
- Robert Scott Lauder
- Horatio McCulloch
- William York Macgregor
- William MacTaggart
- Lorenzo Monaco
- Berthe Morisot
- John Phillip
- Giovanni Battista Piranesi
- Camille Pissarro
- Robert Priseman
- David Roberts
- Peter Paul Rubens
- George Sanders
- William Strang
- Tintoretto
- Leonardo da Vinci
- Sir David Wilkie
- Francisco de Zurbarán

== See also ==
- National Galleries of Scotland
- List of national galleries
