= Koori Station =

Railway station in Koori, Fukushima Prefecture, Japan

Koori Station 桑折駅
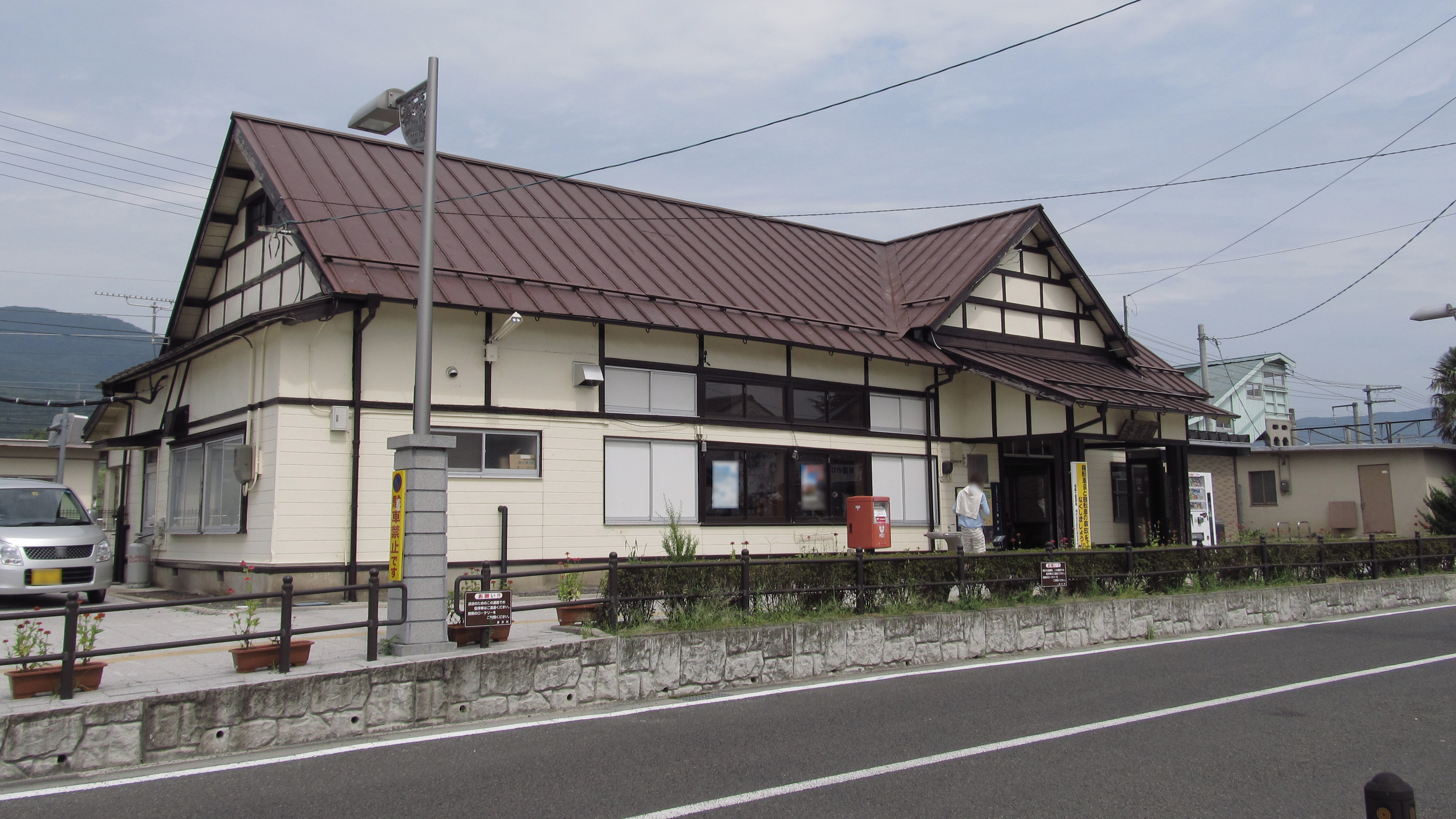
- Koori Station in August 2014

General information
- Location: Minamihanda Rokkaku, Koori-machi, Date-gun, Fukushima-ken969-1641; Japan
- Coordinates: 37°51′19.00″N 140°31′3.09″E
- Operator: JR East
- Line: ■ Tōhoku Main Line
- Distance: 285.9 km from Tokyo
- Platforms: 1 island + 1 side platforms
- Tracks: 2

Other information
- Status: Staffed
- Website: Official website

History
- Opened: December 15, 1887

Passengers
- FY2018: 631(daily)

Services
Preceding station	JR East	Following station
Date towards Fukushima	Tōhoku Main Line Rapid City Rabbit	Fujita towards Sendai
Date towards Kuroiso	Tōhoku Main Line Local	Fujita towards Morioka
Location
- Location within Fukushima Prefecture Location within Japan

Koori Station (桑折駅, Koori-eki) is a railway station in the town of Koori, Fukushima, Japan operated by East Japan Railway Company (JR East).

== Lines ==
Koori Station is served by the Tōhoku Main Line, and is located 285.9 rail kilometers from the official starting point of the line at Tokyo Station.

== Station layout ==
The station has one side platform and one island platform connected to the station building by a footbridge, but only the side platform and one side of the island platform is in use. The station is staffed.

=== Platforms ===
1	■ Tōhoku Main Line	for Fukushima Kuroiso
2	■ Tōhoku Main Line	for Iwanuma and Sendai

== History ==
Koori Station opened on December 15, 1887. The station was absorbed into the JR East network upon the privatization of the Japanese National Railways (JNR) on April 1, 1987.

== Passenger statistics ==
In fiscal 2018, the station was used by an average of 631 passengers daily (boarding passengers only).

Passenger Change
Year	Daily Average Number of Passengers
2000	777
2001	789
2002	801
2003	765
2004	757
2005	752
2006	733
2007	710
2008	681
2009	675
2010	652
2011	643
2012	657
2013	695

== Surrounding area ==
- Koori Post Office
- Koori town hall
- National Route 4

== See also ==
- List of railway stations in Japan
