= Kaida Station =

Railway station in Kunimi, Fukushima Prefecture, Japan

Kaida Station 貝田駅
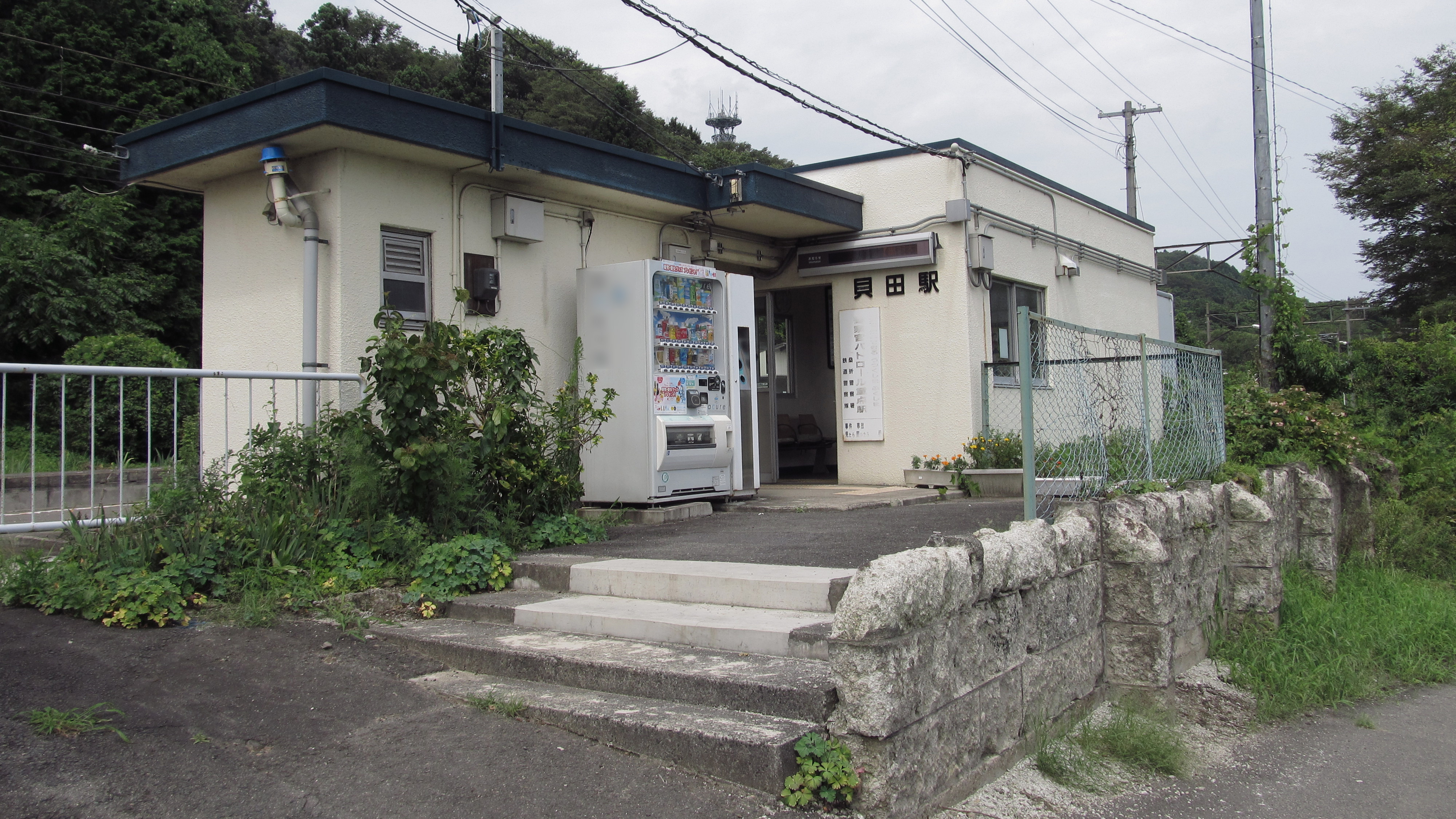
- Kaida Station in August 2014

General information
- Location: Kaida Takenone 1, Kunimi-machi, Date-gun Fukushima-ken 969-1711; Japan
- Coordinates: 37°54′29.19″N 140°34′51.66″E
- Operator: JR East
- Line: ■ Tōhoku Main Line
- Distance: 294.9 km from Tokyo
- Platforms: 2 side platforms
- Tracks: 2

Other information
- Status: Unstaffed
- Website: Official website

History
- Opened: June 10, 1952

Passengers

Services
Preceding station	JR East	Following station
Fujita towards Kuroiso	Tōhoku Main Line Local	Kosugō towards Morioka
Location
- Location within Fukushima Prefecture Location within Japan

Kaida Station (貝田駅, Kaida-eki) is a railway station in the town of Kunimi, Fukushima, Japan operated by East Japan Railway Company (JR East).

== Lines ==
Kaida Station is served by the Tōhoku Main Line, and is located 294.9 rail kilometers from the official starting point of the line at Tokyo Station.

== Station layout ==
The station has two opposed side platforms connected to the station building by a footbridge. The station is unattended.

=== Platforms ===
1	■ Tōhoku Main Line	for Fukushima
2	■ Tōhoku Main Line	for Shiroishi

== History ==
Kaida Station opened on June 10, 1952, although a signal stop had existed at this location since June 5, 1922. The station was absorbed into the JR East network upon the privatization of the Japanese National Railways (JNR) on April 1, 1987.

== Surrounding area ==
- National Route 4

== See also ==
- List of railway stations in Japan
