= Fujita Station =

Railway station in Kunimi, Fukushima Prefecture, Japan

Fujita Station 藤田駅
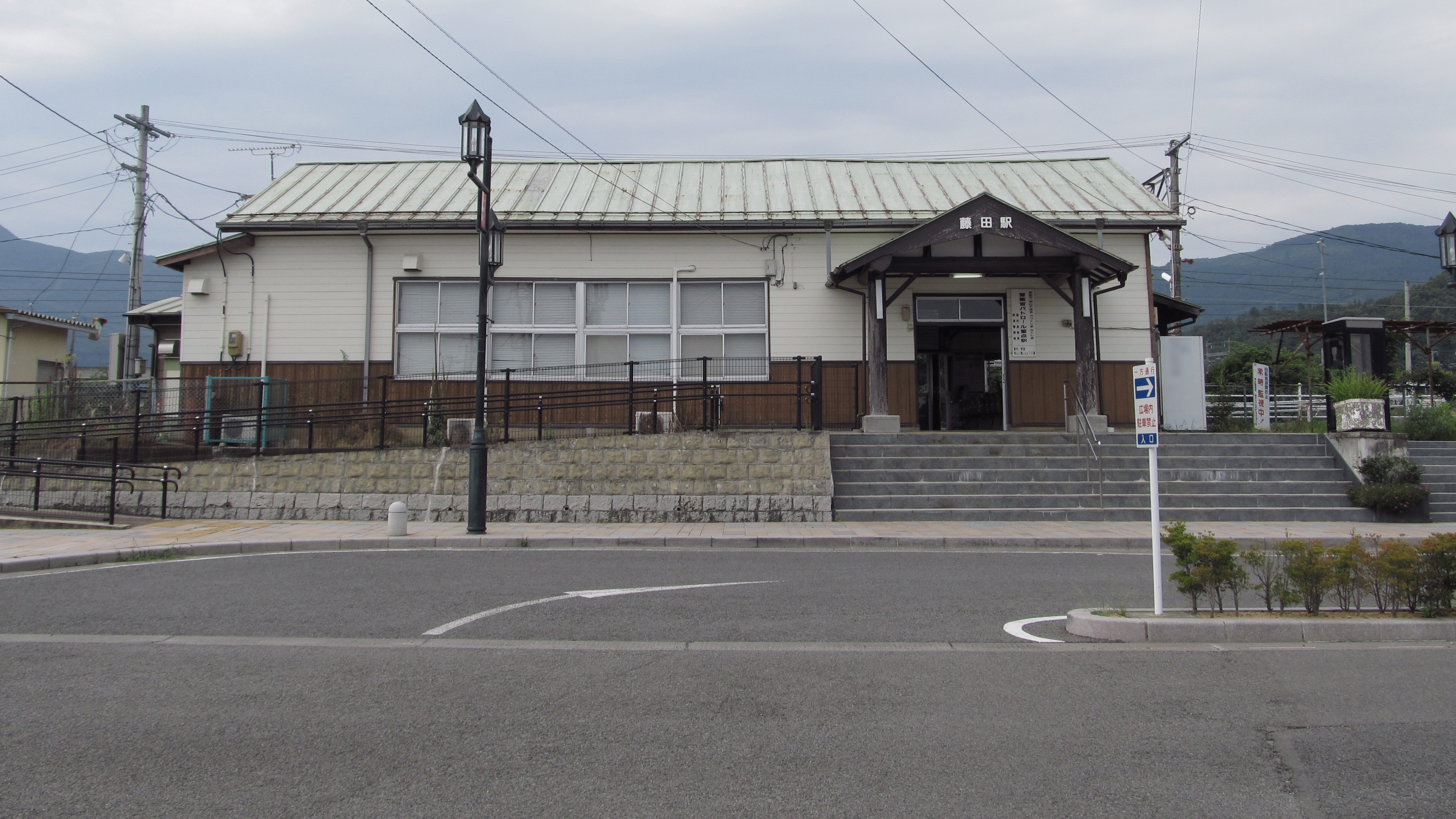
- Fujita Station in August 2014

General information
- Location: Yamazaki Kitamachida 12, Kunimi-machi, Date-gun, Fukushima-ken 969-1771; Japan
- Coordinates: 37°52′44.62″N 140°32′22.71″E
- Operator: JR East
- Line: ■ Tōhoku Main Line
- Distance: 289.3 km from Tokyo
- Platforms: 1 island + 1 side platforms
- Tracks: 3

Other information
- Status: Staffed ("Midori no Madoguchi")
- Website: Official website

History
- Opened: September 5, 1900

Passengers
- FY 2018: 645 daily

Services
Preceding station	JR East	Following station
Koori towards Fukushima	Tōhoku Main Line Rapid City Rabbit	Shiroishi towards Sendai
Koori towards Kuroiso	Tōhoku Main Line Local	Kaida towards Morioka
Location
- Location within Fukushima Prefecture Location within Japan

Fujita Station (藤田駅, Fujita-eki) is a railway station in the town of Kunimi, Fukushima, Japan operated by East Japan Railway Company (JR East).

== Lines ==
Fujita Station is served by the Tōhoku Main Line, and is located 289.3 rail kilometers from the official starting point of the line at Tokyo Station.

== Station layout ==
The station has one side platform and oneisland platform connected to the station building by a footbridge. The station has a Midori no Madoguchi staffed ticket office.

=== Platforms ===
1	■ Tōhoku Main Line	for Fukushima
2	■ Tōhoku Main Line	for Fukushima and Shiroishi (starting trains)
3	■ Tōhoku Main Line	for Shiroishi

== History ==
Fujita Station opened on September 5, 1900. The station was absorbed into the JR East network upon the privatization of the Japanese National Railways (JNR) on April 1, 1987.

== Passenger statistics ==
In fiscal 2018, the station was used by an average of 645 passengers daily (boarding passengers only).

Passenger Change
Year	Daily Average Number of Passengers
2000	868
2001	846
2002	806
2003	792
2004	785
2005	771
2006	771
2007	741
2008	727
2009	718
2010	681
2011	701
2012	693
2013	708

== Surrounding area ==
- Kunimi Post Office
- Kunimi town hall
- National Route 4

== See also ==
- List of railway stations in Japan
