= Date Station =

Railway station in Date, Fukushima Prefecture, Japan

Date Station 伊達駅
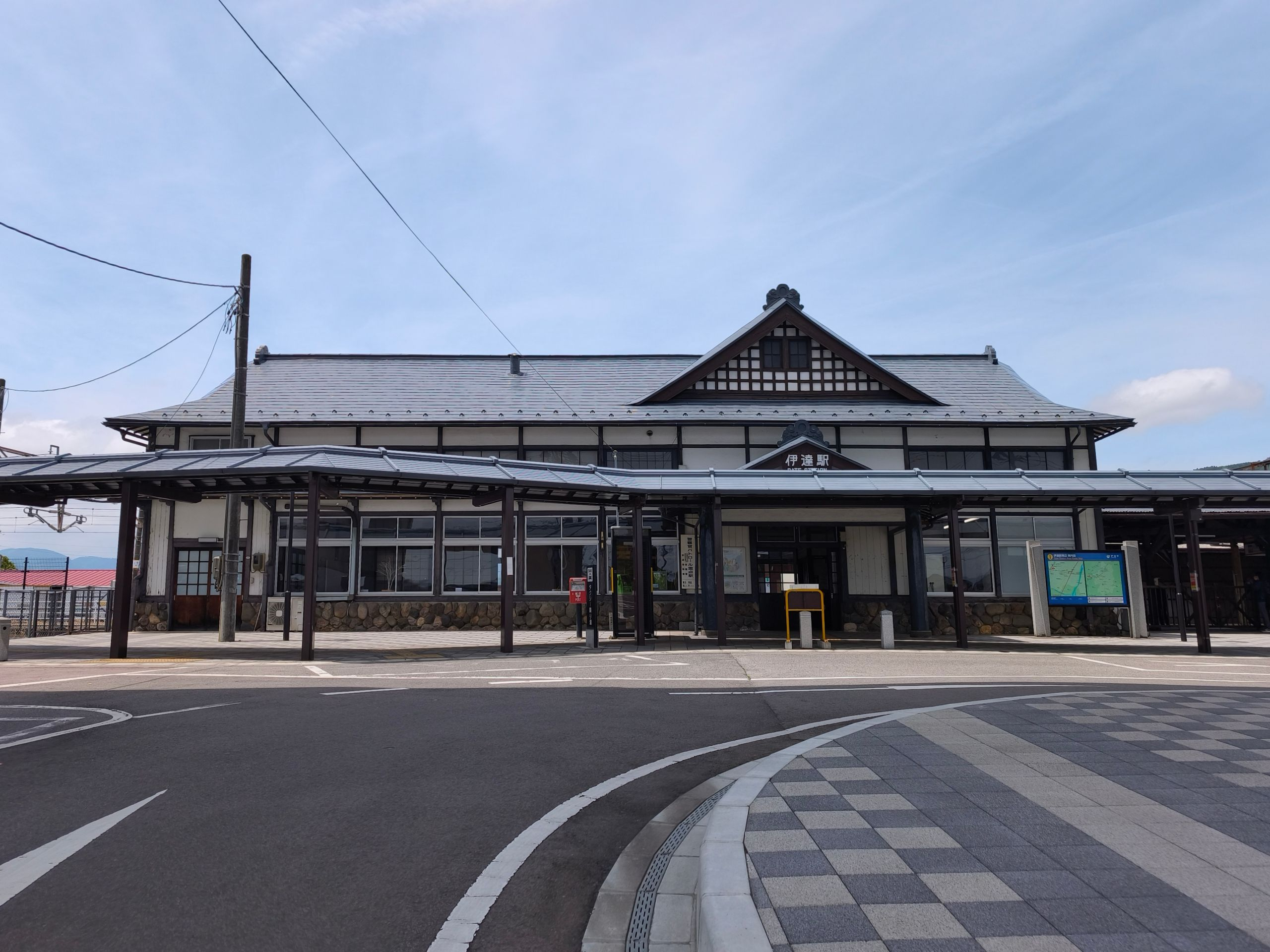
- Date Station in June 2026

General information
- Location: 12 Hosoya, Date-shi, Fukushima-ken 960-0478; Japan
- Coordinates: 37°49′26.39″N 140°29′36.05″E
- Operator: JR East
- Line: ■ Tōhoku Main Line
- Distance: 281.9 km from Tokyo
- Platforms: 2 side platforms
- Tracks: 2

Other information
- Status: Staffed
- Website: Official website

History
- Opened: April 1, 1895
- Former names: Nagaoka (until 1914)

Passengers
- FY2013: 941 daily

Services
Preceding station	JR East	Following station
Higashi-Fukushima towards Fukushima	Tōhoku Main Line Rapid City Rabbit	Koori towards Sendai
Higashi-Fukushima towards Kuroiso	Tōhoku Main Line Local	Koori towards Morioka
Location
- Location within Fukushima Prefecture Location within Japan

Date Station (伊達駅, Date-eki) is a railway station on the Tōhoku Main Line in the city of Date, Fukushima, Japan, operated by East Japan Railway Company (JR East).

== Lines ==
Date Station is served by the Tōhoku Main Line, and is located 281.9 kilometers from the official starting point of the line at Tokyo Station.

== Station layout ==
Date Station has two opposed side platforms connected to the station building by a footbridge. There is also a parking lot with both paid parking and an option to park free of cost for up to thirty minutes. The station is attended.

=== Platforms ===
1	■ Tohoku Main Line	for Fukushima
2	■ Tohoku Main Line	for Sendai

== History ==
The station opened on April 1, 1895, as Nagaoka Station (長岡駅). It was renamed "Date Station" on December 1, 1914. The current station building was completed in 1939 and built to resemble a building adjacent to the Ryozen Shrine in Date City's former town of Ryozen. The station was absorbed into the JR East network upon the privatization of the Japanese National Railways (JNR) on April 1, 1987. In 2002, it was chosen to be one of 100 stations representing the Tōhoku region. In 2020 renovations were completed on the area in front of the station.

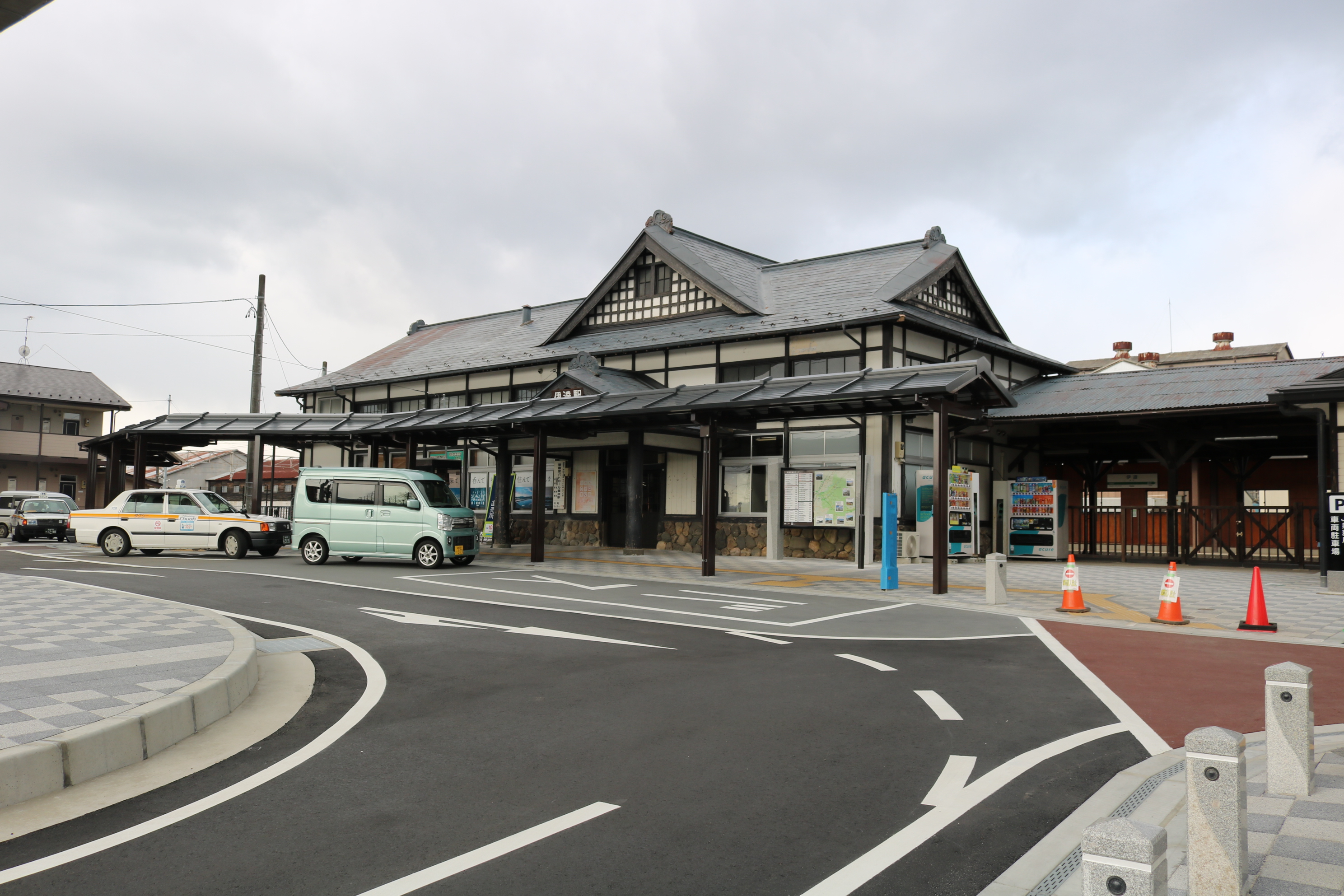
Date Station as of Feb. 2020

== Passenger statistics ==
In fiscal 2016, the station was used by an average of 941 passengers daily (boarding passengers only).

== Surrounding area ==
- Date Post Office
- Former Date town hall
- National Route 4
- National Route 399

== See also ==
- List of railway stations in Japan
