= Aoimori Park =

Urban park in Aomori, Japan

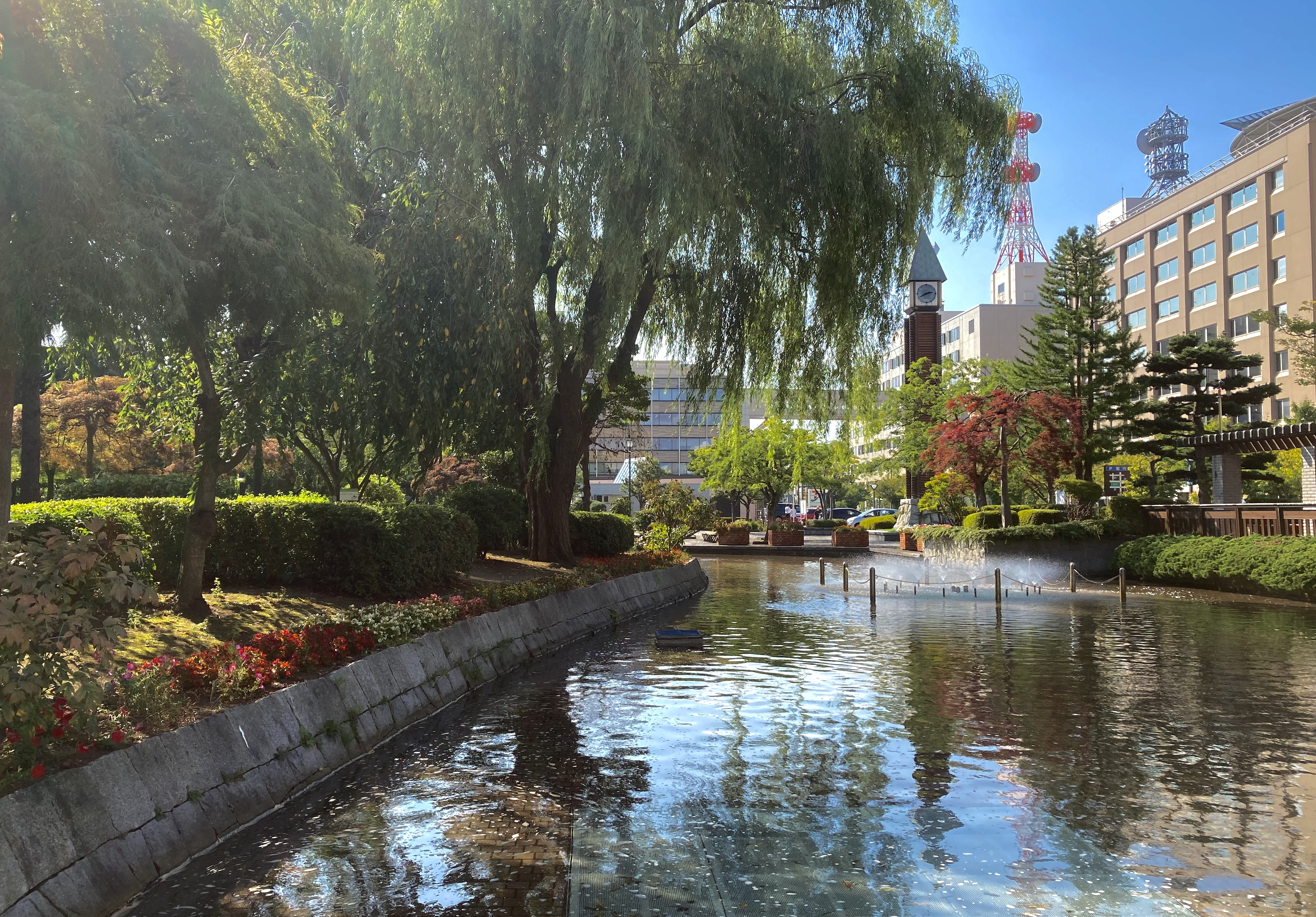
- Interactive map of Aoimori Park
- Location: Nagashima, Aomori, Japan
- Coordinates: 40°49′27″N 140°44′31″E
- Area: 1.8 ha (4.4 acres)
- Created: 1985
- Public transit: Aomori City Bus

Aoimori Park (青い森公園, Aoimori kōen) is a 1.8-hectare (4.4-acre) urban park in the central district of Aomori Prefecture's capital city, Aomori in northern Japan. Acting as an urban green space in the city's dense administrative district, it features various themed landscapes. It has been maintained by the prefectural government of Aomori since its opening in 1985. It is also the official ending point for National Route 4 and National Route 7. Various monuments and markers within and near the park denote the terminus of the two highways.

== Description ==
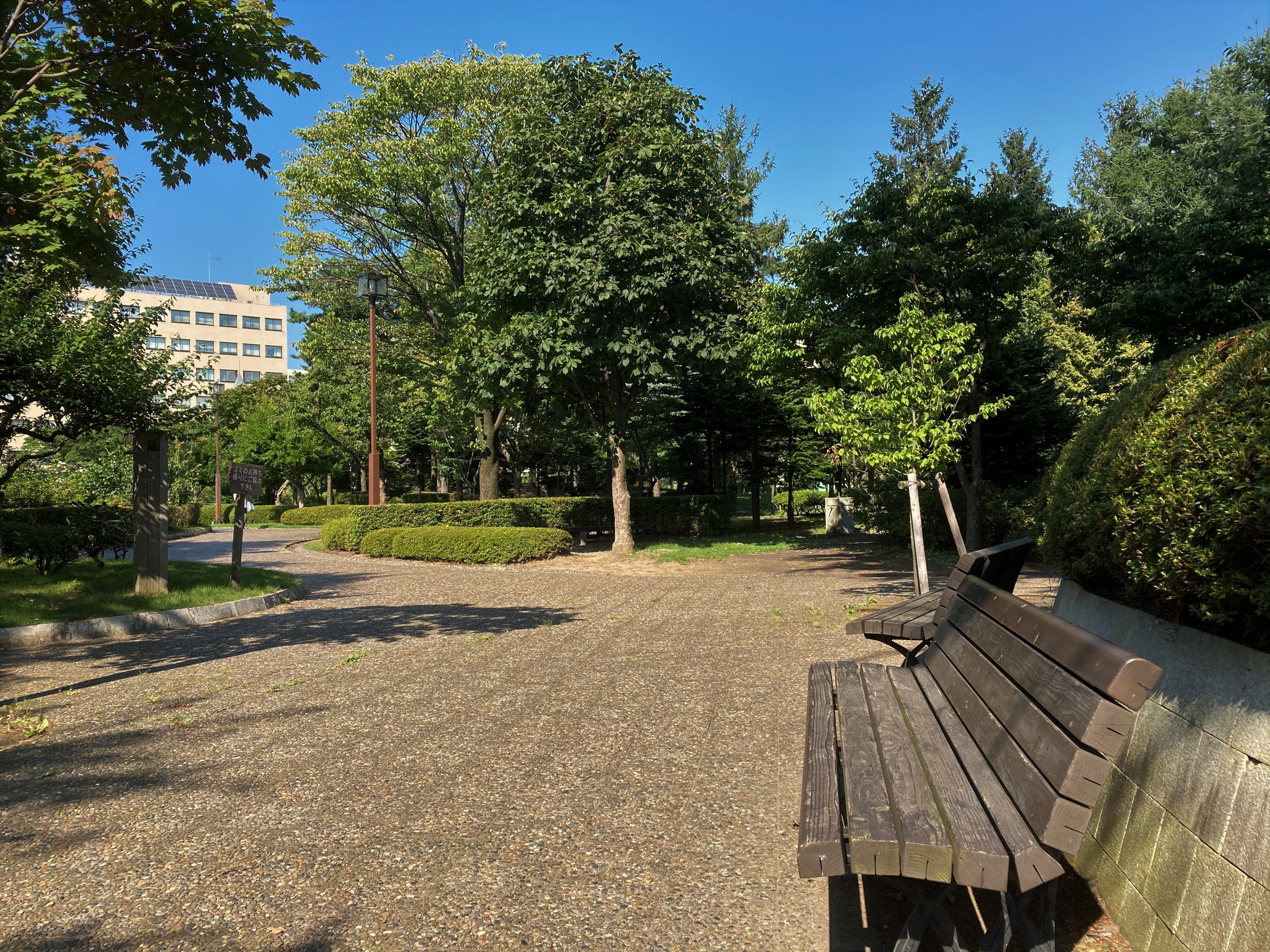
A pathway in Aoimori Park with a bench in its forest area

The park lies in the otherwise dense administrative district of Aomori. It is surrounded to the west, north, and south by office buildings, made primarily up of administrative buildings for the government of Aomori Prefecture. Its boundaries are marked by city streets, though its southern boundary is formed by National Route 4 and National Route 7. These highways have their northern end points at the park, this is detailed on several markers and monuments within the park.

=== Design and layout ===
Aoimori Park is divided into a relaxation area, an arboretum of local symbolic trees, a playground, a flower garden, and a grass field. The relaxing area features an aquatic garden within a cobblestone plaza with nearby benches and a pergola. A clock tower presides across this area, sitting in a visually prominent location near the western edge of the plaza. The arboretum features trees and flowering plants that are symbolic of each of the municipalities of Aomori Prefecture. A playground near the southwestern corner of the park embodies the "contact" theme.

In addition to these features, the park is home to a 7-Eleven convenience store that sits in the northwestern corner of the park. Its parking lot is utilized during the annual Aomori Nebuta Matsuri and other special events, such as being a stop during the 2020 Summer Olympics torch relay.

== History ==
The planning process of the park began on 24 July 1982. It was first envisioned by planners as a 1.3 ha (3.2-acre) urban park on the former site of the Aomori Prefectural Central Hospital. The park partially opened on 1 June 1985, with only 0.9 ha (2.2 acres) of it being completed. On 19 November of the same year, planners decided to revise the initial plans for the park, expanding it to 1.6 ha (4.0 acres). The park was fully opened according to the revised plans on 3 July 1987. Further expansion to the park was planned on 10 March 1992. The expansion was completed on 22 December 1994, bringing the park to its current size of 1.8 ha (4.4 acres). The 7-Eleven convenience store was added to the park on 7 July 2016 with the intended purpose of benefiting the surrounding elderly community.
