= Higashi-Fukushima Station =

Railway station in Fukushima, Japan

Higashi-Fukushima Station 東福島駅
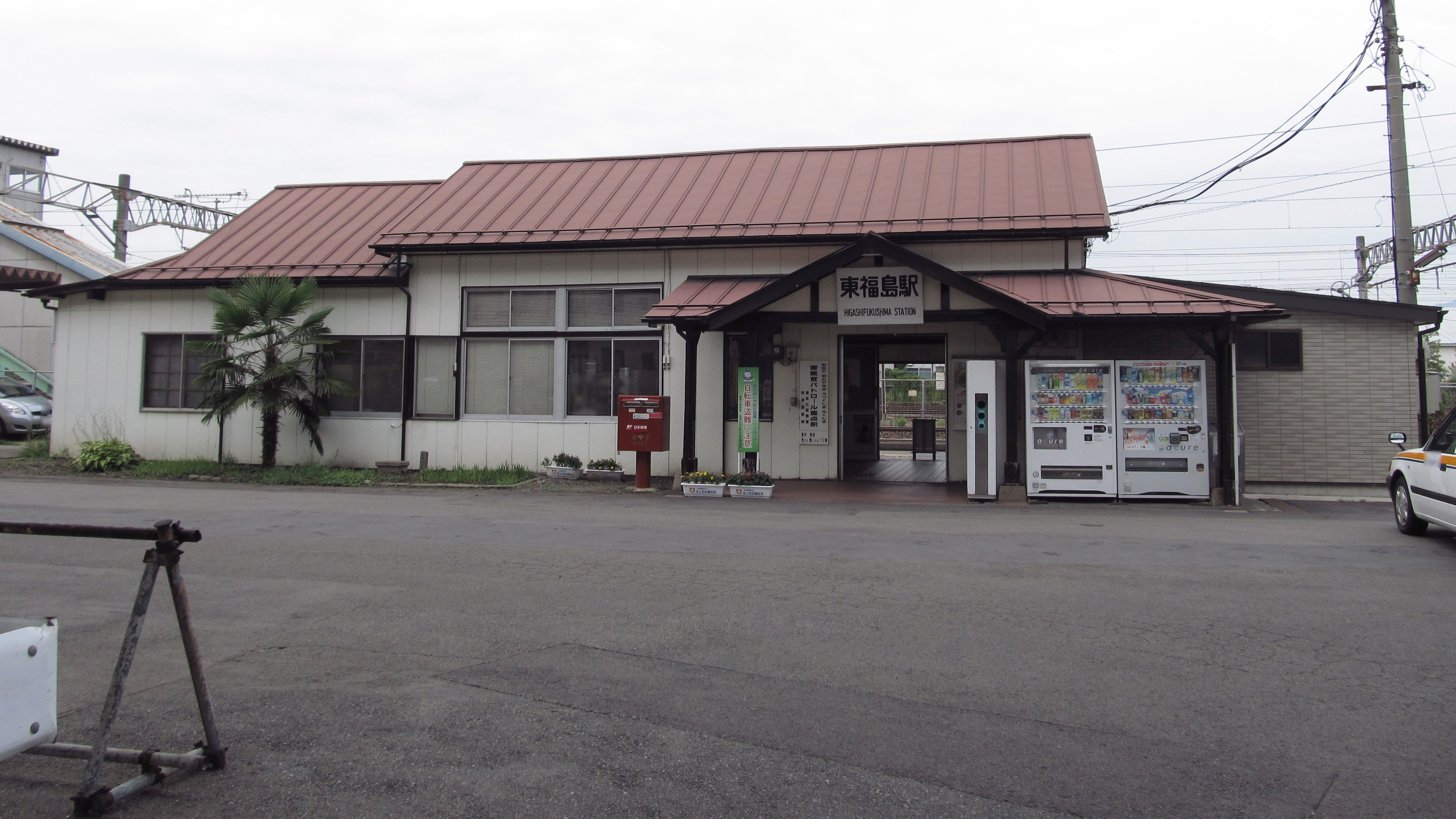
- Higashi-Fukushima Station in August 2014

General information
- Location: Donomae Kamata, Fukushima-shi, Fukushima-ken 960-0102; Japan
- Coordinates: 37°48′1.71″N 140°28′41.12″E
- Operator: East Japan Railway Company; Japan Freight Railway Company
- Line: ■ Tōhoku Main Line
- Distance: 278.8 km from Tokyo
- Platforms: 1 island platform
- Tracks: 2

Other information
- Status: Staffed
- Website: Official website

History
- Opened: October 10, 1923
- Former names: Senoue (until 1978)

Passengers
- FY2016: 730(daily)

Services
Preceding station	JR East	Following station
Fukushima Terminus	Tōhoku Main Line Rapid City Rabbit	Date towards Sendai
Fukushima towards Kuroiso	Tōhoku Main Line Local	Date towards Morioka
Location
- Location within Fukushima Prefecture Location within Japan

Higashi-Fukushima Station (東福島駅, Higashi-Fukushima-eki) is a railway station in the city of Fukushima, Fukushima Prefecture, Japan operated by East Japan Railway Company (JR East), with a freight terminal operated by the Japan Freight Railway Company.

== Lines ==
Higashi-Fukushima Station is served by the Tōhoku Main Line, and is located 278.8 rail kilometers from the official starting point of the line at Tokyo Station.

== Station layout ==
The station has one island platform connected to the station building by a footbridge. The station is staffed.

=== Platforms ===
1	■ Tōhoku Main Line	for Fukushima
2	■ Tōhoku Main Line	for Sendai

== History ==
Higashi-Fukushima Station opened on October 10, 1923, as Senoue Station (瀬上駅, Senoue-eki). The station was renamed o its present name on June 1, 1978. The station was absorbed into the JR East network upon the privatization of the Japanese National Railways (JNR) on April 1, 1987.

== Passenger statistics ==
In fiscal 2016, the station was used by an average of 730 passengers daily (boarding passengers only).

Passenger Change
Year	Daily Average Number of Passengers
2000	844
2001	821
2002	806
2003	857
2004	846
2005	864
2006	852
2007	841
2008	826
2009	779
2010	761
2011	776
2012	756
2013	746。

== Surrounding area ==
- Fukushima-Higashi Post Office
- Toyo Rubber Fukushima factory
- Ohara Medical Center

== See also ==
- List of railway stations in Japan
