= Manseibashi Station =

Former railway stations in Tokyo, Japan

Manseibashi Station 万世橋駅
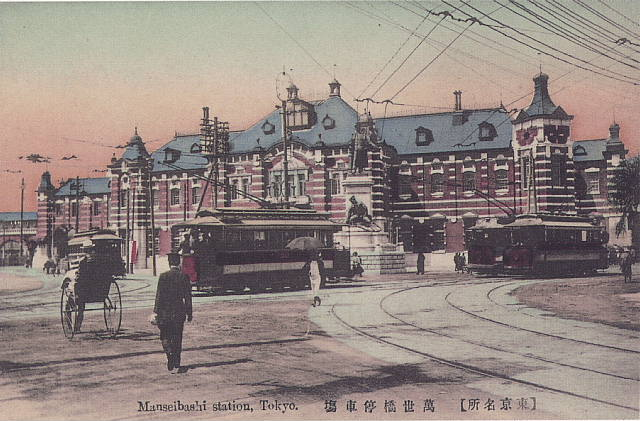
- Original building of JGR Manseibashi Station

General information
- Location: Kanda, Tokyo; Japan
- Operator: Japanese Government Railways, Tokyo Underground Railway

History
- Opened: 1912 (Government); 1930 (Underground)
- Closed: 1931 (Underground); November 1, 1943 (Government)
Location

Manseibashi Station (万世橋駅, Manseibashi-eki) can refer to two closed railway stations all in Chiyoda, Tokyo, Japan. One was a railway station on the Japanese Government Railways Chūō Main Line and the other was a subway station in the Tokyo Underground Railway network.

Both stations were closed by 1943, though trains and subway cars still pass through them. The stations took their name from the nearby bridge, Manseibashi. The railway station was located on the south bank of the Kanda River, while the subway station was located on the north bank. The area north of the bridge is known as "Akihabara Electric Town". Some train enthusiasts have dubbed Manseibashi station "the phantom station".

== Government railway station ==
The old Manseibashi Station on the Chūō Main Line of Japanese Government Railways was in the Kanda Ward (now part of Chiyoda Ward), and is located between Ochanomizu Station and Kanda Station.

- Location: 35°41′49″N 139°46′13″E

=== History ===
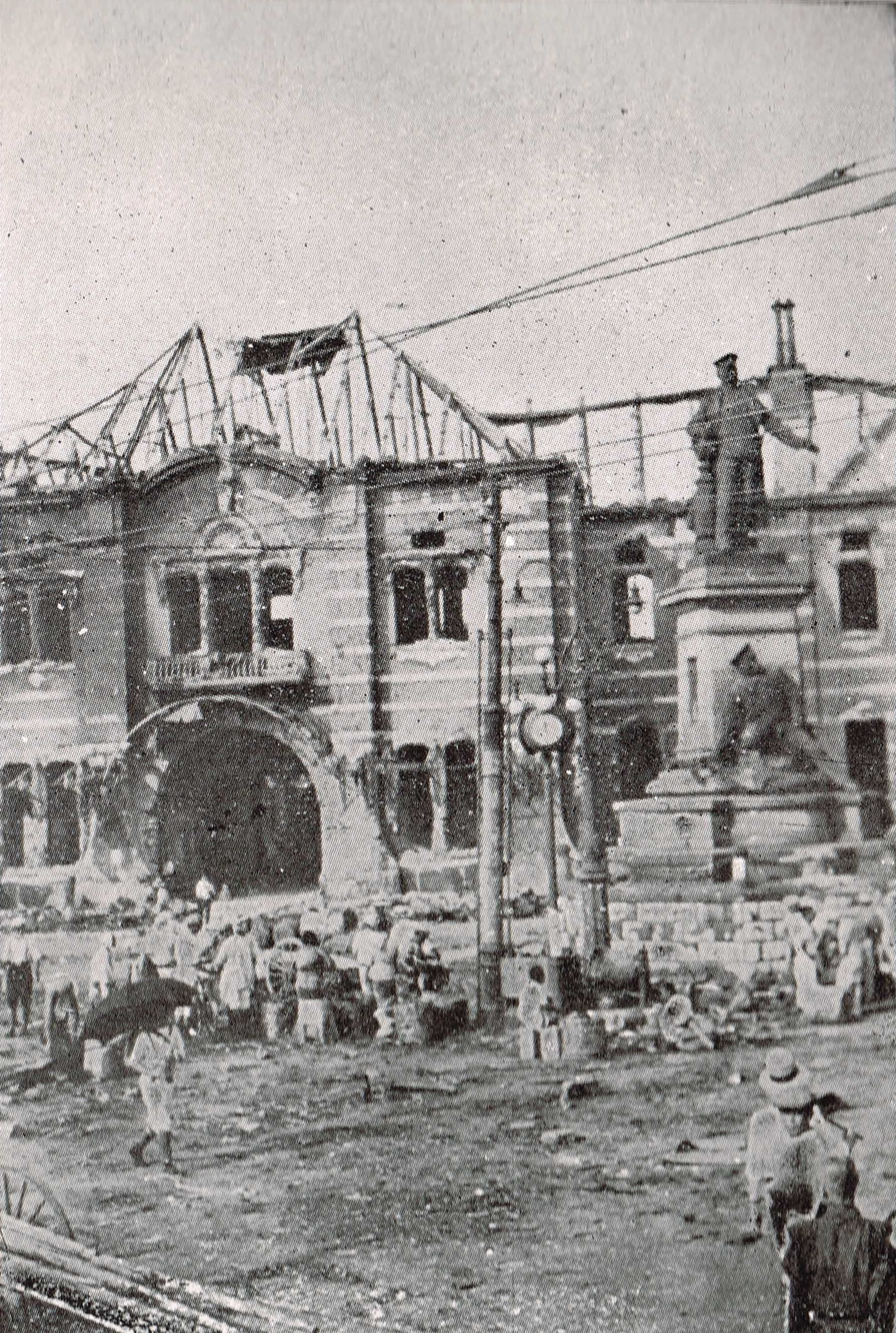
The front of the totally destroyed station after the 1923 Great Kantō earthquake.

The private Kōbu Railway (甲武鉄道) between Tachikawa and Shinjuku was opened on April 11, 1889. The line was gradually extended east towards the center of Tokyo and was nationalized on October 1, 1906. The line was further extended to Manseibashi Station, which was opened on April 1, 1912 and remained the eastern terminal station of the line for seven years.

The first station building was designed by Tatsuno Kingo in a style inspired by the Amsterdam Centraal and repeated in his design of Tokyo Station, opened two years later. A statue of Takeo Hirose was erected in front of the station.

After the 1914 opening of Tokyo Station, Manseibashi still served as the eastern terminal station of the Chūō Main Line until March 1, 1919, when the line was further extended and Kanda Station opened. The 1923 Great Kantō earthquake destroyed the original station building, and a simpler station building was erected in its place. The statue of Hirose was left standing.

In 1925, the elevated railway running through Ueno Station and Akihabara Station was opened for passenger traffic. Since both Akihabara and Kanda stations were within walking distance of Manseibashi, passenger numbers at Manseibashi decreased. On April 26, 1936, the Railway Museum moved into Manseibashi Station, and the station building itself was scaled back in November 1936. The station was officially closed on November 1, 1943 and the station building was completely torn down. The statue was removed after World War II.

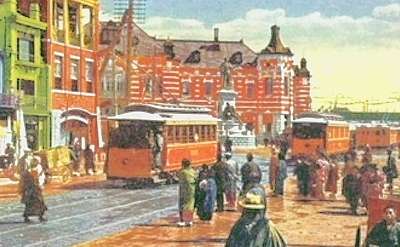
JGR Manseibashi Station in the original design. The view is from the street side, looking north-east, showing trams on the street. The Chūō Main Line is on the river side, mostly hidden behind the buildings, but it emerges behind the station building and continues to Kanda in the east (right); this dates the image to between early 1919 and September 1923.

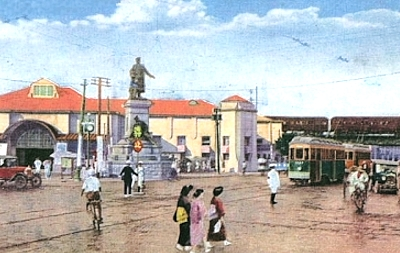
JGR Manseibashi Station reconstructed after the 1923 Great Kantō earthquake. In this image, looking almost due north, a train on the line is also shown.

=== Closure and redevelopment ===
The train line continues to run through the site, and it is used for parking the occasional train. The Tokyo Railway Museum became the Transportation Museum in 1971, and continued to operate on the site until 2006, when the museum was re-focused towards railways and moved to Saitama, Saitama as the Railway Museum.

In July 2012, work started to redevelop the site, with the original redbrick structure forming the basis of a new office and retail complex scheduled to open in summer 2013. JR East built decks and a cafeteria on the platform and opened shops under the bridge.

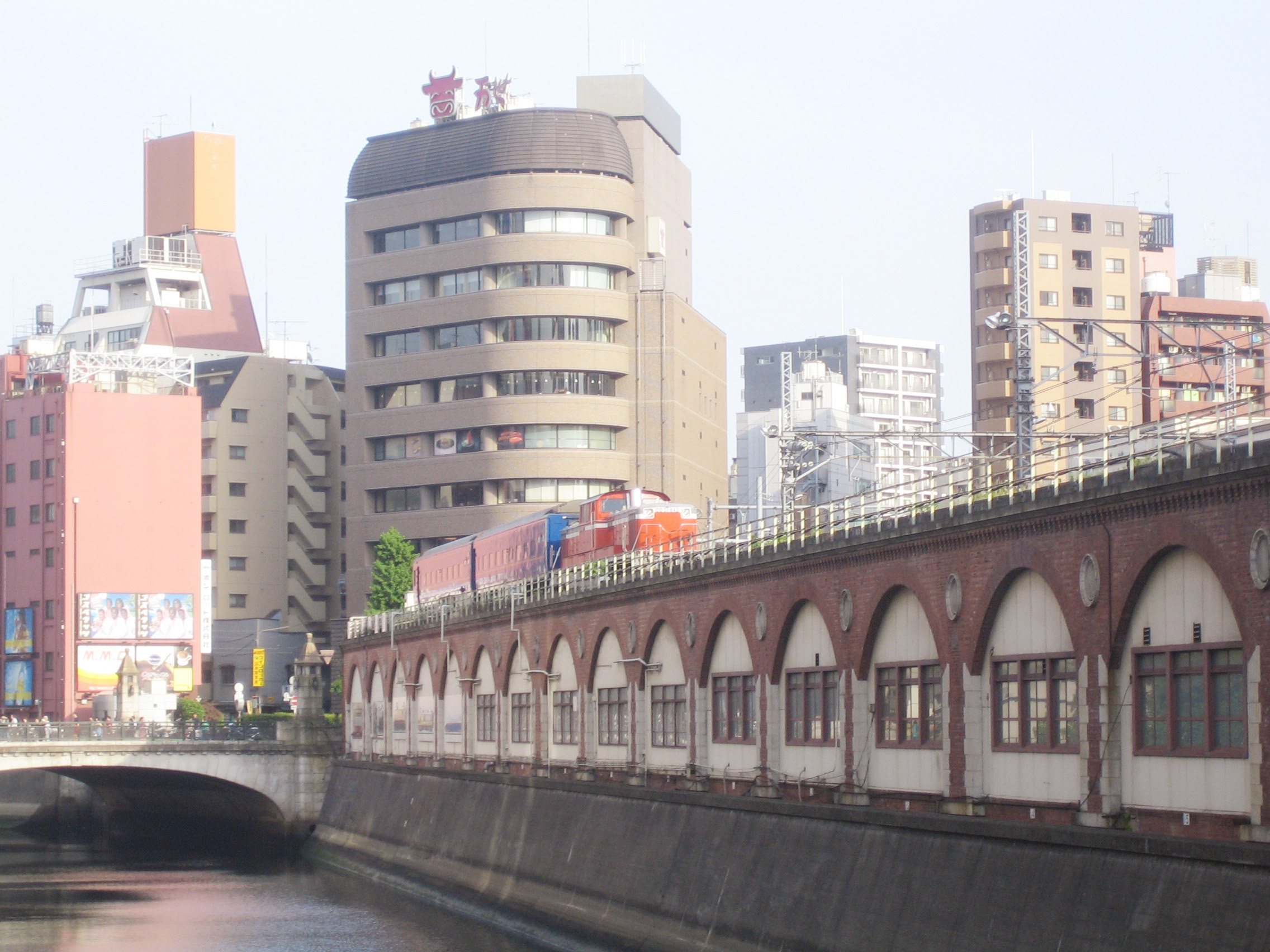
Mansei bridge in 2006, looking south-eastward from the next road bridge

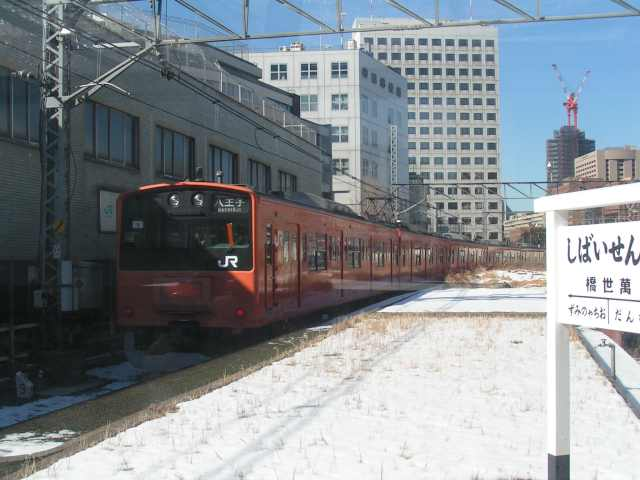
Manseibashi in 2006, looking westward towards Ochanomizu Station

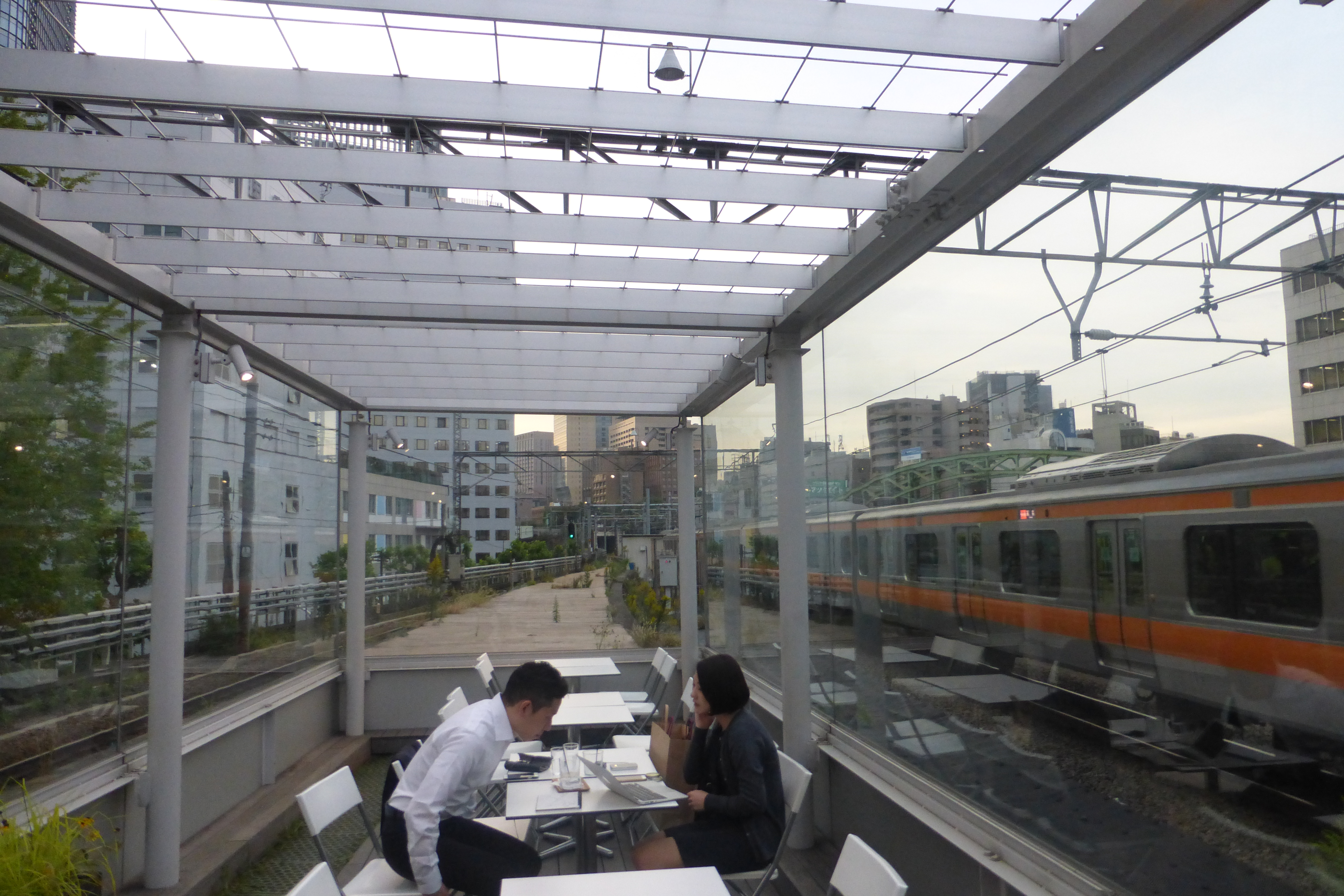
Redeveloped platform with a restaurant, 2016

== Subway station ==
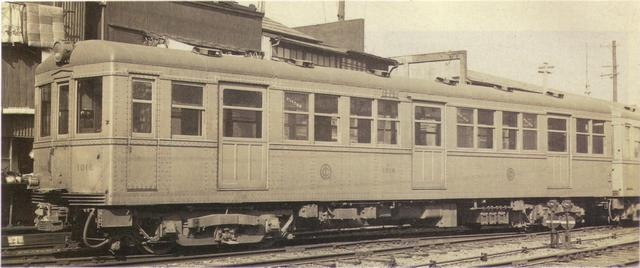
One of the original "Type 1000" trains operating on the Tokyo Underground Railway line from Manseibashi

The Tokyo Underground Railway Manseibashi subway station was on what is now the Tokyo Metro Ginza Line, situated between the Kanda and Suehirochō stations. It was within the old Kanda Ward, like the JGR station, but on the opposite bank of the Kanda River.

- Location: 35°41′52″N 139°46′16″E

=== History ===
The subway line between Ueno and Asakusa, opened in 1927, was being extended southward. When the extension reached the Kanda River, a temporary subway station was opened at Manseibashi on January 1, 1930. This station was closed again on November 21, 1931 since the line had been extended across the Kanda River to Kanda Station itself.

=== Current situation ===
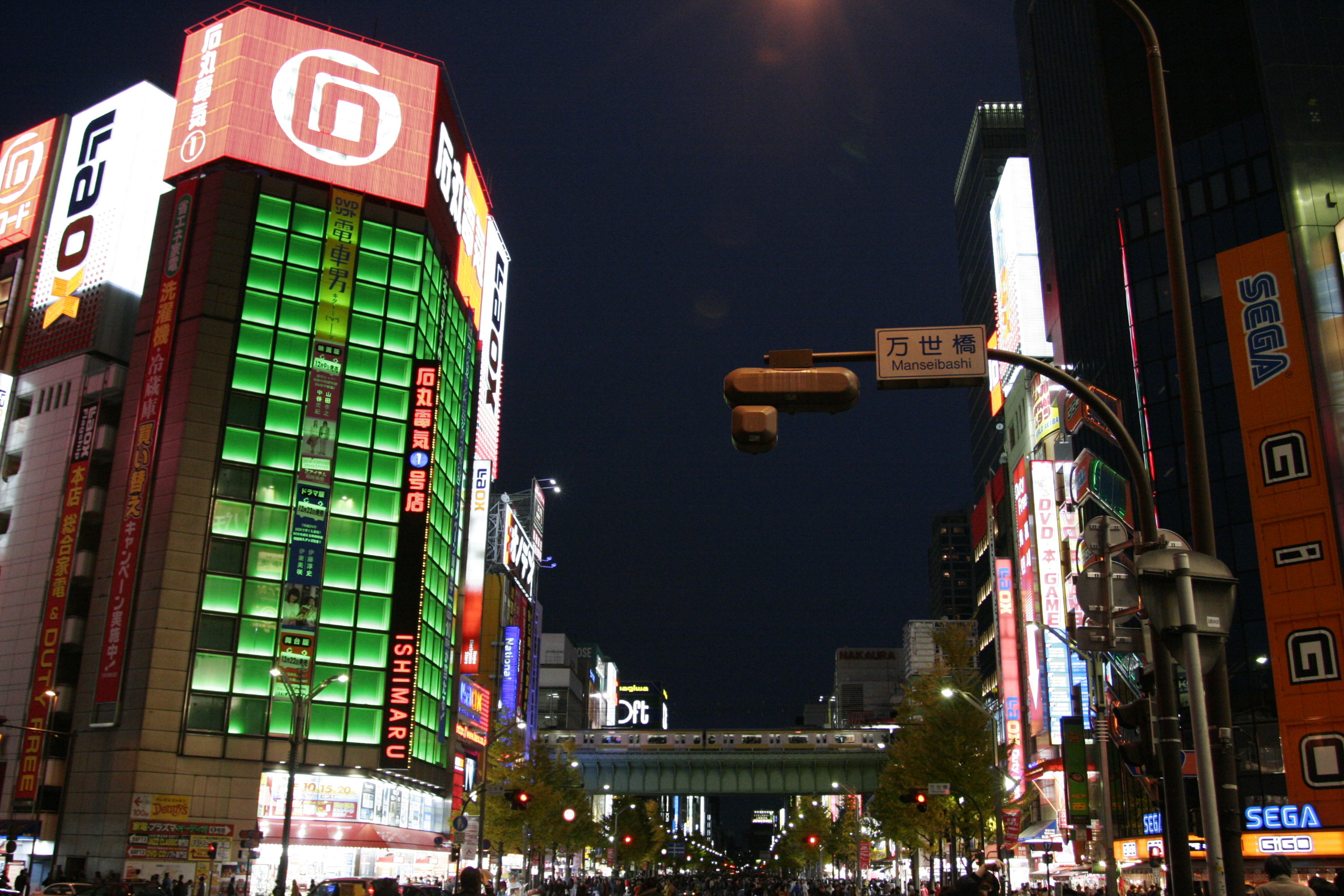
The opening to the remains of Manseibashi Subway Station is in front of the Ishimaru shopping center's Store 1 (now an EDION store) to the left. The intersection is called Manseibashi, after the bridge (sign, center-right).

The Tokyo Underground Railway subway station is currently still closed as a station, but the opening remains as a ventilation shaft, emergency exit and maintenance access point for the metro line. The opening and stairs are under grating on the sidewalk in Akihabara, Tokyo's "Electric Town" and a major shopping area for consumer electronics, hobby electronics, manga and anime. One anime series, RahXephon, set some of its important scenes in this station, showing it restored and modernized in 2015.

The station is hard to detect by Ginza Line riders. The ceiling is higher on the station, but very little of the other structure remains.

== See also ==
- History of Tokyo
- Transportation in Greater Tokyo
- Rail transport in Japan
