= Japan National Route 457 =

Road in Japan

National Route 457
- 国道457号
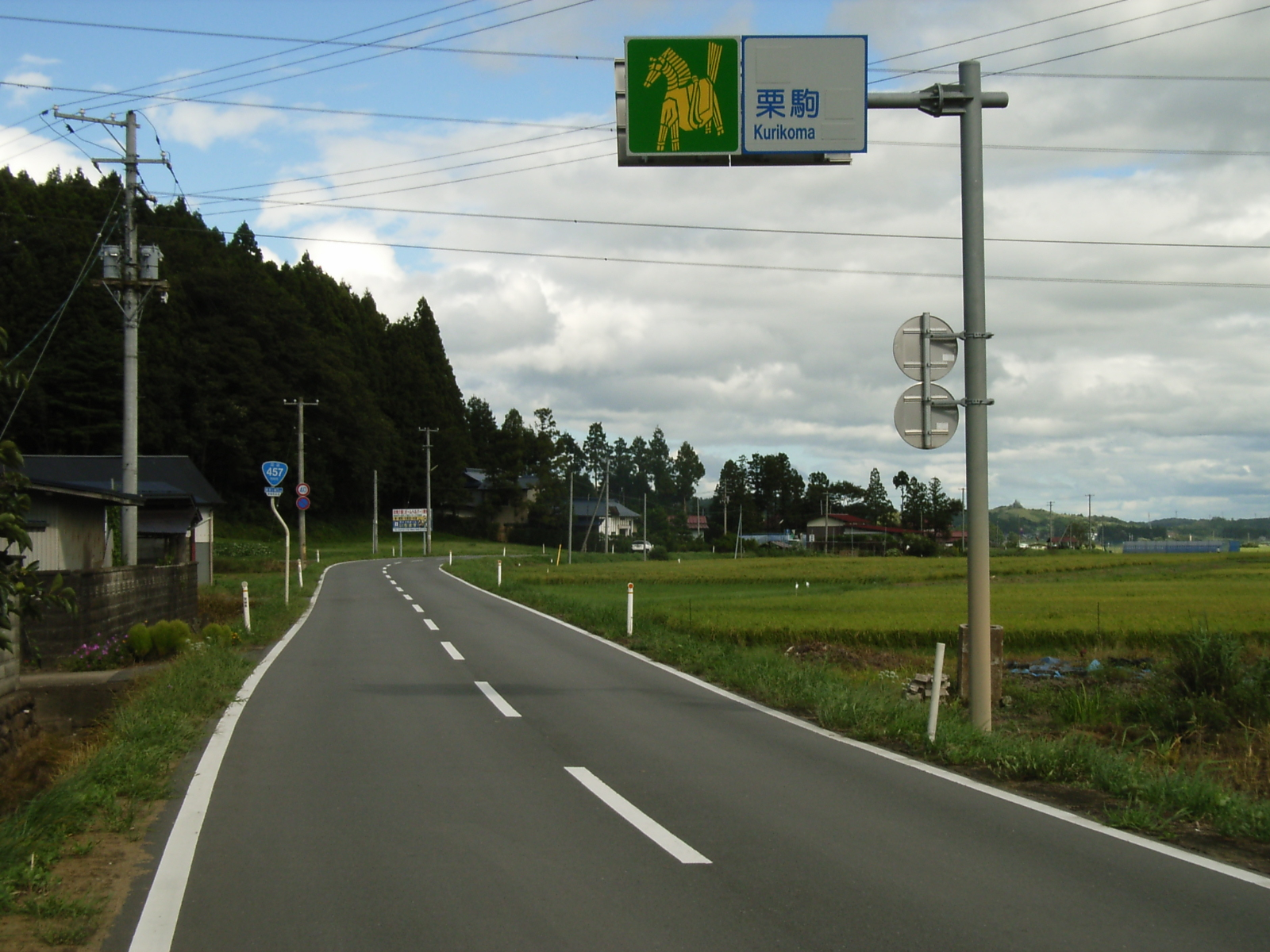

Route information
- Length: 173.9 km (108.1 mi)

Location
- Country: Japan

Highway system
- National highways of Japan; Expressways of Japan
← National Route 456	→ National Route 458

National Route 457 is a national highway of Japan connecting Ichinoseki, Iwate and Shiroishi, Miyagi in Japan, with a total length of 173.9 km (108.06 mi).
