= Manseibashi =

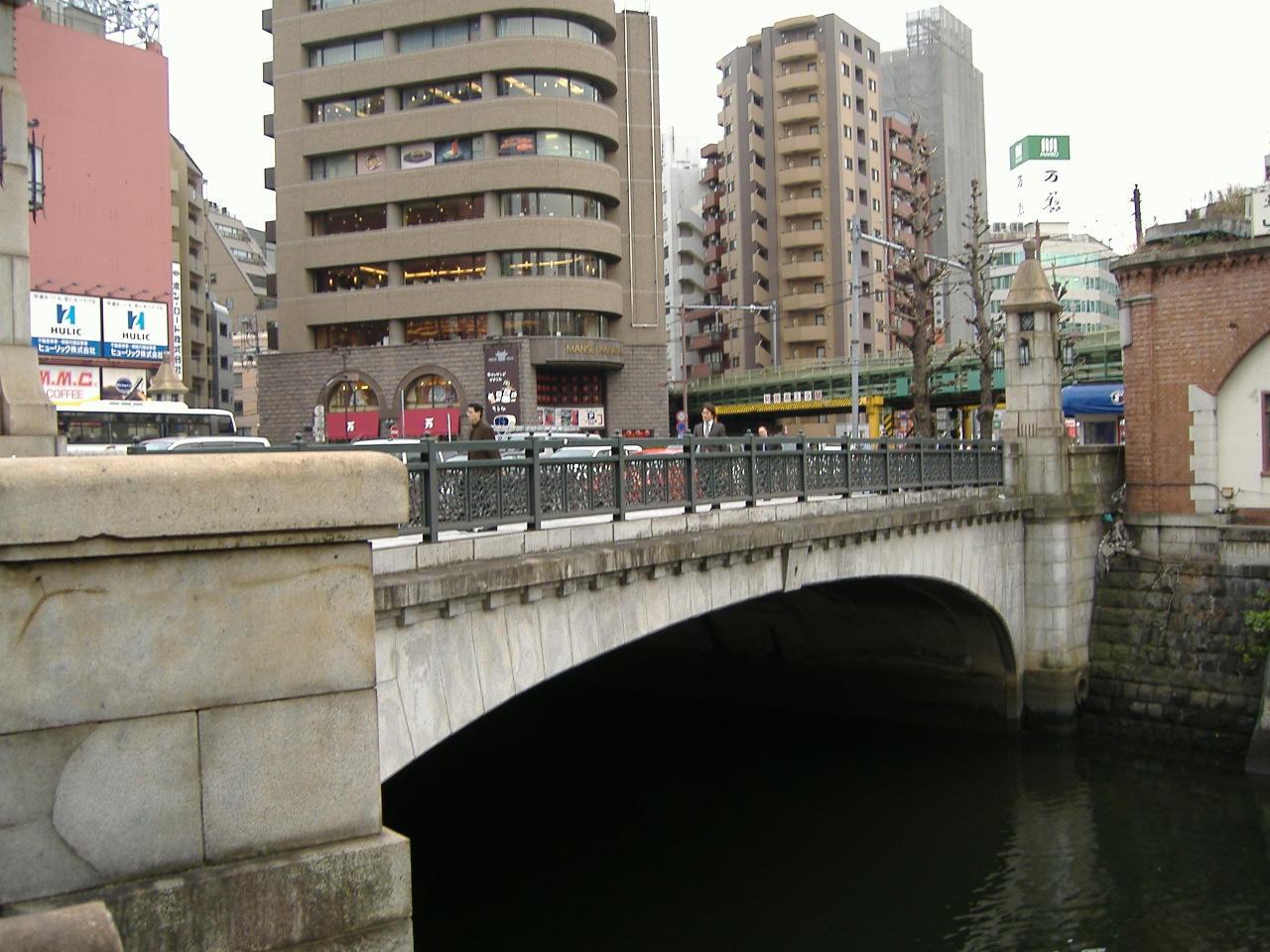
- Manseibashi
- Coordinates: 35°41′49.7″N 139°46′15.5″E
- Carries: National Route 17
- Crosses: Kanda River
- Locale: Chiyoda, Tokyo
- Maintained by: Ministry of Land, Infrastructure, Transport and Tourism

Characteristics
- Design: Arch bridge

History
- Opened: 1930

Mansei Bridge (万世橋, Manseibashi) is a concrete single arch bridge across the Kanda River in Chiyoda, Tokyo. The bridge carries National Route 17 across the Kanda River. Two former public transport stations and a police station nearby are named after the bridge.

Various bridges made of wood or stone were the predecessors to the current bridge, which stands at the location of what was once one of Tokyo's city gates. The latest bridge was constructed in 1930.

== See also ==
- Manseibashi Station, the former station complex which derives its name from this bridge
