= Japan National Route 4 =

Japanese National Highway from Chuo-ku, Tokyo to Aomori, Aomori Prefecture

National Route 4
- 国道4号
- Japan National Route 4 highlighted in red

Route information
- Length: 738.5 km (458.9 mi)
- Existed: 4 December 1952–present

Major junctions
- South end: National Route 1 / National Route 15 / National Route 20 in Nihonbashi, Chūō-ku, Tokyo
- National Route 6; National Route 14; National Route 17; National Route 16; National Route 50; National Route 49; National Route 13; National Route 45; National Route 47; National Route 46
- North end: National Route 7- Aomori West Bypass in Nagashima, Aomori, Aomori

Location
- Country: Japan

Highway system
- National highways of Japan; Expressways of Japan
| ← National Route 3 | → National Route 5 |

National Route 4 (国道4号, Kokudō Yongō) is a major national highway in eastern Honshū, Japan. Measuring 738.5 kilometers long (458.9 mi), it is the longest highway in the country. When oversea routes are included, it is the second longest highway in Japan, with National Route 58 then measuring 884.4 kilometers (549.5 mi) because of its maritime sections. The highway connects Tokyo and Aomori via Utsunomiya, Kōriyama, Sendai, and Morioka.

From Saitama Prefecture to Iwate Prefecture, it parallels the Tōhoku Expressway; from Morioka to Hachinohe, it parallels the Hachinohe Expressway. At its northern terminus it links with National Route 7.

== Route description ==
=== Tokyo ===
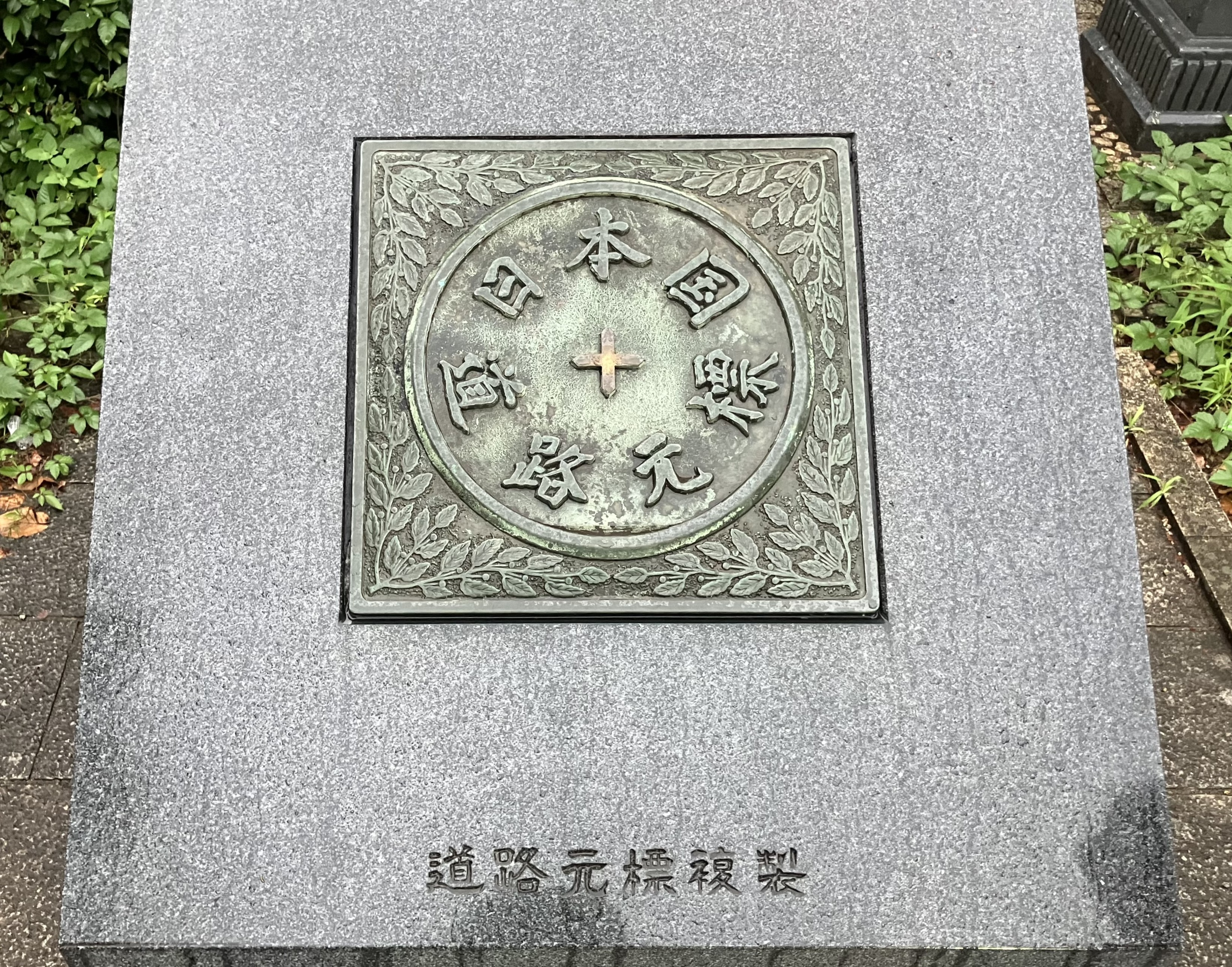
Kilometer zero marker of Japanese highways in Nihonbashi

The southern terminus of National Route 4 lies at Nihonbashi, the kilometer zero of Japan in Chūō, Tokyo. The marker here signifies the terminus of national highways including National Route 1, National Route 6, National Route 14, National Route 15, National Route 17, and National Route 20. Of the mentioned highways, three travel concurrently with National Route 4 from Nihonbashi: National Routes 6, 14, and 17.

Just north of the starting point, National Route 17 leaves the concurrency continuing north while National Route 4, along with National Routes 6 and 14, turn east on to Edo-dōri. Three blocks from there Edo-dōri intersects Shōwa-dōri. National Route 4 turns on to Shōwa-dōri leaving the Edo-dōri concurrency with National Routes 6 and 14. Traveling north along Showa-dōri, National Route 4 serves as a frontage road to the Ueno Route of the Shuto Expressway system between Chūō and Taitō. The Ueno Route merges in to National Route 4 just to the northeast of Ueno Station. The highway then crosses over the Sumida River into Adachi. From the northern side of the river to Utsunomiya, the highway is known as the Nikkō Kaidō. In the ward the highway crosses beneath the Central Circular Route of the Shuto Expressway system, with an interchange with the expressway's frontage road. National Route 4 travels north through Adachi, roughly paralleling the Tobu Skytree Line. It then curves to the northwest, crossing over the Kena River into the city of Sōka in Saitama Prefecture.

=== Saitama and Ibaraki prefectures ===
- Sōka–Koshigaya–Kasukabe–Sugito–Satte–Kuki
- Koga
- Westernmost point: Kuki, Saitama just west of a bridge carrying the route over the Tone River.

=== Tochigi Prefecture ===
- Nogi–Oyama–Shimotsuke–Kaminokawa, Shimotsuke, Utsunomiya–Takanezawa–Sakura–Yaita–Otawara–Nasushiobara–Nasu

=== Fukushima Prefecture ===
- Nishigo–Shirakawa–Izumizaki–Yabuki–Kagamiishi–Sukagawa–Kōriyama–Motomiya–Ōtama–Nihonmatsu–Fukushima–Date–Koori–Kunimi

=== Miyagi Prefecture ===
- Shiroishi–Zaō–Ōgawara–Murata–Shibata–Iwanuma–Natori–Taihaku-ku, Sendai–Wakabayashi-ku, Sendai–Miyagino-ku, Sendai–Izumi-ku, Sendai–Tomiya–Taiwa–Shiroishi–Ōhira–Ōsaki–Kurihara

=== Iwate Prefecture ===
- Ichinoseki–Hiraizumi–Ōshū–Kanegasaki–Kitakami–Hanamaki–Shiwa–Yahaba–Morioka–Takizawa–Iwate–Ichinohe–Ninohe
- Highest elevation: 458 meters (1,503 ft) at Jūsanbongi Pass, Ichinohe, Iwate

=== Aomori Prefecture ===
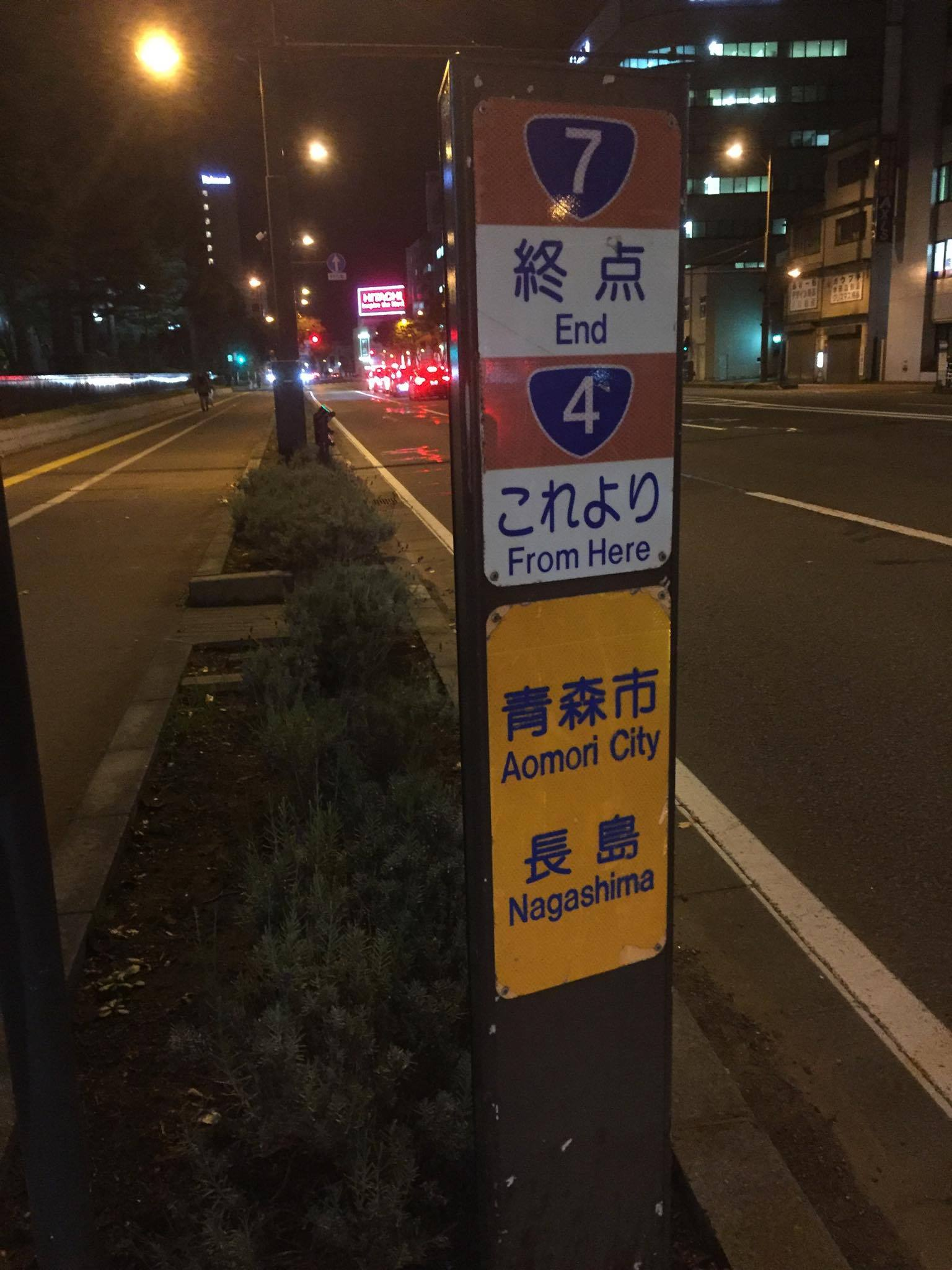
This marker denotes the northern terminus of Japan National Route 4 at Aoimori Park in Aomori.

- Sannohe–Nanbu–Gonohe–Towada–Shichinohe–Tōhoku–Noheji–Hiranai–Aomori
- Easternmost point: 150 meters (490 ft) south of the northern end of the route's concurrency with National Route 104 in Nanbu, Aomori.
- Northernmost point: Hamago, Hiranai, Aomori 200 meters (660 ft) south of Mutsu Bay.
- End point: Aomori (ends at the eastern terminus of the west bypass of National Route 7)

== History ==
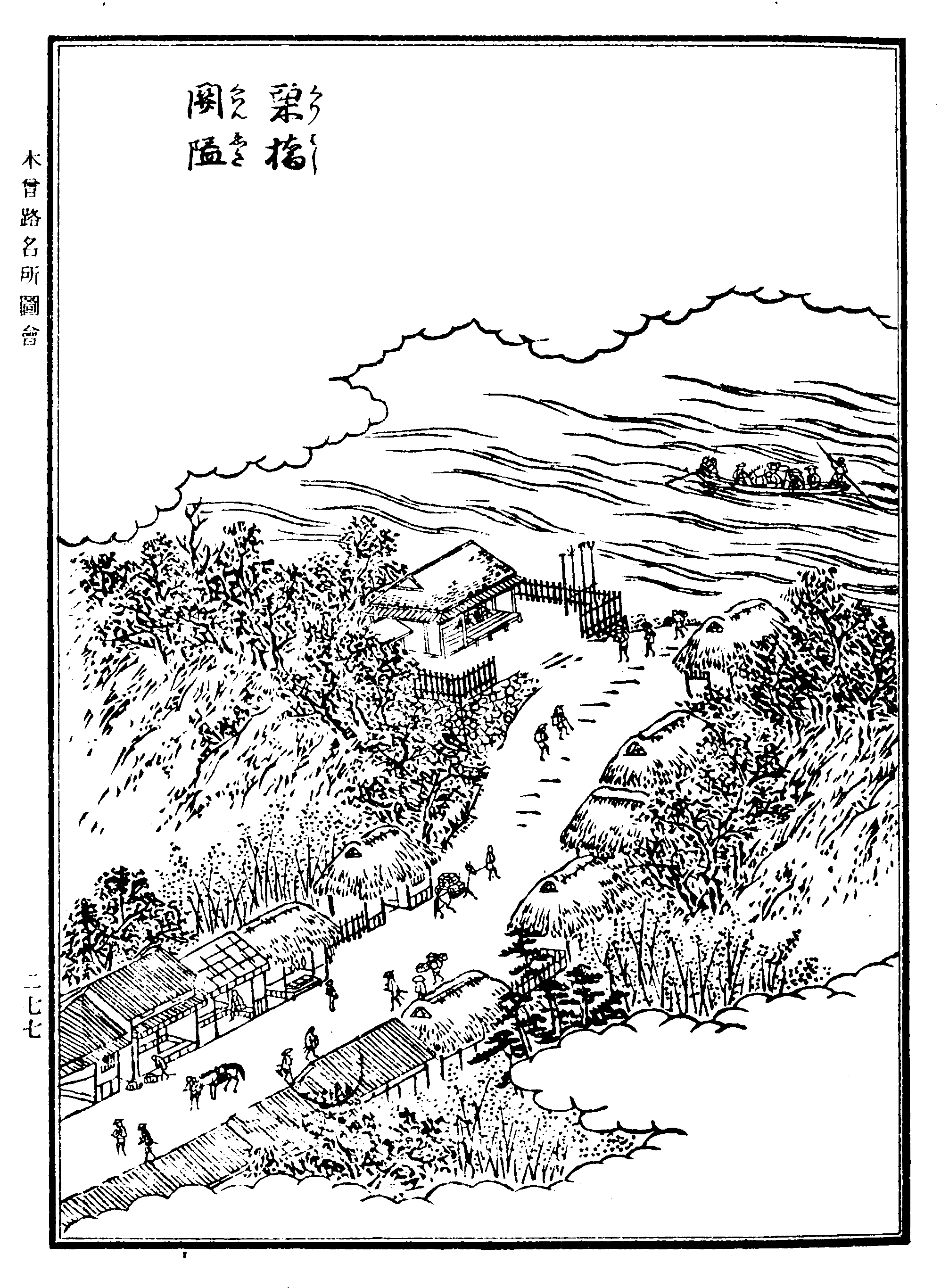
Illustration of the Ōshū Kaidō as it appeared during the Edo period

National Route 4 was preceded by the Tōsandō, a road initially established during the Asuka period as a road linking Kinai (now Kyoto and Nara) to what is now the vicinity of Morioka, Iwate. The portion of the Tōsandō that was later incorporated into National Route 4 lies between Tochigi Prefecture and Iwate Prefecture. The next development of the route came along with the creation of the Ōshū Kaidō (奥州街道) and Nikkō Kaidō (日光街道) as two of the five routes of the Edo period. They were established by Tokugawa Ieyasu for government officials traveling through the area to connect Edo (modern-day Tokyo) with Mutsu Province and the present-day city of Shirakawa, Fukushima Prefecture, Japan. There were also many roads that connected to the Ōshū Kaidō that are included in National Route 4. One such sub-route was the Sendaidō (仙台道), which connected Mutsu Province with Sendai. From Sendai, the Matsumaedō (松前道) connected Sendai with Cape Tappi and indirectly to Hakodate on the southern shore of Hokkaido on the Tsugaru Strait. Though the Ōshū Kaidō has only 27 post stations, there were over 100 designated post stations when the subroutes are included. Some sections and markers of the Ōshū Kaidō in their original state can still be found alongside National Route 4, the Hachinohe Expressway, and Tōhoku Expressway.

On 4 December 1952 First Class National Highway 4 (from Tokyo to Aomori) was established. The route was reclassified as a General National Highway on 1 April 1965.

During the 2011 Great East Japan Earthquake many sections of the route in the Tōhoku area were damaged.

== List of major junctions ==
| Prefecture | Location | km | mi | Destinations | Notes |
|---|---|---|---|---|---|
| Tokyo | Tokyo | 0.0 | 0.0 | National Route 1 west / National Route 15 south / National Route 20 west | Southern terminus; southern end of concurrency with National Routes 6, 14, and 17 |
| Tokyo | Tokyo | 0.5 | 0.31 | National Route 17 north (Nakasendō) – Sugamo, Hongō; Tokyo Metropolitan Route 407 west (Edo-dōri) – Shintokiwa Bridge | Northern end of concurrency with National Route 17 |
| Tokyo | Tokyo | 0.8 | 0.50 | National Route 6 north (Edo-dōri) / National Route 14 east – Kashiwa, Asakusabashi; Tokyo Metropolitan Route 316 south (Shōwa-dōri) – Shinagawa, Shinbashi; Ueno Route – Ueno, Iriya, Ginza, Haneda | Northern end of concurrency with National Routes 6 and 14; Ueno Route exit 181/182 (Honchō) |
| Tokyo | Tokyo | 1.5 | 0.93 | Tokyo Metropolitan Route 302 (Yasukuni-dōri) – Kudanshita | |
| Tokyo | Tokyo | 2.3 | 1.4 | Tokyo Metropolitan Route 315 east (Kuramaebashi-dōri) – Kuramae Bridge | |
| Tokyo | Tokyo | 2.8 | 1.7 | Tokyo Metropolitan Route 453 (Kasuga-dōri) – Hongō, Umaya Bridge; Ueno Route | Ueno Route exit 183 (Ueno) – northbound entrance, southbound exit |
| Tokyo | Tokyo | 2.8 | 1.7 | Tokyo Metropolitan Route 437 west (Chūō-dōri) – Ueno Park, Mansei Bridge | |
| Tokyo | Tokyo | 2.9 | 1.8 | Tokyo Metropolitan Route 463 south (Asakusa-dōri) – Asakusa | |
| Tokyo | Tokyo | 3.5 | 2.2 | Tokyo Metropolitan Route 452 west (Iriyaguchi-dōri) | |
| Tokyo | Tokyo | 3.9 | 2.4 | Tokyo Metropolitan Route 319 (Iriyaguchi-dōri) – Nezu; Ueno Route – Ginza, Haneda | Ueno Route exit 185 (Iriya) |
| Tokyo | Tokyo | 5.0 | 3.1 | Tokyo Metropolitan Route 462 south (Kokusai-dōri) – Kuramae, Asakusa | |
| Tokyo | Tokyo | 5.2 | 3.2 | Tokyo Metropolitan Route 306 (Meiji-dōri) – Ōji, Kameido | |
| Tokyo | Tokyo | 7.0 | 4.3 | Tokyo Metropolitan Route 461 (Bokutei-dōri) – Nishiarai, Shirahige Bridge | |
| Tokyo | Tokyo | 9.0– 9.5 | 5.6– 5.9 | Frontage road – to Central Circular Route, Tokyo Metropolitan Route 450, Tokyo Metropolitan Route 467 | |
| Tokyo | Tokyo | 10.4 | 6.5 | Tokyo Metropolitan Route 307 / 318 (Kannana-dōri) – Nishiarai, Kameari | |
| Saitama | Sōka | 14.9 | 9.3 | Saitama Prefecture Route 104 – Hatogaya, Yashio | |
| Saitama | Sōka | 17.1 | 10.6 | Saitama Prefecture Route 34 – Saitama, Misato | |
| Saitama | Sōka | 18.5 | 11.5 | National Route 298 – Kawaguchi, Misato; Tokyo Gaikan Expressway – to Tōhoku Expressway, Jōban Expressway, Kan-etsu Expressway | C3 exit 72 (Sōka Interchange) |
| Saitama | Sōka | 18.8 | 11.7 | Saitama Prefecture Route 328 – Hatogaya, Shinden Station | |
| Saitama | Koshigaya | 20.3 | 12.6 | Saitama Prefecture Route 324 – Iwatsuki, Gamō Station | |
| Saitama | Koshigaya | 21.2 | 13.2 | Saitama Prefecture Route 161 south – Hatogaya | Southern end of Saitama Prefecture Route 161 concurrency |
| Saitama | Koshigaya | 21.3 | 13.2 | Saitama Prefecture Route 161 north | Northern end of Saitama Prefecture Route 161 concurrency |
| Saitama | Koshigaya | 24.2 | 15.0 | National Route 463 west (Koshigaya Kaidō) – Urawa; Saitama Prefecture Route 405 east – Kita-Koshigaya Station | |
| Saitama | Koshigaya | 24.6 | 15.3 | National Route 463 west (Koshigaya–Urawa Bypass) – to Tōhoku Expressway, Tokorozawa | |
| Saitama | Koshigaya | 26.2 | 16.3 | Saitama Prefecture Route 325 – Iwatsuki, Central Koshigaya | |
| Saitama | Koshigaya | 27.7 | 17.2 | National Route 4 north (Koshigaya–Kasukabe Bypass) – Utsunomiya, Oyama; Saitama Prefecture Route 49 south – Central Koshigaya | Interchange |
| Saitama | Kasukabe | 31.1 | 19.3 | Saitama Prefecture Route 80 – Iwatsuki, Takesato Station, Matsubushi | |
| Saitama | Kasukabe | 35.2 | 21.9 | Saitama Prefecture Route 2 west – Miyashiro; Saitama Prefecture Route 10 south – Matsubushi | |
| Saitama | Kasukabe | 35.9 | 22.3 | Saitama Prefecture Route 320 north – Sakai | |
| Saitama | Kasukabe | 36.6 | 22.7 | Saitama Prefecture Route 319 – Central Kasukabe, Sakai | |
| Saitama | Kasukabe | 36.8 | 22.9 | National Route 16 – to Tōhoku Expressway, Saitama, Kashiwa | |
| Saitama | Sugito | 40.4 | 25.1 | Saitama Prefecture Route 373 (Kyu-Nikkō Kaidō) north – Tōbu-Dōbutsu-Kōen Station | |
| Saitama | Sugito | 41.4 | 25.7 | Saitama Prefecture Route 154 south – Miyashiro; Saitama Prefecture Route 183 east – Noda | |
| Saitama | Sugito | 42.3 | 26.3 | Saitama Prefecture Route 26 north – Sakai; Saitama Prefecture Route 408 south – Tōbu-Dōbutsu-Kōen Station | |
| Saitama | Satte | 46.1 | 28.6 | Saitama Prefecture Route 318 east – to Ken-Ō Expressway, Koshigaya–Kasukabe Bypass | |
| Saitama | Satte | 48.6 | 30.2 | Saitama Prefecture Route 267 north – Goka | |
| Saitama | Satte | 49.2 | 30.6 | Saitama Prefecture Route 65 (Kyu-Nikkō Kaidō) south – Miyashiro | |
| Saitama | Satte | 49.7 | 30.9 | Saitama Prefecture Route 152 west – Kazuo; Saitama Prefecture Route 371 east – Sakai | |
| Saitama | Kuki | 53.6 | 33.3 | Saitama Prefecture Route 268 east – Goka | |
| Saitama | Kuki | 54.8 | 34.1 | National Route 125 west (Gyōda Bypass) – Gyōda, Kazo; Saitama Prefecture Route 60 west | Interchange; southern end of concurrency with National Route 125 |
| Ibaraki | Goka | 56.7 | 35.2 | Ibaraki Prefecture Route 56 / 228 – Tatebayashi, Shimotsuma | |
| Ibaraki | Koga | 60.3 | 37.5 | National Route 354 – Tatebayashi, Kitakawabe, Jōsō, Sakai | |
| Ibaraki | Koga | 62.6 | 38.9 | National Route 125 east – Shimotsuma; Ibaraki Prefecture Route 294 – Central Koga | Northern end of concurrency with National Route 125 |
| Tochigi | Nogi | 64.3 | 40.0 | Tochigi Prefecture Route 261 (Kyu-Nikkō Kaidō) east – Central Koga | |
| Tochigi | Nogi | 67.5 | 41.9 | Tochigi Prefecture Route 174 north – Tochigi, Fujioka | |
| Tochigi | Nogi | 68.4 | 42.5 | Tochigi Prefecture Route 314 east | |
| Tochigi | Oyama | 71.2 | 44.2 | Tochigi Prefecture Route 50 west – Fujioka | |
| Tochigi | Oyama | 71.5 | 44.4 | Tochigi Prefecture Route 103 east – Mamada Station | |
| Tochigi | Oyama | 71.7 | 44.6 | Tochigi Prefecture Route 190 south | |
| Tochigi | Oyama | 72.5 | 45.0 | Tochigi Prefecture Route 160 west | |
| Tochigi | Oyama | 73.4 | 45.6 | Tochigi Prefecture Route 54 east – to Koshigaya–Kasukabe Bypass | |
| Tochigi | Oyama | 74.9 | 46.5 | Tochigi Prefecture Route 33 west | Southern end of Tochigi Prefecture Route 33 concurrency |
| Tochigi | Oyama | 75.4 | 46.9 | Tochigi Prefecture Route 265 north – Central Oyama | |
| Tochigi | Oyama | 75.9 | 47.2 | Tochigi Prefecture Route 33 east | Northern end of Tochigi Prefecture Route 33 concurrency |
| Tochigi | Oyama | 76.9 | 47.8 | National Route 50 – to Tōhoku Expressway, Ashikaga, Chikusei, Yūki | |
| Tochigi | Oyama | 78.4 | 48.7 | Tochigi Prefecture Route 31 west – Tochigi; Tochigi Prefecture Route 263 east – Oyama Station | |
| Tochigi | Oyama | 81.5 | 50.6 | Tochigi Prefecture Route 18 north – Mibu | |
| Tochigi | Oyama | 81.7 | 50.8 | Tochigi Prefecture Route 265 south – Central Oyama | |
| Tochigi | Oyama | 83.1 | 51.6 | Tochigi Prefecture Route 33 – Tochigi, Yūki | |
| Tochigi | Shimotsuke | 86.0 | 53.4 | Tochigi Prefecture Route 44 east – Ninomiya | Southern end of Tochigi Prefecture Route 44 concurrency |
| Tochigi | Shimotsuke | 87.4 | 54.3 | Tochigi Prefecture Route 44 west – Tochigi | Northern end of Tochigi Prefecture Route 44 concurrency |
| Tochigi | Shimotsuke | 89.0 | 55.3 | Tochigi Prefecture Route 310 east – Jichi Medical University | |
| Tochigi | Shimotsuke | 89.3 | 55.5 | Tochigi Prefecture Route 183 west – Mibu | |
| Tochigi | Shimotsuke | 92.0 | 57.2 | National Route 352 – Kanuma, Mibu, Moka, Kaminokawa | |
| Tochigi | Shimotsuke | 93.0 | 57.8 | Tochigi Prefecture Route 146 east – Kaminokawa | |
| Tochigi | Shimotsuke | 95.1 | 59.1 | Tochigi Prefecture Route 71 –to Kita-Kantō Expressway, Mibu, Central Kaminokawa | |
| Tochigi | Shimotsuke | 96.1 | 59.7 | Tochigi Prefecture Route 71 west – to Kita-Kantō Expressway | |
| Tochigi | Utsunomiya | 98.5 | 61.2 | Tochigi Prefecture Route 193 east | |
| Tochigi | Utsunomiya | 99.1 | 61.6 | Tochigi Prefecture Route 184 west | |
| Tochigi | Utsunomiya | 100.7 | 62.6 | National Route 121 – to Tōhoku Expressway, National Route 4 Bypass, Nikkō | |
| Tochigi | Utsunomiya | 104.4 | 64.9 | National Route 119 west – Central Utsunomiya | |
| Tochigi | Utsunomiya | 105.4 | 65.5 | Tochigi Prefecture Route 35 (Kaminokawa Kaidō) – Kaminokawa | |
| Tochigi | Utsunomiya | 106.2 | 66.0 | Tochigi Prefecture Route 46 (Heisei-dōri) – to Tōhoku Expressway, Kanuma, Moka | |
| Tochigi | Utsunomiya | 108.4 | 67.4 | National Route 123 east / Tochigi Prefecture Route 1 – Utsunomiya City Office, Motegi, Mashiko | |
| Tochigi | Utsunomiya | 109.1 | 67.8 | Tochigi Prefecture Route 64 (Kinu-dōri) – Utsunomiya Station, Motegi, Haga | Interchange |
| Tochigi | Utsunomiya | 111.4 | 69.2 | Tochigi Prefecture Route 10 south – Central Utsunomiya | Southern end of Tochigi Prefecture Route 10 concurrency |
| Tochigi | Utsunomiya | 113.4 | 70.5 | National Route 4 south (Utsunomiya Ring Road) – Kasukabe, Oyama; National Route 119 west (Utsunomiya Ring Road) – Tōhoku Expressway, Nikkō | |
| Tochigi | Utsunomiya | 115.3 | 71.6 | Tochigi Prefecture Route 158 south (Tatsu Kaidō) – Kaminokawa | |
| Tochigi | Takanezawa | 117.9 | 73.3 | National Route 408 south – Moka; Tochigi Prefecture Route 10 east – Nasukarasuyama | Northern end of Tochigi Prefecture Route 10 concurrency |
| Tochigi | Sakura | 124.4 | 77.3 | Tochigi Prefecture Route 125 south (Ōshū Kaidō) – Shirasawa | |
| Tochigi | Sakura | 124.7 | 77.5 | National Route 293 east – Nakagawa, Kitsuregawa | Southern end of National Route 293 concurrency |
| Tochigi | Sakura | 125.5 | 78.0 | National Route 293 west – Kanuma | Northern end of National Route 293 concurrency |
| Tochigi | Sakura | 126.5 | 78.6 | Tochigi Prefecture Route 62 west – Tamanyu | |
| Tochigi | Sakura | 126.7 | 78.7 | Tochigi Prefecture Route 181 south – Sakura City Office | |
| Tochigi | Sakura | 129.4 | 80.4 | Tochigi Prefecture Route 353 north – Kamasusaka Station | |
| Tochigi | Sakura | 130.6 | 81.2 | Tochigi Prefecture Route 180 – Tamanyu, Kitsuregawa | |
| Tochigi | Yaita | 133.6 | 83.0 | Tochigi Prefecture Route 353 south – Otsuhata | |
| Tochigi | Yaita | 134.0 | 83.3 | Tochigi Prefecture Route 74 – Kataoka Station, Kitsuregawa | |
| Tochigi | Yaita | 134.8 | 83.8 | Tōhoku Expressway – Tokyo, Fukushima | E4 exit 11 (Yaita Interchange) |
| Tochigi | Yaita | 138.2 | 85.9 | Tochigi Prefecture Route 25 east – Nasukarasuyama | |
| Tochigi | Yaita | 139.7 | 86.8 | National Route 461 west – Nikkō, Kinugawa | Southern end of National Route 461 concurrency |
| Tochigi | Yaita | 141.7 | 88.0 | Tochigi Prefecture Route 271 south – Central Yaita | |
| Tochigi | Ōtawara | 143.2 | 89.0 | National Route 461 east – Kurobane, Ōtawara | Northern end of National Route 461 concurrency; partial interchange |
| Tochigi | Ōtawara | 143.7 | 89.3 | Tochigi Prefecture Route 306 north – Central Yaita | |
| Tochigi | Ōtawara | 145.7 | 90.5 | Tochigi Prefecture Route 185 north – Sekiya | |
| Tochigi | Nasushiobara | 149.7 | 93.0 | National Route 400 – to Tōhoku Expressway, National Route 461, Shiobara, Ōtawara | |
| Tochigi | Nasushiobara | 156.0 | 96.9 | Tochigi Prefecture Route 53 – to Tōhoku Expressway, Nasushiobara Station, Ōtawara | |
| Tochigi | Nasushiobara | 156.8 | 97.4 | Tochigi Prefecture Route 182 east – Kurobane | |
| Tochigi | Nasushiobara | 157.9 | 98.1 | Tochigi Prefecture Route 303 north – Central Nasushiobara | |
| Tochigi | Nasushiobara | 157.9 | 98.1 | Tochigi Prefecture Route 303 north – Central Nasushiobara | |
| Tochigi | Nasushiobara | 160.5 | 99.7 | Tochigi Prefecture Route 34 – Kurobane, Kuroiso Station | Interchange |
| Tochigi | Nasu | 162.9 | 101.2 | Tochigi Prefecture Route 178 | Half-diamond interchange; northbound exit, southbound entrance |
| Tochigi | Nasu | 163.8 | 101.8 | Tochigi Prefecture Route 211 – Kurodahara, Central Nasushiobara | Interchange |
| Tochigi | Nasu | 164.8 | 102.4 | Tochigi Prefecture Route 17 – to Tōhoku Expressway, Nasu Kogen | Interchange; northbound exit, southbound entrance |
| Tochigi | Nasu | 165.3 | 102.7 | Tochigi Prefecture Route 303 south – Nasu Kogen | |
| Tochigi | Nasu | 173.3 | 107.7 | Tochigi Prefecture Route 21 west – Nasu Kogen; Tochigi Prefecture Route 28 east – Kurodahara | |
| Tochigi | Nasu | 174.9 | 108.7 | Tochigi Prefecture Route 349 west – to Tōhoku Expressway | |
| Tochigi | Nasu | 175.5 | 109.1 | Tochigi Prefecture Route 305 north – Nasuyumoto | |
| Tochigi | Nasu | 178.7 | 111.0 | Tochigi Prefecture Route 105 south – Toyohara Station | |
| Fukushima | Nishigō | 182.8 | 113.6 | Fukushima Prefecture Route 68 west – Nasu | |
| Fukushima | Nishigō | 183.4 | 114.0 | Fukushima Prefecture Route 281 north – Mafune; Fukushima Prefecture Route 184 east – Shirasaka | |
| Fukushima | Nishigō | 184.6 | 114.7 | Tōhoku Expressway – Utsunomiya, Fukushima | E4 exit 14 (Shirakawa Interchange) |
| Fukushima | Shirakawa | 187.3 | 116.4 | National Route 289 – Shimogō, Tanagura | One-quadrant interchange |
| Fukushima | Shirakawa | 188.1 | 116.9 | Fukushima Prefecture Route 37 – Central Shirakawa, Lake Hatori | |
| Fukushima | Shirakawa | 190.2 | 118.2 | National Route 294 north – to Tōhoku Expressway, Aizuwakamatsu, Taishin | Southern end of National Route 294 concurrency |
| Fukushima | Shirakawa | 190.9 | 118.6 | National Route 294 south – Ogawa, Central Shirakawa | Northern end of National Route 294 concurrency |
| Fukushima | Shirakawa | 191.9 | 119.2 | Fukushima Prefecture Route 185 east – Kutano | |
| Fukushima | Izumizaki | 197.4 | 122.7 | Fukushima Prefecture Route 75 south – Tanagura, Izumizaki Village Office | |
| Fukushima | Yabuki | 200.3 | 124.5 | Tōhoku Expressway – Utsunomiya, Fukushima; Abukuma Kōgen Road east – Fukushima Airport | E4 exit 15 / E80 exit 1 (Yabuki Interchange) |
| Fukushima | Yabuki | 200.9 | 124.8 | Fukushima Prefecture Route 283 east | |
| Fukushima | Yabuki | 202.5 | 125.8 | Fukushima Prefecture Route 44 south – to National Route 294, Taishin; Fukushima Prefecture Route 58 east – to Fukushima Airport, National Route 118, Tanagura | |
| Fukushima | Yabuki | 203.2 | 126.3 | Fukushima Prefecture Route 186 east – Yabuki Station | |
| Fukushima | Yabuki | 204.1 | 126.8 | Fukushima Prefecture Route 55 north – Naganuma | |
| Fukushima | Kagamiishi | 208.1 | 129.3 | Fukushima Prefecture Route 288 east | |
| Fukushima | Kagamiishi | 209.1 | 129.9 | Fukushima Prefecture Route 289 – Ten-ei, Central Kagamiishi | |
| Fukushima | Sukagawa | 212.0 | 131.7 | National Route 118 – to Fukushima Airport, Aizuwakamatsu, Mito | Interchange |
| Fukushima | Sukagawa | 213.6 | 132.7 | Fukushima Prefecture Route 63 – Aizuwakamatsu, Sukagawa City Hall | |
| Fukushima | Sukagawa | 219.3 | 136.3 | Fukushima Prefecture Route 17 north (Showa-dōri) – to National Route 49, National Route 288, Miharu, Iwaki, Central Kōriyama | |
| Fukushima | Kōriyama | 219.9 | 136.6 | Fukushima Prefecture Route 109 – Naganuma, Asakanagamori | |
| Fukushima | Kōriyama | 222.8 | 138.4 | Fukushima Prefecture Route 47 – to Tōhoku Expressway, Asaka-Nagamori Station, Naganuma | Interchange |
| Fukushima | Kōriyama | 224.1 | 139.2 | Fukushima Prefecture Route 143 | |
| Fukushima | Kōriyama | 225.4 | 140.1 | Fukushima Prefecture Route 6 – Ōtsuki, Central Kōriyama, Konan | Interchange |
| Fukushima | Kōriyama | 227.8 | 141.5 | National Route 49 – to Tōhoku Expressway, Iwaki, Aizuwakamatsu | Interchange |
| Fukushima | Kōriyama | 230.0 | 142.9 | Fukushima Prefecture Route 296 – Kikuta, Central Kōriyama | Partial cloverleaf interchange |
| Fukushima | Kōriyama | 232.7 | 144.6 | National Route 288 east – to National Route 49, Iwaki, Miharu, Central Kōriyama | |
| Fukushima | Kōriyama | 233.0 | 144.8 | Fukushima Prefecture Route 357 – Kikuta, Hiwada Station | |
| Fukushima | Motomiya | 237.0 | 147.3 | Fukushima Prefecture Route 304 – Ōtama | |
| Fukushima | Motomiya | 237.5 | 147.6 | Tōhoku Expressway – to Ban-etsu Expressway, Tokyo, Utsunomiya, Sendai | E4 exit 19 (Motomiya Interchange) |
| Fukushima | Motomiya | 241.2 | 149.9 | Fukushima Prefecture Route 146 – Ōtama, Miharu, Shirasawa | One-quadrant interchange |
| Fukushima | Ōtama | 243.4 | 151.2 | Fukushima Prefecture Route 30 – Ōtama Village Office, Dake Onsen | |
| Fukushima | Nihonmatsu | 246.4 | 153.1 | Fukushima Prefecture Route 368 west | |
| Fukushima | Nihonmatsu | 247.2 | 153.6 | Fukushima Prefecture Route 355 – Central Nihonmatsu | Partial interchange |
| Fukushima | Nihonmatsu | 249.1 | 154.8 | National Route 459 west – to Tōhoku Expressway, Dake Onsen, Central Nihonmatsu | Interchange; southern end of National Route 459 concurrency |
| Fukushima | Nihonmatsu | 249.7 | 155.2 | Fukushima Prefecture Route 129 north – Central Nihonmatsu | |
| Fukushima | Nihonmatsu | 251.0 | 156.0 | National Route 459 east – Namie, Iwashiro | Interchange; northern end of National Route 459 concurrency |
| Fukushima | Nihonmatsu | 252.2 | 156.7 | Fukushima Prefecture Route 355 south – Central Nihonmatsu | |
| Fukushima | Nihonmatsu | 252.4 | 156.8 | Fukushima Prefecture Route 62 east – Tōwa | |
| Fukushima | Nihonmatsu | 253.0 | 157.2 | Fukushima Prefecture Route 114 north – to Tōhoku Expressway, Adachi Station | |
| Fukushima | Nihonmatsu | 257.0 | 159.7 | Fukushima Prefecture Route 129 south – Adachi; Fukushima Prefecture Route 39 east – Kawamata, Iino | Two-quadrant interchange |
| Fukushima | Fukushima | 259.7 | 161.4 | Fukushima Prefecture Route 51 east – Kawamata; Fukushima Prefecture Route 52 west – Matsukawa Station | Interchange |
| Fukushima | Fukushima | 261.5 | 162.5 | Fukushima Prefecture Route 307 – Fukushima University, Kawamata, Iino | Interchange |
| Fukushima | Fukushima | 264.7 | 164.5 | Fukushima Prefecture Route 114 south – Fukushima University | Interchange |
| Fukushima | Fukushima | 268.6 | 166.9 | National Route 13 north (Fukushima West Bypass) – Yonezawa, Yamagata | |
| Fukushima | Fukushima | 269.9 | 167.7 | National Route 115 west – to Tōhoku Expressway, Fukushima West Bypass, Inawashiro, Tsuchiyu Onsen | Southern end of National Route 115 concurrency |
| Fukushima | Fukushima | 270.3 | 168.0 | Fukushima Prefecture Route 309 north – Tenjin Bridge | |
| Fukushima | Fukushima | 271.6 | 168.8 | National Route 13 north (Heiwa-dōri) – Fukushima Station, Yonezawa, Yamagata | |
| Fukushima | Fukushima | 272.1 | 169.1 | National Route 114 east (Bansechō-dōri) – Kawamata | |
| Fukushima | Fukushima | 274.0 | 170.3 | National Route 115 east – Sōma | Northern end of National Route 115 concurrency |
| Fukushima | Fukushima | 276.9 | 172.1 | Fukushima Prefecture Route 387 – to Tōhoku Expressway, Tōhoku-Chūō Expressway, National Route 13, Hobara | |
| Fukushima | Fukushima | 277.2 | 172.2 | Fukushima Prefecture Route 353 north – Senoue | |
| Fukushima | Fukushima | 278.0 | 172.7 | Fukushima Prefecture Route 155 west – Iizaka Onsen | |
| Fukushima | Date | 279.9 | 173.9 | National Route 399 – Iizaka, Hobara | |
| Fukushima | Date | 281.9 | 175.2 | Fukushima Prefecture Route 125 south – Hobara | |
| Fukushima | Koori | 283.0 | 175.8 | Fukushima Prefecture Route 125 west – Iizaka | |
| Fukushima | Koori | 283.4 | 176.1 | Fukushima Prefecture Route 123 east – Yanagawa | |
| Fukushima | Kunimi | 288.0 | 179.0 | Fukushima Prefecture Route 46 north – to Tōhoku Expressway | |
| Fukushima | Kunimi | 288.2 | 179.1 | Fukushima Prefecture Route 31 south – Yanagawa | |
| Fukushima | Kunimi | 288.8 | 179.5 | Fukushima Prefecture Route 107 west – Central Kunimi; Fukushima Prefecture Route 320 east – Yanagawa | |
| Fukushima | Kunimi | 292.7 | 181.9 | Fukushima Prefecture Route 321 south – Yanagawa | |
| Miyagi | Shiroishi | 296.9 | 184.5 | Miyagi Prefecture Route 105 east – Kakuda | |
| Miyagi | Shiroishi | 304.7 | 189.3 | Miyagi Prefecture Route 24 east – Marumori, Shiroishi-Zaō Station | |
| Miyagi | Shiroishi | 305.5 | 189.8 | National Route 113 – Nan'yō, Shichikashuku, Kakuda, Central Shiroishi | Interchange |
| Miyagi | Shiroishi | 306.3 | 190.3 | Miyagi Prefecture Route 254 – Central Shiroishi, Kamasaki Onsen | One-quadrant interchange |
| Miyagi | Shiroishi | 308.1 | 191.4 | National Route 457 north – Zaō | |
| Miyagi | Shiroishi | 308.4 | 191.6 | Miyagi Prefecture Route 12 south – Central Shiroishi | Southern end of Miyagi Prefecture Route 12 concurrency |
| Miyagi | Shiroishi | 310.2 | 192.7 | Tōhoku Expressway – Fukushima, Sendai, Yamagata | E4 exit 24 (Shiroishi Interchange) |
| Miyagi | Zaō | 311.4 | 193.5 | Miyagi Prefecture Route 12 north – Zaō Echo Line | Northern end of Miyagi Prefecture Route 12 concurrency |
| Miyagi | Zaō | 312.8 | 194.4 | Miyagi Prefecture Route 25 east – Zaō Echo Line | |
| Miyagi | Zaō | 315.4 | 196.0 | Miyagi Prefecture Route 112 south – Kita-Shirakawa Station | |
| Miyagi | Ōgawara | 318.2 | 197.7 | Miyagi Prefecture Route 110 south – Kakuda, Funaoka; Miyagi Prefecture Route 115 west – Zaō | Southern end of Miyagi Prefecture Route 115 concurrency |
| Miyagi | Ōgawara | 319.4 | 198.5 | Miyagi Prefecture Route 115 east – Central Ōgawara | Northern end of Miyagi Prefecture Route 115 concurrency |
| Miyagi | Ōgawara | 320.3 | 199.0 | Miyagi Prefecture Route 14 – to Tōhoku Expressway, Murata, Central Ōgawara | |
| Miyagi | Shibata | 323.5 | 201.0 | Miyagi Prefecture Route 116 south – Kakuda, Funaoka Station | |
| Miyagi | Shibata | 324.6 | 201.7 | Miyagi Prefecture Route 114 south – Kakuda | |
| Miyagi | Shibata | 327.2 | 203.3 | National Route 349 south – Marumori, Kakuda | Interchange |
| Miyagi | Shibata | 328.4 | 204.1 | Miyagi Prefecture Route 28 – Tsukinoki, Watari | Interchange |
| Miyagi | Iwanuma | 330.5 | 205.4 | Miyagi Prefecture Route 39 north – Moniwa | |
| Miyagi | Iwanuma | 333.2 | 207.0 | National Route 6 south – Minamisōma, Sōma | Southern end of National Route 6 concurrency |
| Miyagi | Iwanuma | 334.3 | 207.7 | Miyagi Prefecture Route 125 east – to Sendai-Tōbu Road | Interchange |
| Miyagi | Natori | 334.9 | 208.1 | Miyagi Prefecture Route 25 west – Central Iwanuma | |
| Miyagi | Natori | 337.7 | 209.8 | Miyagi Prefecture Route 20 – to Sendai Airport, Sendai-Tōbu Road | Interchange |
| Miyagi | Natori | 338.1 | 210.1 | Miyagi Prefecture Route 258 – Nagamachi, Medeshima | |
| Miyagi | Natori | 340.8 | 211.8 | Miyagi Prefecture Route 127 – Mitazono Station, Morisekinoshita Station | |
| Miyagi | Natori | 341.6 | 212.3 | Miyagi Prefecture Route 129 – to Sendai-Tōbu Road, Natori Station, Yuriage | |
| Miyagi | Sendai | 348.1 | 216.3 | Miyagi Prefecture Route 54 – Kawaramachi, Ido-hama | |
| Miyagi | Sendai | 350.5 | 217.8 | Miyagi Prefecture Route 235 – Minamikoizumi, Arahama | |
| Miyagi | Sendai | 351.4 | 218.3 | Miyagi Prefecture Route 137 – Sendai Station, Sendai Port | |
| Miyagi | Sendai | 353.7 | 219.8 | National Route 6 west / National Route 47; National Route 45 – to Sanriku Expressway, Prefecture Office, City Office, Shiogama | Nigatake Interchange; northern end of National Route 6 concurrency, southern end of National Route 47 concurrency |
| Miyagi | Sendai | 358.7 | 222.9 | Miyagi Prefecture Route 37 west – Yaotome, Nankodai | |
| Miyagi | Sendai | 359.6 | 223.4 | Miyagi Prefecture Route 35 – Izumi-Chūō, Iwakiri | |
| Miyagi | Sendai | 360.9 | 224.3 | Miyagi Prefecture Route 56 north – Nishinarita | |
| Miyagi | Sendai | 361.3 | 224.5 | Miyagi Prefecture Route 22 south – Sendai Station, Izumi-Chūō | |
| Miyagi | Sendai | 362.3 | 225.1 | Tōhoku Expressway – to Yamagata Expressway, Fukushima, Tokyo, Aomori, Morioka | E4 exit 29 (Izumi Interchange) |
| Miyagi | Sendai | 363.4 | 225.8 | Miyagi Prefecture Route 263 west – Izumi Park Town | |
| Miyagi | Tomiya | 367.4 | 228.3 | Sendai-Hokubu Road east – Ishinomaki, Sōma | E6 exit 2 (Tomiya Interchange) |
| Miyagi | Tomiya | 369.0 | 229.3 | Miyagi Prefecture Route 256 – Miyatoko, Nishinarita | |
| Miyagi | Taiwa | 373.1 | 231.8 | Miyagi Prefecture Route 9 east – Matsushima, Sendai Hokubu Industrial Park | |
| Miyagi | Taiwa | 373.9 | 232.3 | Miyagi Prefecture Route 3 south – to Tōhoku Expressway, Matsushima; Miyagi Prefecture Route 147 west – Masuzawa | |
| Miyagi | Ōhira | 374.7 | 232.8 | Miyagi Prefecture Route 261 north – Ishinomaki, Sendai Hokubu Industrial Park | |
| Miyagi | Ōhira | 375.7 | 233.4 | National Route 457 – Kami | |
| Miyagi | Ōhira | 376.9 | 234.2 | Miyagi Prefecture Route 57 east – to Tōhoku Expressway, Sendai Hokubu Industrial Park | |
| Miyagi | Ōhira | 380.2 | 236.2 | Miyagi Prefecture Route 16 – Kami, Kashimadai | |
| Miyagi | Ōsaki | 384.6 | 239.0 | Miyagi Prefecture Route 156 west – Kami | |
| Miyagi | Ōsaki | 387.3 | 240.7 | Miyagi Prefecture Route 56 south – to Tōhoku Expressway, Iga | |
| Miyagi | Ōsaki | 388.3 | 241.3 | Miyagi Prefecture Route 157 – Central Sanbongi, Kami | Northbound entrance, southbound exit |
| Miyagi | Ōsaki | 389.2 | 241.8 | Miyagi Prefecture Route 152 east – Central Sanbongi | |
| Miyagi | Ōsaki | 393.0 | 244.2 | Miyagi Prefecture Route 158 west – to National Route 347, Obanazawa, Kami | |
| Miyagi | Ōsaki | 393.8 | 244.7 | National Route 347 west – Obanazawa, Kami; Miyagi Prefecture Route 1 north – Central Furukawa | |
| Miyagi | Ōsaki | 395.0 | 245.4 | National Route 47 west / National Route 108 – to Tōhoku Expressway, Shinjo, Naruko Onsen, Ishinomaki, Wakuya, Central Furukawa | Northern end of National Route 47 concurrency |
| Miyagi | Ōsaki | 398.6 | 247.7 | Miyagi Prefecture Route 1 south – Central Furukawa | Southern end of Miyagi Prefecture Route 1 concurrency |
| Miyagi | Ōsaki | 400.0 | 248.5 | Miyagi Prefecture Route 165 west – Iwadeyama | |
| Miyagi | Ōsaki | 400.3 | 248.7 | Miyagi Prefecture Route 266 north – to Tōhoku Expressway, Iwadeyama | |
| Miyagi | Ōsaki | 402.0 | 249.8 | Miyagi Prefecture Route 166 west – Ichihasama | |
| Miyagi | Kurihara | 403.1 | 250.5 | Miyagi Prefecture Route 1 north – Misato, Central Takashimizu | Northern end of Miyagi Prefecture Route 1 concurrency |
| Miyagi | Kurihara | 405.6 | 252.0 | Miyagi Prefecture Route 167 – Naruko Onsen, Iwadeyama, Motoyoshi, Semine | Two-quadrant interchange |
| Miyagi | Kurihara | 411.2 | 255.5 | Tōhoku Expressway – Sendai, Tokyo, Morioka, Aomori | E4 exit 32 (Tsukidate Interchange) |
| Miyagi | Kurihara | 412.2 | 256.1 | Miyagi Prefecture Route 36 east – Tome, Wakayanagi | |
| Miyagi | Kurihara | 413.1 | 256.7 | National Route 4 north (Tsukidate Bypass) – Tome | |
| Miyagi | Kurihara | 414.8 | 257.7 | National Route 398 – Hanayama, Ichihasama, Wakayanagi, Shiwahime, Izunuma-Uchinuma | |
| Miyagi | Kurihara | 416.5 | 258.8 | Miyagi Prefecture Route 42 north – Kurikoma Quasi-National Park | |
| Miyagi | Kurihara | 423.4 | 263.1 | Miyagi Prefecture Route 181 west – Hanayama, Uguisuzawa | |
| Miyagi | Kurihara | 423.7 | 263.3 | Miyagi Prefecture Route 4 west – Kurikoma | Southern end of Miyagi Prefecture Route 4 concurrency |
| Miyagi | Kurihara | 424.7 | 263.9 | Miyagi Prefecture Route 4 east – to Tōhoku Expressway, Wakayanagi | Northern end of Miyagi Prefecture Route 4 concurrency |
| Miyagi | Kurihara | 425.0 | 264.1 | Miyagi Prefecture Route 186 west – Kurikoma | Southern end of Miyagi Prefecture Route 186 concurrency |
| Miyagi | Kurihara | 426.0 | 264.7 | Miyagi Prefecture Route 186 east – Hanaizumi | Northern end of Miyagi Prefecture Route 186 concurrency |
| Miyagi | Kurihara | 429.1 | 266.6 | Miyagi Prefecture Route 48 east – Hanaizumi | |
| Miyagi | Kurihara | 431.0 | 267.8 | Miyagi Prefecture Route 182 west – Kurikoma | |
| Miyagi | Kurihara | 434.6 | 270.0 | Miyagi Prefecture Route 187 east – Hanaizumi, Arikabe Station | |
| Iwate | Ichinoseki | 436.0 | 270.9 | Iwate Prefecture Route 260 north – Central Ichinoseki | |
| Iwate | Ichinoseki | 440.1 | 273.5 | National Route 284 east – Central Ichinoseki; National Route 457 south – Kurikoma | |
| Iwate | Ichinoseki | 441.3 | 274.2 | National Route 342 east – to National Route 284, Kesennuma | Southern end of National Route 342 concurrency |
| Iwate | Ichinoseki | 442.0 | 274.6 | National Route 342 west – to Tōhoku Expressway, Yokote; Iwate Prefecture Route 14 north – Rikuzentakata, Higashiyama | Northern end of National Route 342 concurrency |
| Iwate | Hiraizumi | 445.9 | 277.1 | Iwate Prefecture Route 260 south – Central Ichinoseki | |
| Iwate | Hiraizumi | 446.3 | 277.3 | Iwate Prefecture Route 300 north – Hiraizumi, Chūson-ji, Mōtsū-ji | |
| Iwate | Hiraizumi | 448.3 | 278.6 | Iwate Prefecture Route 206 – Hiraizumi, Higashiyama | |
| Iwate | Hiraizumi | 451.6 | 280.6 | Iwate Prefecture Route 37 – Koromagawa, Hiraizumi; Iwate Prefecture Route 237 north – Higashiyama | |
| Iwate | Hiraizumi | 452.0 | 280.9 | Tōhoku Expressway – Tokyo, Sendai, Aomori, Morioka | E4 exit 35 (Hiraizumi-Maesawa Interchange) |
| Iwate | Ōshū | 454.0 | 282.1 | Iwate Prefecture Route 243 north – Central Maesawa | |
| Iwate | Ōshū | 455.4 | 283.0 | Iwate Prefecture Route 237 – Maesawa Station, Higashiyama | |
| Iwate | Ōshū | 457.2 | 284.1 | Iwate Prefecture Route 106 – Central Maesawa, Higashiyama | |
| Iwate | Ōshū | 458.7 | 285.0 | Iwate Prefecture Route 243 south – Central Maesawa | |
| Iwate | Ōshū | 461.1 | 286.5 | Iwate Prefecture Route 175 east – Rikuchū-Orii Station; Iwate Prefecture Route 176 west – to Tōhoku Expressway, Isawa | |
| Iwate | Ōshū | 464.7 | 288.8 | Iwate Prefecture Route 226 north – Central Mizusawa | |
| Iwate | Ōshū | 465.8 | 289.4 | National Route 343 east – Rikuzaentakata, Daito | |
| Iwate | Ōshū | 466.4 | 289.8 | National Route 397 – Yokote, Ōfunato | |
| Iwate | Ōshū | 468.2 | 290.9 | Iwate Prefecture Route 251 north (Shiushi-dōri) – Esashi | |
| Iwate | Ōshū | 468.7 | 291.2 | Iwate Prefecture Route 8 east – Esashi; Iwate Prefecture Route 226 south – Central Mizusawa | |
| Iwate | Ōshū | 470.2 | 292.2 | National Route 4 south (Mizusawa-higashi Bypass) – Sumita, Esashi; Iwate Prefecture Route 270 north – Kanegasaki | Interchange |
| Iwate | Ōshū | 472.1 | 293.3 | Tōhoku Expressway – to Akita Expressway, Tokyo, Sendai, Aomori, Morioka | E4 exit 36 (Mizusawa Interchange) |
| Iwate | Kanegasaki | 473.9 | 294.5 | Iwate Prefecture Route 196 – Iwate Chubu Industrial Area, Central Kanegasaki, Kanegasaki Station | |
| Iwate | Kanegasaki | 475.2 | 295.3 | Iwate Prefecture Route 270 south – Central Kanegasaki | |
| Iwate | Kanegasaki | 476.5 | 296.1 | Iwate Prefecture Route 255 east – Esashi | |
| Iwate | Kitakami | 477.8 | 296.9 | Iwate Prefecture Route 159 west | |
| Iwate | Kitakami | 478.5 | 297.3 | Iwate Prefecture Route 50 west – to Tōhoku Expressway; Iwate Prefecture Route 254 north – Central Kitakami | |
| Iwate | Kitakami | 482.7 | 299.9 | Iwate Prefecture Route 225 – Geto Onsen, Esashi | |
| Iwate | Kitakami | 484.9 | 301.3 | National Route 107 – to Tōhoku Expressway, Yokote, Ōfunato | |
| Iwate | Kitakami | 487.2 | 302.7 | Iwate Prefecture Route 254 south – Central Kitakami | |
| Iwate | Kitakami | 488.5 | 303.5 | Iwate Prefecture Route 151 east – Murasakino Station | |
| Iwate | Kitakami | 489.8 | 304.3 | Iwate Prefecture Route 252 west | |
| Iwate | Hanamaki | 492.9 | 306.3 | Iwate Prefecture Route 298 north – to Tōhoku Expressway, Central Hanamaki | |
| Iwate | Hanamaki | 496.1 | 308.3 | Iwate Prefecture Route 28 – Central Hanamaki, Higashijunichome | |
| Iwate | Hanamaki | 496.9 | 308.8 | National Route 283 / Iwate Prefecture Route 12 west – to Tōhoku Expressway, Central Hanamaki, Kamaishi, Tōno, Kenji Miyazawa Museum | |
| Iwate | Hanamaki | 499.6 | 310.4 | Kamaishi Expressway – to Tōhoku Expressway, Kamaishi, Tōno; Iwate Prefecture Route 294 north – Hanamaki Airport, Hanamaki Distribution Center | E46 exit 1 (Hanamaki Airport Interchange) |
| Iwate | Hanamaki | 500.4 | 310.9 | Iwate Prefecture Route 286 – Hanamaki Airport, Shin-Hanamaki Station, Central Hanamaki, Tōwa | |
| Iwate | Hanamaki | 503.0 | 312.5 | Iwate Prefecture Route 37 south – to Tōhoku Expressway, Dai Onsen, Hanamaki Onsen | |
| Iwate | Hanamaki | 503.5 | 312.9 | Iwate Prefecture Route 213 west – Hanamaki-Kūkō Station; Iwate Prefecture Route 214 east – Hanamaki Airport, Ōhasama | |
| Iwate | Hanamaki | 506.3 | 314.6 | Iwate Prefecture Route 265 north – Central Ishidoriya | |
| Iwate | Hanamaki | 509.1 | 316.3 | Iwate Prefecture Route 109 – Ishidoriya Station | |
| Iwate | Hanamaki | 510.3 | 317.1 | Iwate Prefecture Route 102 east – Ōhasama | |
| Iwate | Hanamaki | 510.9 | 317.5 | Iwate Prefecture Route 198 north | |
| Iwate | Shiwa | 512.2 | 318.3 | Iwate Prefecture Route 265 south – Central Ishidoriya | |
| Iwate | Shiwa | 515.4 | 320.3 | Iwate Prefecture Route 111 west | |
| Iwate | Shiwa | 515.8 | 320.5 | Iwate Prefecture Route 46 west – to Tōhoku Expressway | |
| Iwate | Shiwa | 517.1 | 321.3 | Iwate Prefecture Route 25 east – to National Route 456 | Kōriyama Castle, just north of the interchange |
| Iwate | Yahaba | 523.9 | 325.5 | Iwate Prefecture Route 207 west – Yahaba Station; Iwate Prefecture Route 208 east – Tōno | |
| Iwate | Morioka | 529.1 | 328.8 | National Route 46 west / Iwate Prefecture Route 36 – to Tōhoku Expressway, National Route 396, Tōno | |
| Iwate | Morioka | 530.3 | 329.5 | Iwate Prefecture Route 16 north (Morioka Belt Highway) – Morioka Station, Prefecture Office | |
| Iwate | Morioka | 531.9 | 330.5 | National Route 396 south – Tōno | |
| Iwate | Morioka | 533.2 | 331.3 | National Route 106 – Morioka Station, Prefecture Office, Miyako | |
| Iwate | Morioka | 535.9 | 333.0 | National Route 455 – Prefecture Office, Iwaizumi | One-quadrant interchange |
| Iwate | Morioka | 536.6 | 333.4 | National Route 455 east (Kitayama Bypass) – Iwaizumi | |
| Iwate | Morioka | 537.5 | 334.0 | National Route 281 east / National Route 282 north | Southern end of concurrency with National Routes 281 and 282 |
| Iwate | Morioka | 539.2 | 335.0 | Iwate Prefecture Route 220 south – Morioka Station, Prefecture Office | |
| Iwate | Takizawa | 546.6 | 339.6 | National Route 282 north (Ippongi Bypass) – Hachimantai; Iwate Prefecture Route 16 (Morioka Belt Highway) – Koiwai | Northern end of National Route 282 concurrency |
| Iwate | Takizawa | 547.3 | 340.1 | Tōhoku Expressway – to Hachinohe Expressway, Sendai, Tokyo, Aomori | E4 exit 43 (Takizawa Interchange) |
| Iwate | Morioka | 553.3 | 343.8 | Iwate Prefecture Route 169 south – Iwaizumi; Iwate Prefecture Route 301 north – Tamayama Branch Office | |
| Iwate | Morioka | 558.5 | 347.0 | Iwate Prefecture Route 129 west – Hachimantai | |
| Iwate | Iwate | 562.7 | 349.6 | Iwate Prefecture Route 157 north – Iwate-Kawaguchi Station | |
| Iwate | Iwate | 569.3 | 353.7 | Iwate Prefecture Route 17 – Hachimantai, Numakunai | |
| Iwate | Iwate | 572.6 | 355.8 | National Route 281 east – Kuji, Kuzumaki | Northern end of National Route 281 concurrency |
| Iwate | Ichinohe | 582.1 | 361.7 | Iwate Prefecture Route 30 – Ashiro, Kuzumaki, Oku-nakayama kōgen Station | |
| Iwate | Ichinohe | 596.1 | 370.4 | Iwate Prefecture Route 101 north – Kozuya Station | |
| Iwate | Ichinohe | 598.3 | 371.8 | Iwate Prefecture Route 15 south – Kuzumaki, Kozuya Station | |
| Iwate | Ichinohe | 600.2 | 372.9 | Iwate Prefecture Route 274 north – Ichinohe Hospital, Ichinohe Town Office | |
| Iwate | Ichinohe | 602.8 | 374.6 | Iwate Prefecture Route 274 south – Central Ichinohe | Southern end of Iwate Prefecture Route 274 concurrency |
| Iwate | Ichinohe | 604.6 | 375.7 | Hachinohe Expressway – Morioka, Aomori, Hachinohe | E4A exit 2 (Ichinohe Interchange) |
| Iwate | Ichinohe | 604.8 | 375.8 | Iwate Prefecture Route 5 east – Kunohe | |
| Iwate | Ichinohe | 608.3 | 378.0 | Iwate Prefecture Route 6 south – Ashiro, Jōbōji | Southern end of Iwate Prefecture Route 6 concurrency |
| Iwate | Ichinohe | 608.8 | 378.3 | Iwate Prefecture Route 274 north – Central Ninohe | Northern end of Iwate Prefecture Route 274 concurrency |
| Iwate | Ninohe | 610.1 | 379.1 | Iwate Prefecture Route 6 north – Ninohe Station | Northern end of Iwate Prefecture Route 6 concurrency |
| Iwate | Ninohe | 611.4 | 379.9 | Iwate Prefecture Route 6 south – Ninohe Station | |
| Iwate | Ninohe | 612.1 | 380.3 | Iwate Prefecture Route 24 east – Central Ninohe | |
| Iwate | Ninohe | 613.6 | 381.3 | Iwate Prefecture Route 32 – Takko, Ninohe Industrial Estate, Central Ninohe, Tomai Station | One-quadrant interchange |
| Iwate | Ninohe | 616.1 | 382.8 | Iwate Prefecture Route 274 south – Central Ninohe | |
| Iwate | Ninohe | 617.5 | 383.7 | National Route 395 east – Kuji, Karumai | |
| Iwate | Ninohe | 619.2 | 384.8 | Iwate Prefecture Route 244 east – Kintaichi-Onsen Station | |
| Iwate | Ninohe | 621.9 | 386.4 | Iwate Prefecture Route 241 west – Kamitomai | |
| Aomori | Sannohe | 622.8 | 387.0 | Aomori Prefecture Route 149 east – Metoki Station | |
| Aomori | Sannohe | 627.1 | 389.7 | National Route 104 west – Kazuno, Takko; Aomori Prefecture Route 258 north – Sannohe | Interchange; southern end of National Route 104 concurrency |
| Aomori | Sannohe | 629.2 | 391.0 | Aomori Prefecture Route 45 – Shingō, Central Sannohe | |
| Aomori | Sannohe | 630.2 | 391.6 | Aomori Prefecture Route 45 north – Central Sannohe | |
| Aomori | Nanbu | 633.0 | 393.3 | Aomori Prefecture Route 258 south – Sannohe Station | |
| Aomori | Nanbu | 633.3 | 393.5 | Aomori Prefecture Route 233 north – Tekurabashi | |
| Aomori | Nanbu | 635.0 | 394.6 | Aomori Prefecture Route 222 south – Okitaomote | |
| Aomori | Nanbu | 636.2 | 395.3 | Aomori Prefecture Route 224 east – Nakuidake Prefectural Natural Park | |
| Aomori | Nanbu | 640.0 | 397.7 | Aomori Prefecture Route 33 south – Karumai | |
| Aomori | Nanbu | 640.7 | 398.1 | National Route 104 east – Hachinohe | Northern end of National Route 104 concurrency |
| Aomori | Gonohe | 644.9 | 400.7 | Aomori Prefecture Route 233 south – Tekurabashi, Asamizu | |
| Aomori | Gonohe | 646.8 | 401.9 | National Route 454 east – Hachinohe | Southern end of National Route 454 concurrency |
| Aomori | Gonohe | 649.8 | 403.8 | Aomori Prefecture Route 15 – Gonohe Town Office, Shingō | Interchange |
| Aomori | Gonohe | 651.2 | 404.6 | National Route 454 west – Hachinohe | Interchange; northern end of National Route 454 concurrency |
| Aomori | Gonohe | 652.6 | 405.5 | Aomori Prefecture Route 113 north – Gonohe | Interchange |
| Aomori | Gonohe | 653.1 | 405.8 | Aomori Prefecture Route 168 west – Kirida | |
| Aomori | Towada | 655.9 | 407.6 | Aomori Prefecture Route 212 north – Rokunohe | |
| Aomori | Towada | 662.6 | 411.7 | National Route 45 south – Kuji, Hachinohe; National Route 102 west – Lake Towada, Central Towada | Southern end of National Route 45 concurrency |
| Aomori | Towada | 665.4 | 413.5 | Aomori Prefecture Route 10 (Misawa Kaidō) – to Daini-Michinoku Toll Road, Central Towada, Misawa | One-quadrant interchange |
| Aomori | Towada | 667.0 | 414.5 | Aomori Prefecture Route 165 – Central Towada, Tōhoku | |
| Aomori | Towada | 669.7 | 416.1 | Aomori Prefecture Route 10 east – Central Towada | |
| Aomori | Towada | 671.4 | 417.2 | Aomori Prefecture Route 169 east – Tachizaki | |
| Aomori | Shichinohe | 675.8 | 419.9 | Aomori Prefecture Route 22 – Central Shichinohe, Lake Ogawara, Misawa | |
| Aomori | Shichinohe | 677.0 | 420.7 | National Route 394 – Yachi, Kuroishi, Rokkasho, Tōhoku | |
| Aomori | Shichinohe | 680.1 | 422.6 | Aomori Prefecture Route 173 north – Tōhoku | |
| Aomori | Shichinohe | 686.3 | 426.4 | Aomori Prefecture Route 242 west – to Michinoku Toll Road, Aomori | |
| Aomori | Tōhoku | 692.2 | 430.1 | Aomori Prefecture Route 8 south – Misawa | |
| Aomori | Tōhoku | 693.6 | 431.0 | Shimokita Expressway north – Mutsu | Noheji Interchange |
| Aomori | Noheji | 694.2 | 431.4 | National Route 279 north – Mutsu | |
| Aomori | Noheji | 699.3 | 434.5 | Aomori Prefecture Route 243 east – Mutsu, Noheji | |
| Aomori | Hiranai | 707.5 | 439.6 | Aomori Prefecture Route 123 west – Mutsu | |
| Aomori | Hiranai | 711.0 | 441.8 | Aomori Prefecture Route 9 west (Natsudomari Scallop Line) – Natsudomari Peninsula | |
| Aomori | Hiranai | 713.2 | 443.2 | Aomori Prefecture Route 215 north – Hiranai Town Office, Kominato Station | |
| Aomori | Hiranai | 717.1 | 445.6 | Aomori Prefecture Route 207 north – Nishi-Hiranai Station | |
| Aomori | Hiranai | 718.9 | 446.7 | Aomori Prefecture Route 9 east (Natsudomari Scallop Line) – Natsudomari Peninsula | Southern end of Aomori Prefecture Route 9 concurrency |
| Aomori | Hiranai | 720.0 | 447.4 | Aomori Prefecture Route 9 west (Ōshū Kaidō) | Northern end of Aomori Prefecture Route 9 concurrency |
| Aomori | Aomori | 724.3 | 450.1 | Aomori Prefecture Route 269 east | |
| Aomori | Aomori | 725.8 | 451.0 | Aomori Prefecture Route 259 west – Nonai | |
| Aomori | Aomori | 729.7 | 453.4 | Aomori Prefecture Route 44 – to Aomori Expressway, Michinoku Toll Road, Nonai | |
| Aomori | Aomori | 732.1 | 454.9 | National Route 7 south (Aomori Belt Highway) – to Aomori Expressway, Hirosaki, Fujisaki | |
| Aomori | Aomori | 733.8 | 456.0 | Aomori Prefecture Route 259 east – Nonai, Aomori Prefectural Hospital | |
| Aomori | Aomori | 736.7 | 457.8 | Aomori Prefecture Route 27 west – Aomori Airport | |
| Aomori | Aomori | 737.7 | 458.4 | National Route 103 south (Kanko-dōri) – to Aomori Expressway, Lake Towada | |
| Aomori | Aomori | 738.1 | 458.6 | Aomori Prefecture Route 120 south – to Aomori Airport, Aomori Expressway, Lake Towada; Aomori Prefecture Route 16 west – Aomori Station, Aomori Port | Southern end of Aomori Prefecture Route 120 concurrency |
| Aomori | Aomori | 738.5 | 458.9 | National Route 7 south / National Route 101 south / National Route 280 north / Aomori Prefecture Route 120 north Aomori West Bypass | Northern terminus; northern end of concurrency with National Route 45 and Aomori Prefecture Route 120 |
1.000 mi = 1.609 km; 1.000 km = 0.621 mi: Concurrency terminus; Incomplete access; Route transition

== See also ==
- Edo Five Routes, the five centrally administered routes, or kaidō, that connected the capital of Japan at Edo (now Tokyo) with the outer provinces during the Edo period.
- Tōhoku Expressway, an expressway managed by the East Nippon Expressway Company that parallels Route 4 from Tokyo to Aomori.
