= Shiroishi Station =

Shiroishi Station may refer to the following train stations in Japan:

- Shiroishi Station (Kumamoto), on the Hisatsu Line in Ashikita, Kumamoto Prefecture
- Shiroishi Station (Miyagi), on the Tōhoku Main Line in Shiroishi, Miyagi Prefecture
- Shiroishi Station (JR Hokkaido), on the Chitose Line and Hakodate Main Line in Sapporo, Hokkaidō
- Shiroishi Station (Sapporo Municipal Subway), subway station in Sapporo, Hokkaidō

== See also ==
- Higashi-Shiroishi Station, on the Tōhoku Main Line in Shiroishi, Miyagi Prefecture
- Hizen-Shiroishi Station, on the Nagasaki Main Line in Shiroishi, Saga Prefecture
- Shiroishi-Zaō Station, on the Tōhoku Shinkansen in Shiroishi, Miyagi Prefecture
- Shironishi Station
