= 大河原駅 =

大河原駅, meaning station of big riverbank, is the name of two train stations in Japan:

- Ōgawara Station
- Ōkawara Station
