= Kita-Shirakawa Station =

Railway station in Shiroishi, Miyagi Prefecture, Japan

Kita-Shirakawa Station 北白川駅
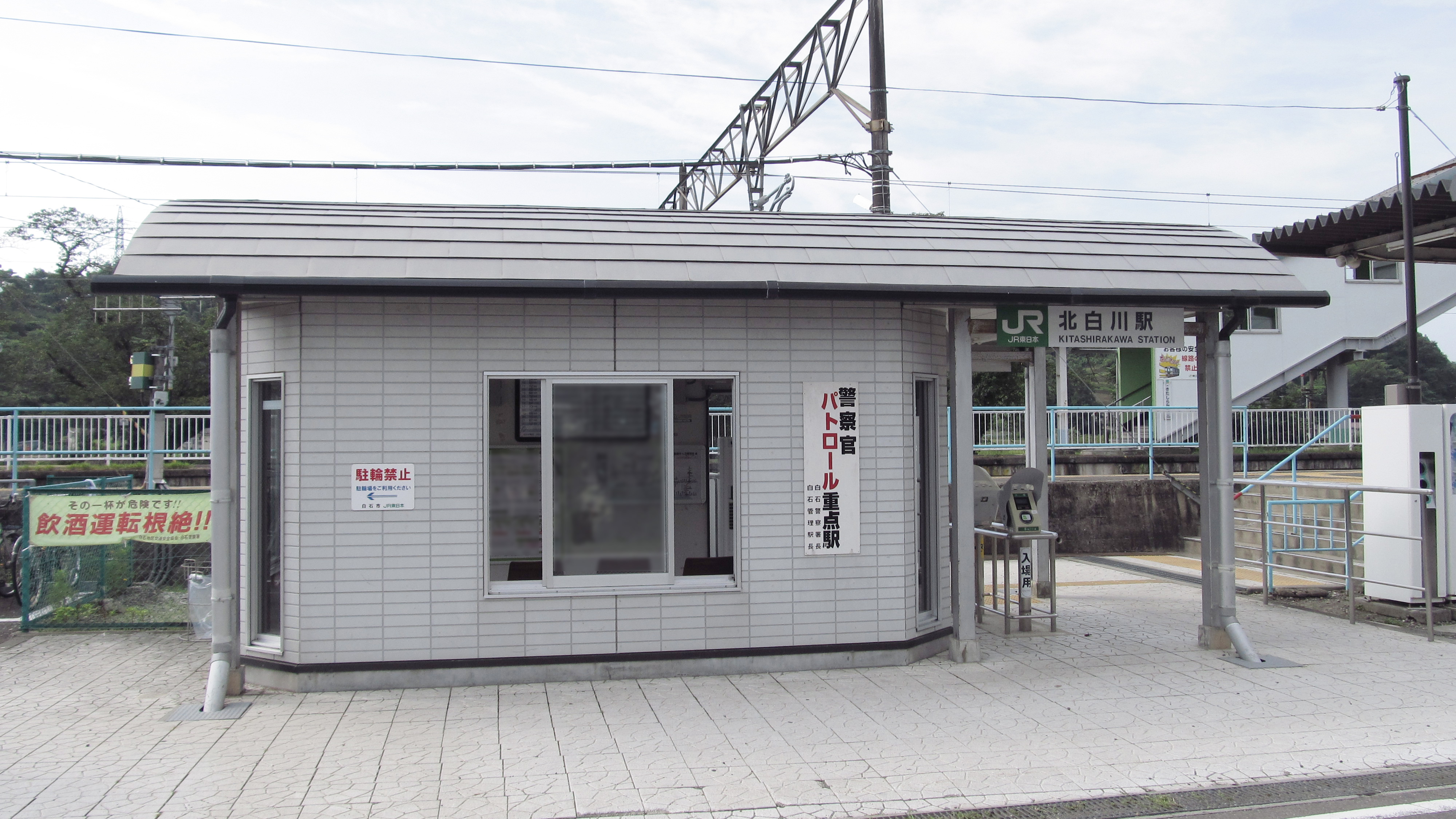
- Kita-Shirakawa Station, August 2014

General information
- Location: Shirakawa-tsuda, Shiroishi-shi, Miyagi-ken 989-1102; Japan
- Coordinates: 38°01′57.0″N 140°41′32.87″E
- Operator: JR East
- Line: ■ Tōhoku Main Line
- Distance: 315.3 km from Tokyo
- Platforms: 1 side +1 island platform
- Tracks: 3

Other information
- Status: Unstaffed
- Website: Official website

History
- Opened: December 19, 1911

Services
Preceding station	JR East	Following station
Higashi-Shiroishi towards Kuroiso	Tōhoku Main Line Local	Ōgawara towards Morioka
Location
- Location within Miyagi Prefecture Location within Japan

Kita-Shirakawa Station (北白川駅, Kita-Shirakawa-eki) is a railway station in the city of Shiroishi, Miyagi Prefecture, Japan, operated by East Japan Railway Company (JR East).

== Lines ==
Kita-Shirakawa Station is served by the Tōhoku Main Line, and is located 315.3 rail kilometers from the official starting point of the line at Tokyo.

== Station layout ==
The station has a single side platform and an island platform connected to the station building by a footbridge. One side of the island platform is fenced off and not in use. The station is unstaffed and managed by Shiroishi-Zaō Station.

=== Platforms ===
1	■ Tōhoku Main Line	for Iwanuma,Natori and Sendai
2	■ Tōhoku Main Line	siding
2	■ Tōhoku Main Line	for Shiroishi, Fukushima, Kōriyama

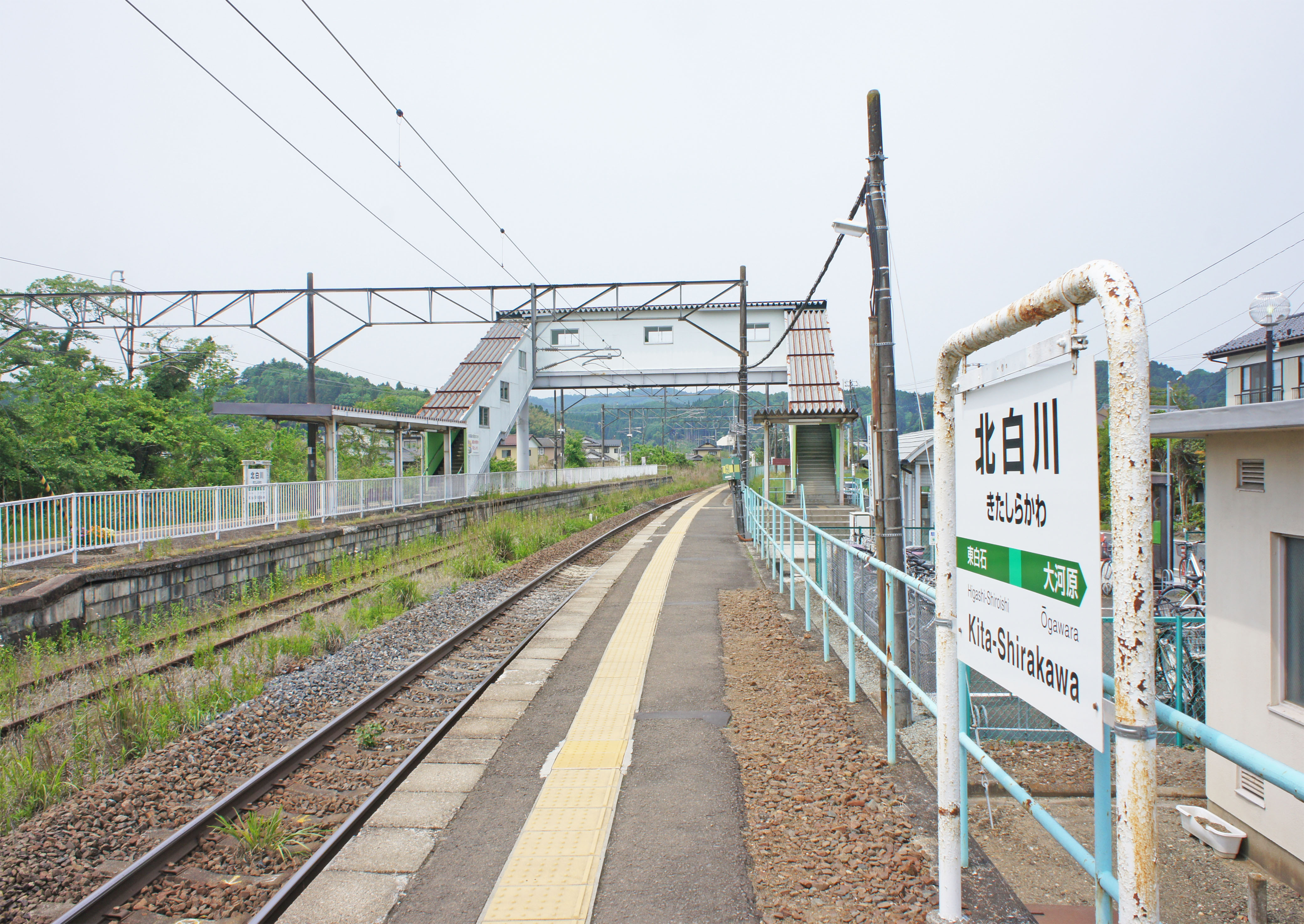
View along the outbound line

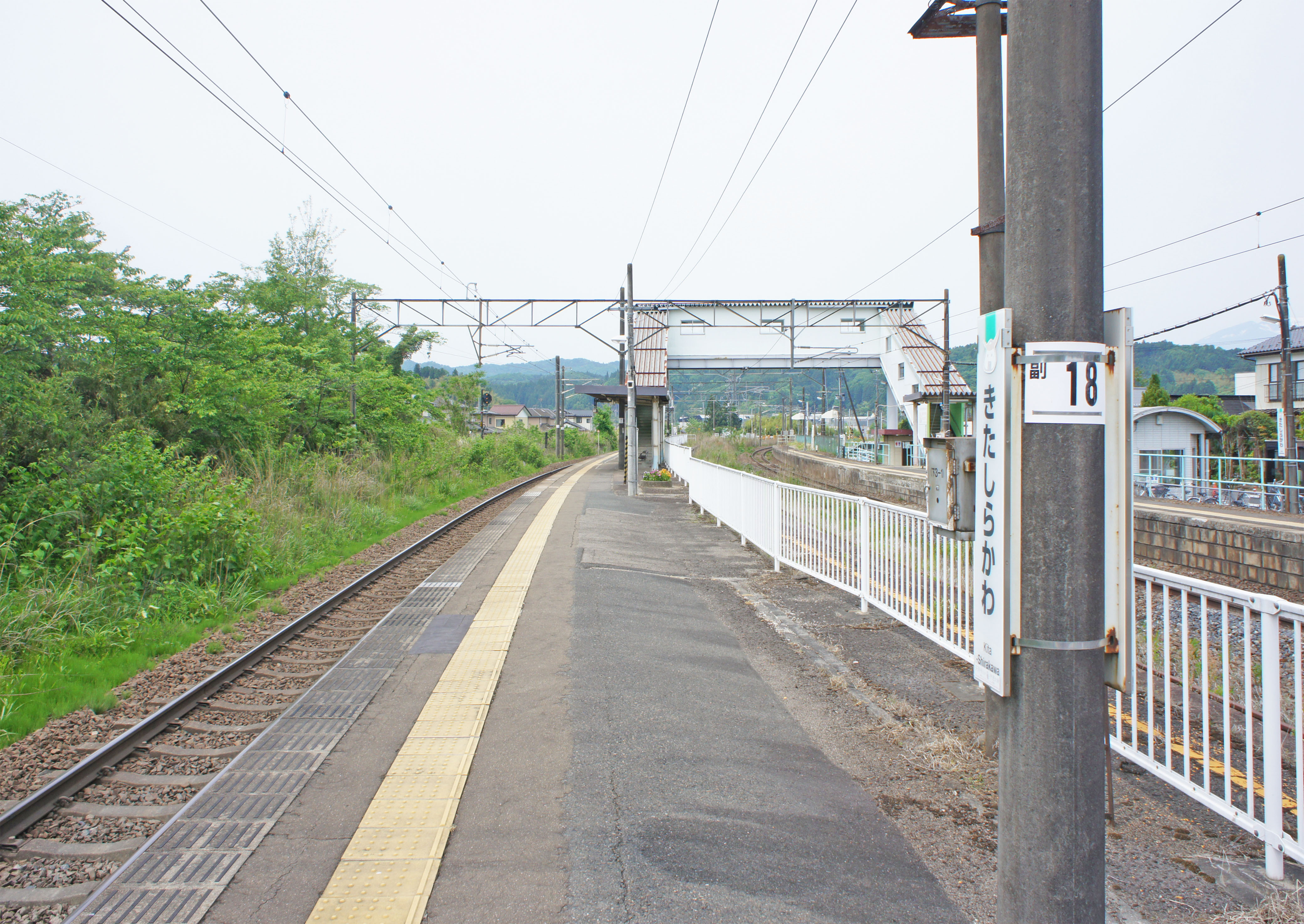
View along the inbound line

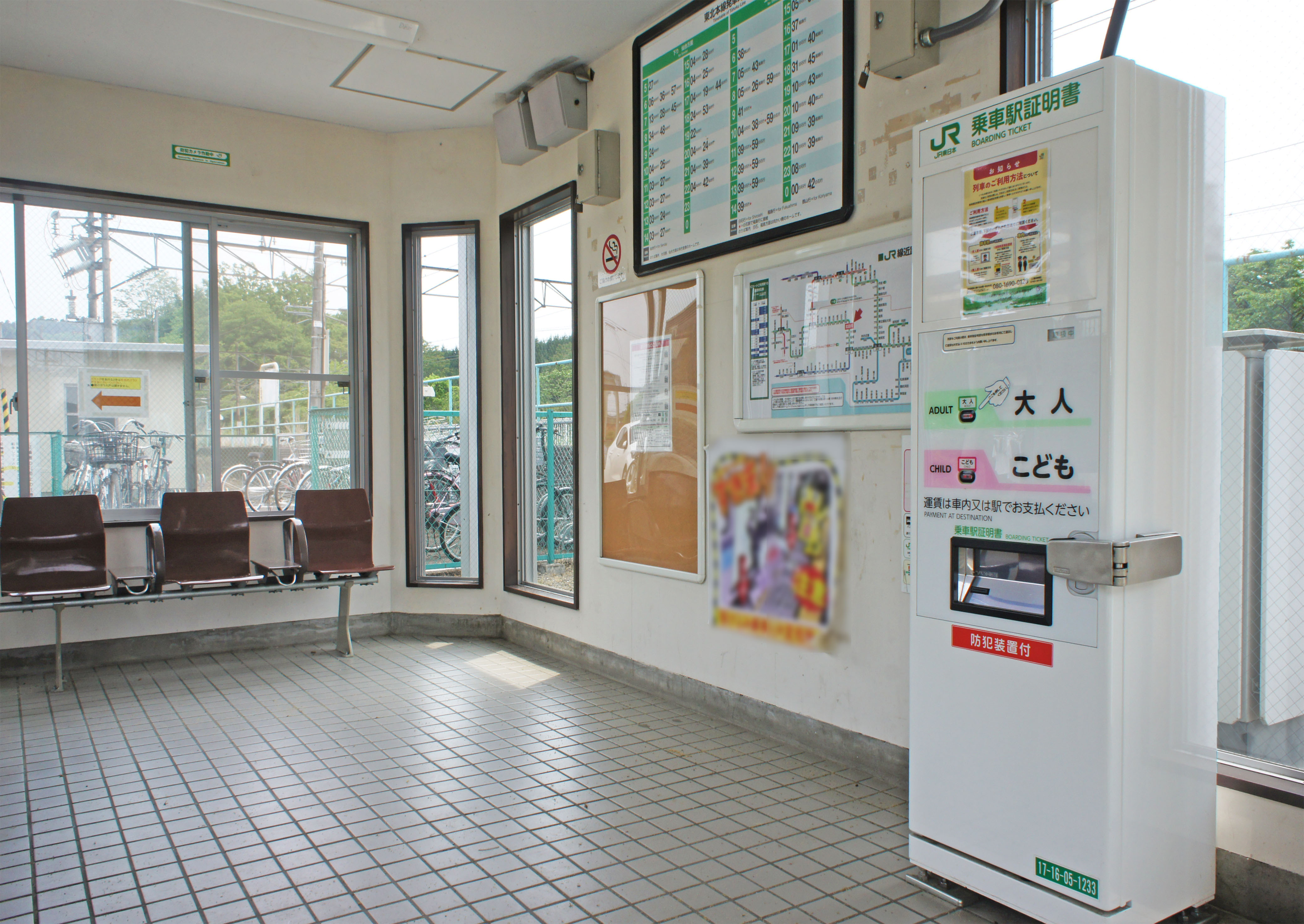
Waiting room

== History ==
Kita-Shirakawa Station opened on December 19, 1911. The station was absorbed into the JR East network upon the privatization of the Japanese National Railways (JNR) on April 1, 1987.

== Surrounding area ==
- Kita-Shirakawa Post Office
- Shiroishi River

== See also ==
- List of railway stations in Japan
