= Funaoka Station (Miyagi) =

Railway station in Shibata, Miyagi Prefecture, Japan

Funaoka Station 船岡駅
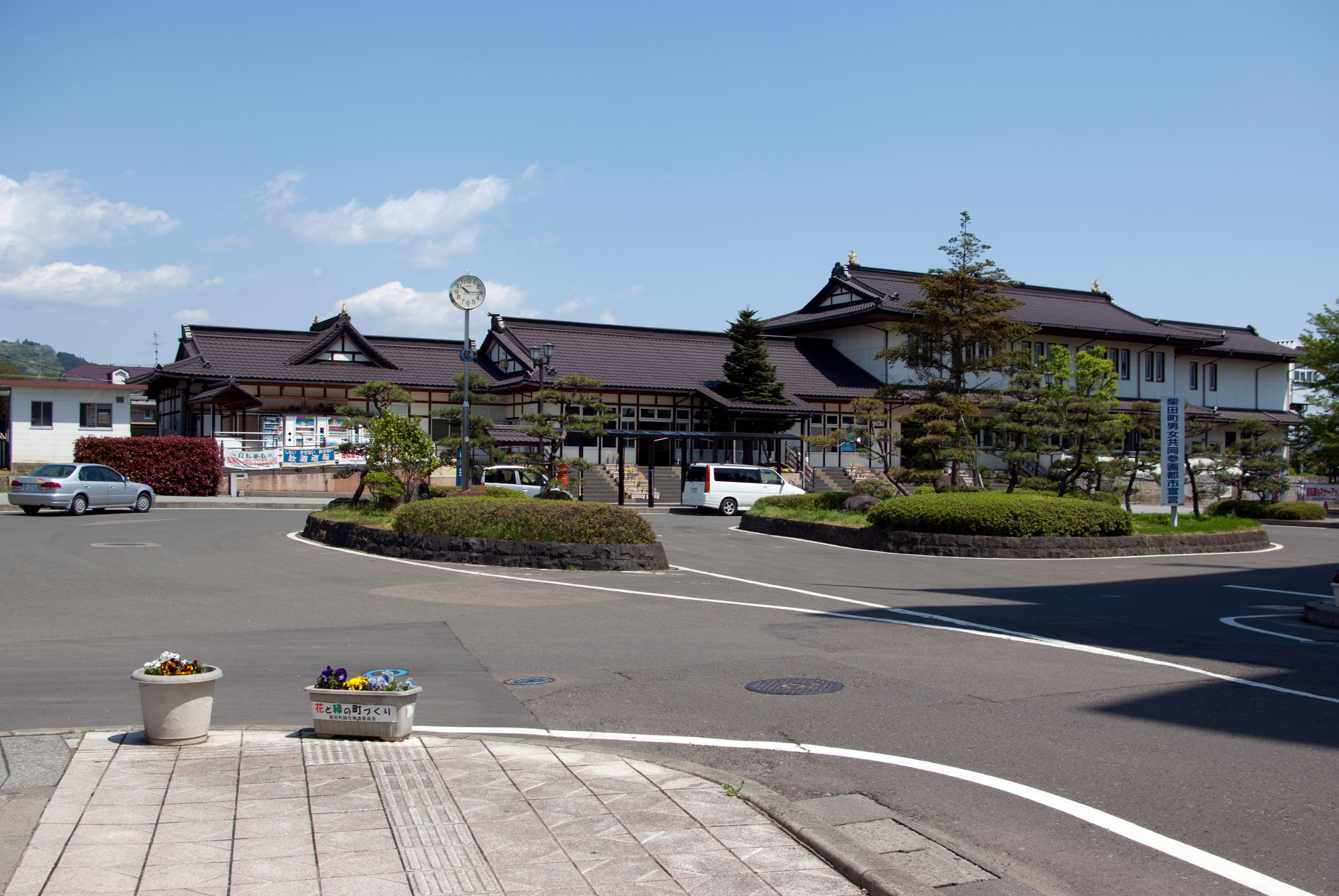
- Funaoka Station, May 2010

General information
- Location: 1-1-1 Funaoka-chuo, Shibata-machi, Shibata-gun, Miyagi-ken 989-1601; Japan
- Coordinates: 38°03′33.49″N 140°46′4.70″E
- Operator: JR East
- Line: ■ Tōhoku Main Line
- Distance: 323.1 km from Tokyo
- Platforms: 2 side platforms
- Tracks: 2

Other information
- Status: Staffed ("Midori no Madoguchi")
- Website: Official website

History
- Opened: February 25, 1929

Passengers
- FY2018: 3326 daily

Services
Preceding station	JR East	Following station
Ōgawara towards Fukushima	Tōhoku Main Line Rapid City Rabbit	Tsukinoki towards Sendai
Ōgawara towards Kuroiso	Tōhoku Main Line Local	Tsukinoki towards Morioka
Location
- Location within Miyagi Prefecture Location within Japan

Funaoka Station (船岡駅, Funaoka-eki) is a railway station in the town of Shibata, Miyagi Prefecture, Japan, operated by East Japan Railway Company (JR East).

== Lines ==
Funaoka Station is served by the Tōhoku Main Line, and is located 323.1 rail kilometers from the official starting point of the line at Tokyo.

== Station layout ==
The station has two opposed side platforms connected to the station building by a footbridge. The station has a Midori no Madoguchi staffed ticket office.

=== Platforms ===
1	■ Tōhoku Main Line	for Shiroishi, Fukushima, Kōriyama
2	■ Tōhoku Main Line	for Iwanuma,Natori and Sendai

== History ==
Funaoka Station opened on February 25, 1929. The station was absorbed into the JR East network upon the privatization of the Japanese National Railways (JNR) on April 1, 1987.

== Passenger statistics ==
In fiscal 2018, the station was used by an average of 3,326 passengers daily (boarding passengers only).

== Surrounding area ==
- Shibata City Hall
- Shibata Post Office
- site of Shibata Castle
- Sendai University

== See also ==
- List of railway stations in Japan
