= Shibata, Miyagi =

Shibata 柴田町
- Town
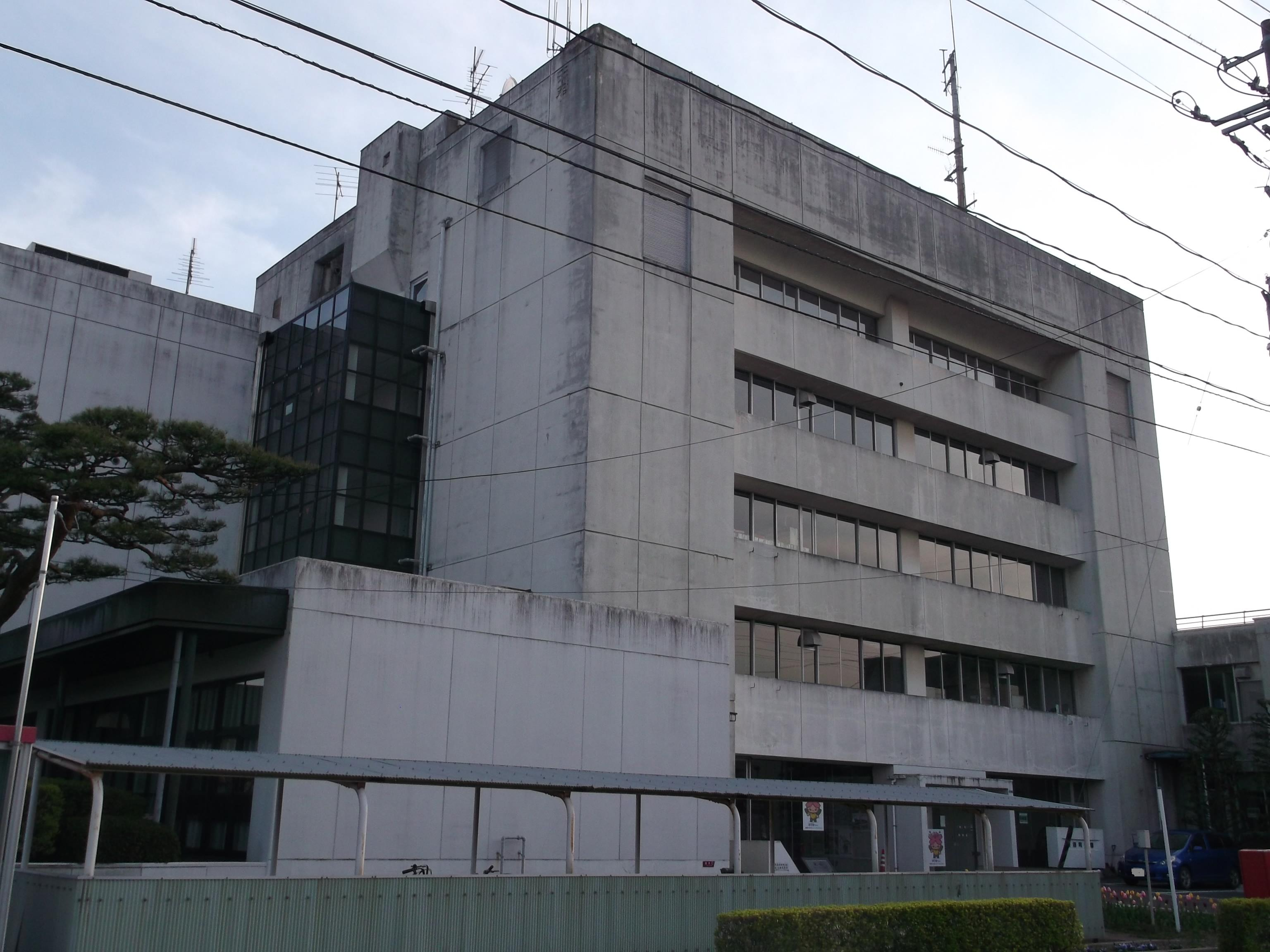
- Shibata Town Office

- Flag Seal

- Location of Shibata in Miyagi Prefecture

- Coordinates: 38°03′23.7″N 140°45′57.0″E
- Country: Japan
- Region: Tōhoku
- Prefecture: Miyagi
- District: Shibata

Area
  - Total: 54.03 km^{2} (20.86 sq mi)

Population (May 31, 2020)
  - Total: 37,617
  - Density: 696.2/km^{2} (1,803/sq mi)
- Time zone: UTC+9 (Japan Standard Time)
- Tree: Momi Fir
- Flower: Sakura
- Bird: Pheasant
- Phone number: 0224-55-2111
- Address: 2-3-45 Funaoka-chuo, Shibata-machi, Shibata-gun, Miyagi-ken 989-1692
- Website: Official website

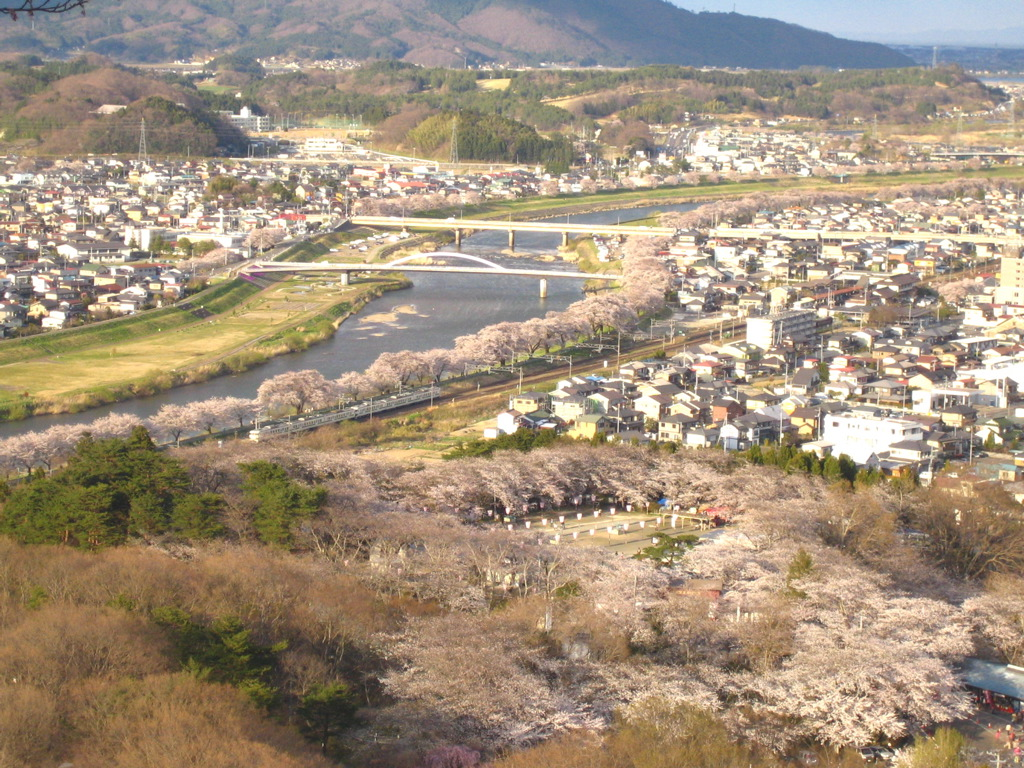
View of Funaoka

Shibata (柴田町, Shibata-machi) is a town located in Miyagi Prefecture, Japan. As of 31 March 2020, the town had an estimated population of 37,617, and a population density of 700 persons per km^{2} in 15,590 households. The total area of the town is 54.03 square kilometres (20.86 sq mi).

== Geography ==
Shibata is located in south-central Miyagi Prefecture in the Tōhoku region of northern Japan. The Abukuma River runs through the town.

=== Neighboring municipalities ===
Miyagi Prefecture

- Iwanuma
- Kakuda
- Murata
- Natori
- Ōgawara
- Watari

=== Climate ===
Shibata has a humid subtropical climate (Köppen climate classification Cfa) characterized by mild summers and cold winters. The average annual temperature in Shibata is 12.5 °C. The average annual rainfall is 1263 mm with September as the wettest month. The temperatures are highest on average in August, at around 24.9 °C, and lowest in January, at around 1.4 °C.

== Demographics ==
Per Japanese census data, the population of Shibata increased throughout the 20th century and has declined slightly in the 21st.

Historical population
Year	Pop.	±%
1920	11,096	—
1930	12,218	+10.1%
1940	14,386	+17.7%
1950	22,682	+57.7%
1960	23,515	+3.7%
1970	26,388	+12.2%
1980	32,106	+21.7%
1990	37,315	+16.2%
2000	39,485	+5.8%
2010	39,341	−0.4%
2020	38,270	−2.7%

== History ==
The area of present-day Shibata was part of ancient Mutsu Province, and was part of the holdings of Sendai Domain under the Edo period Tokugawa shogunate. The villages of Funaoka and Tsukinoki were established on April 1, 1889, with the establishment of the post-Meiji restoration modern municipalities system. Tsukioki was promoted to town status on April 1, 1904, and Funaoka on November 3, 1941. The two towns merged to form Shibata on April 1, 1956.

== Government ==
Shibata has a mayor-council form of government with a directly elected mayor and a unicameral town council of 18 members. Shibata, together with the rest of Shibata District, collectively contributes two seats to the Miyagi Prefectural legislature. In terms of national politics, the town is part of Miyagi 3rd district of the lower house of the Diet of Japan.

== Economy ==
The economy of Shibata is largely based on agriculture.

== Education ==
- Sendai University
- Shibata has six public elementary schools and three public middle schools operated by the town government, and one public high school operated by the Miyagi Prefectural Board of Education. The prefecture also operates one special education school for the handicapped.

== Transportation ==
=== Railway ===
AbukumaExpress - Abukuma Express Line

- Tsukinoki - Higashi-Funaoka

East Japan Railway Company (JR East) - Tōhoku Main Line

- Funaoka - Tsukinoki

=== Highway ===
- National Route 4
- National Route 349

== Local attractions ==
- Site of Funaoka Castle

== Sister cities ==
- Assis Chateaubriand, Paraná, Brazil since April 13, 1981
- Danyang, Jiangsu, China, since February 23, 1994
- Kitakami, Iwate, Japan, since January 25, 1980
- Date, Hokkaido, Japan, since May 30, 1988 (friendship city)
