= Higashi-Funaoka Station =

Railway station in Shibata, Miyagi Prefecture, Japan

Higashi-Funaoka Station 東船岡駅
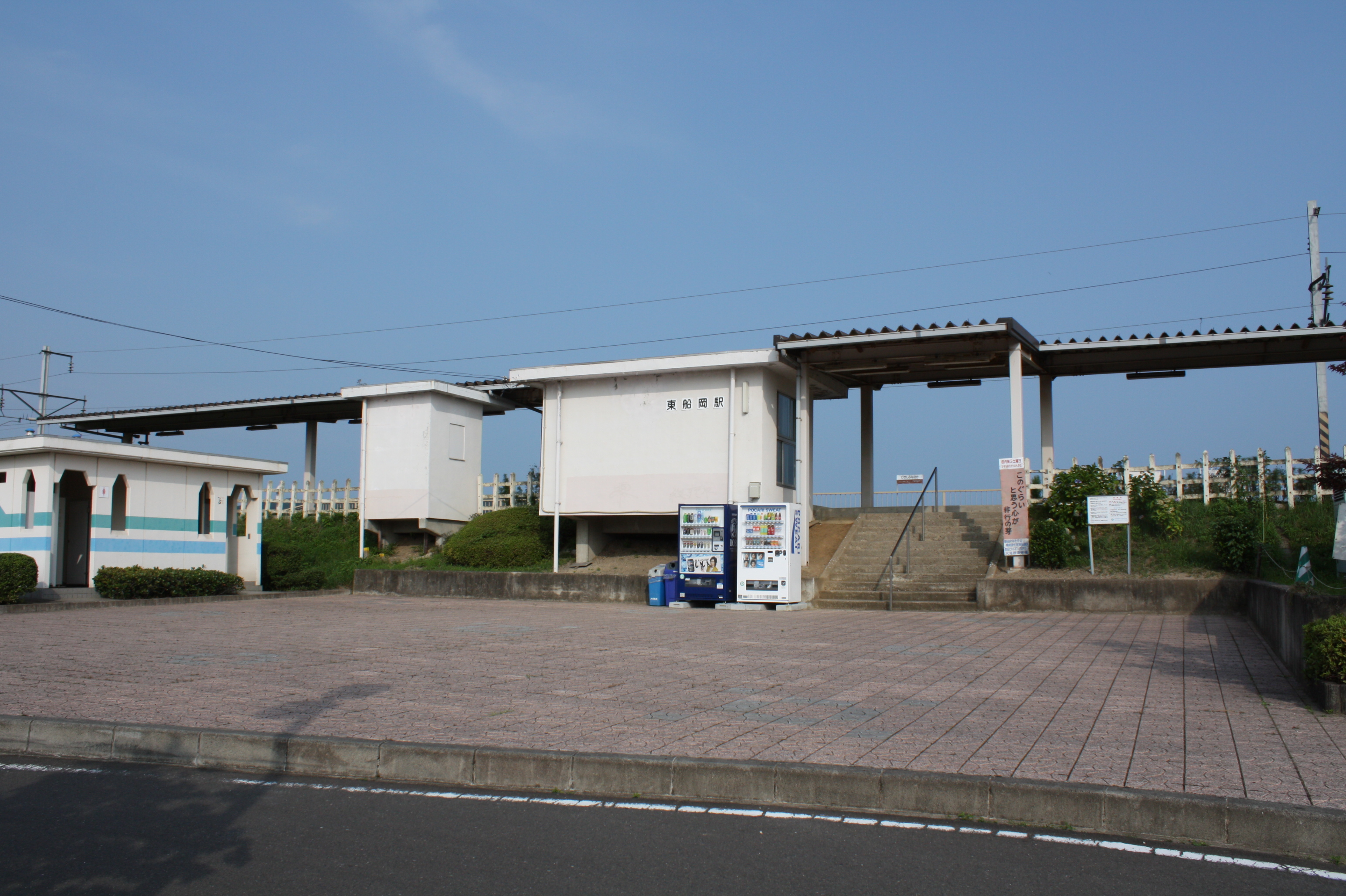
- Higashi-Funaoka Station, August 2008

General information
- Location: Kami-no-myo, Shibata-machi, Miyagi-gun, Miyagi-ken 989-1611; Japan
- Coordinates: 38°03′0.70″N 140°47′23.18″E
- Operator: AbukumaExpress
- Line: ■ Abukuma Express Line
- Distance: 51.3 km from Fukushima
- Platforms: 2 side platforms
- Tracks: 2

Other information
- Status: Unstaffed
- Website: Official website

History
- Opened: April 1, 1968
- Former names: Yokohashi (to 1986)

Passengers
- FY 2015: 159 daily
Location
- Location within Miyagi Prefecture Location within Japan

Higashi-Funaoka Station (東船岡駅, Higashi-Funaoka eki) is a railway station in the town of Shibata, Miyagi Prefecture, Japan, operated by the third-sector railway company AbukumaExpress

== Lines ==
Higashi-Funaoka Station is served by the Abukuma Express Line, and is located 51.3 rail kilometers from the official starting point of the line at Fukushima.

== Station layout ==
The station has two opposed side platforms connected to the station building by a level crossing. The station is unattended.

== Adjacent stations ==
«	Service	»
Abukuma Express Line
Rapid: Does not stop at this station
Oka	Local	Tsukinoki

== History ==
Higashi-Funaoka Station opened on April 1, 1968, as Yokohashi Station (横橋駅). on the Japanese National Railways (JNR). The station was renamed to its present name on July 1, 1986, with the establishment of the Abukuma Express.

== Surrounding area ==
- National Route 349
- JGSDF Camp Funaoka

== See also ==
- List of railway stations in Japan
