= Tsukinoki Station =

Railway station in Shibata, Miyagi Prefecture, Japan

Tsukinoki Station 槻木駅
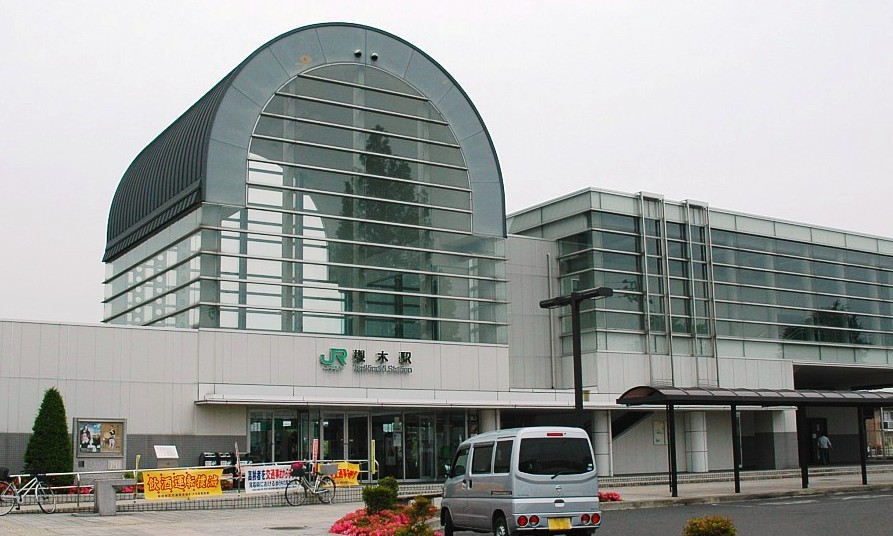
- Tsukinoki Station, June 2007

General information
- Location: 1-1-1 Tsukinoki-shinmachi, Shibata-machi, Shibata-gun, Miyagi-ken 989-1751; Japan
- Coordinates: 38°04′43.04″N 140°48′35.83″E
- Operator: JR East; AbukumaExpress
- Lines: ■ Tōhoku Main Line; ■ Abukuma Express Line
- Distance: 327.7 km from Tokyo
- Platforms: 2 side platforms
- Tracks: 2

Other information
- Status: Staffed ("Midori no Madoguchi")
- Website: Official website

History
- Opened: 12 January 1891; 135 years ago

Passengers
- 2843 daily (JR East FY 2018); 1195 daily (Abukuma, FY2015)

Services
Preceding station	JR East	Following station
Funaoka towards Fukushima	Tōhoku Main Line Rapid City Rabbit	Iwanuma towards Sendai
Funaoka towards Kuroiso	Tōhoku Main Line Local	Iwanuma towards Morioka
Preceding station	Abukuma Express	Following station
Higashi-Funaoka toward Fukushima	Abukuma Express Line	Terminus
Location
- Location within Miyagi Prefecture Location within Japan

Tsukinoki Station (槻木駅, Tsukinoki-eki) is a junction railway station in the town of Shibata, Miyagi Prefecture, Japan, jointly operated by East Japan Railway Company (JR East) and the third-sector AbukumaExpress.

== Lines ==
Tsukinoki Station is served by the Tōhoku Main Line, and is located 327.7 rail kilometers from the official starting point of the line at Tokyo. It is also a terminal station for the Abukuma Express Line and is 54.9 rail kilometers from the opposing terminal at Fukushima.

== Station layout ==
The station has two opposed side platforms connected to the station building by a footbridge. The station has a Midori no Madoguchi staffed ticket office.

=== Platforms ===
1	■ Tōhoku Main Line	for Shiroishi, Fukushima and Kōriyama
2	■ Abukuma Express Line	for Kakuda, Marumori and Yanagawa
3	■ Tōhoku Main Line	for Iwanuma, Natori and Sendai

== History ==
Tsukinoki Station opened on 12 January 1891. The station was absorbed into the JR East network upon the privatization of the Japanese National Railways (JNR) on 1 April 1987. A new station building was completed in June 1998.

== Passenger statistics ==
In fiscal 2018, the JR East portion of the station was used by an average of 2,843 passengers daily (boarding passengers only). The Abukuma Express portion of the station was used by an average of 1,195 passengers daily in FY2015.

== Surrounding area ==
- National Route 4
- Tsukinoki Post Office

== See also ==
- List of railway stations in Japan
