= Shiroishi, Miyagi =

Shiroishi 白石市
- City
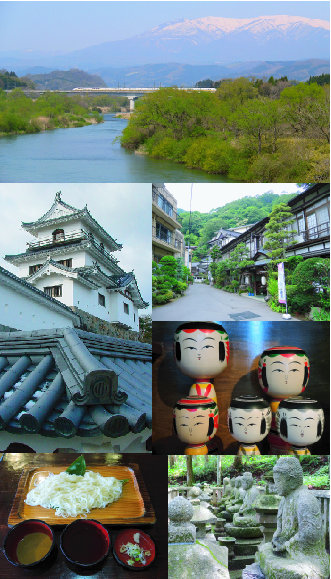
- Shiroishi montage, Top: Zao Mount Range and Shiroishi River, Middle left: Shiroishi Castle, Middle upper right: Kamasaka Spa, Middle lower right: Yajiro Kokeshi, Bottom left: Shiroishi Hot Noodle (Umen), Bottom right: Mausoleum of the Katakura Clan.

- Flag Emblem

- Location of Shiroishi in Miyagi Prefecture

- Coordinates: 38°0′8.89″N 140°37′10.81″E
- Country: Japan
- Region: Tōhoku
- Prefecture: Miyagi
- First official recorded: 721 AD
- City Settled: April 1, 1954

Government
  - -Mayor: Yūichi Yamada

Area
  - Total: 286.48 km^{2} (110.61 sq mi)

Population (May 31, 2020)
  - Total: 33,330
  - Density: 116.3/km^{2} (301.3/sq mi)
- Time zone: UTC+9 (Japan Standard Time)
- Phone number: 0224-25-2111
- Address: 1-1 Ōtemachi, Shiroishi-shi, Miyagi-ken 989-0292
- Climate: Cfa
- Website: Official website
- Symbols
- Bird: Japanese bush-warbler
- Flower: Kerria
- Tree: Japanese beech

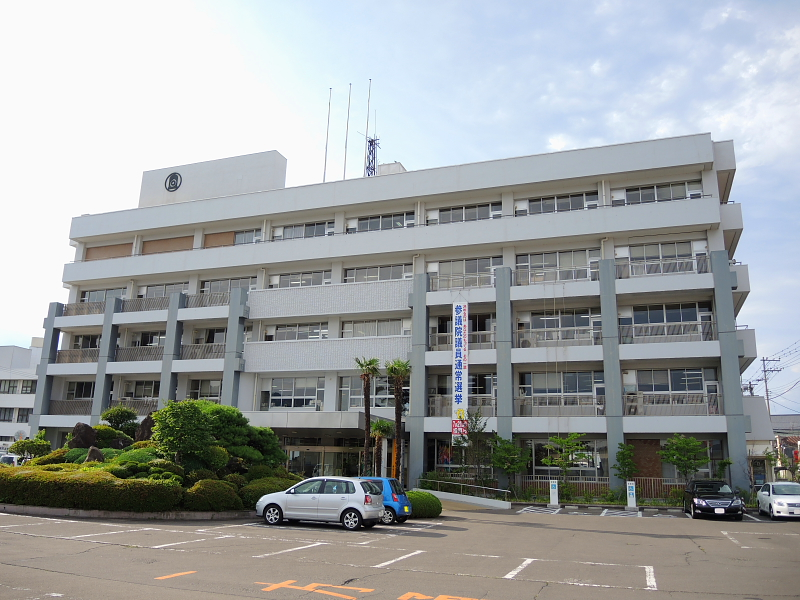
Shiroishi City Hall

Shiroishi (白石市, Shiroishi-shi) is a city in Miyagi Prefecture, Japan. As of 31 May 2020, the city had an estimated population of 33,330 and a population density of 120 persons per km^{2} in 14,242 households. The total area of the city is 286.48 square kilometres (110.61 sq mi).

== Geography ==
Shiroishi is in southern Miyagi Prefecture, in the Tōhoku region of northern Japan, bordered by Fukushima Prefecture to the south. The southern peak of Mount Zaō is within the city borders.

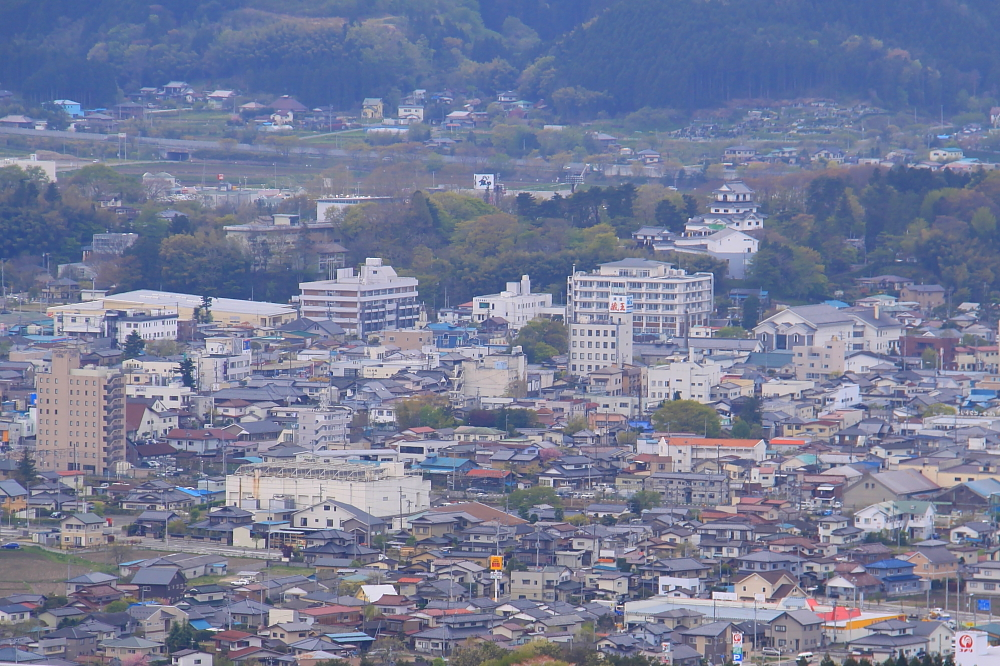
Panorama view of Shiroishi

=== Neighboring municipalities ===
Fukushima Prefecture

- Date
- Fukushima
- Koori
- Kunimi

Miyagi Prefecture

- Kakuda
- Marumori
- Ōgawara
- Shichikashuku
- Zaō

=== Climate ===
Shiroishi has a humid subtropical climate (Köppen climate classification Cfa) characterized by mild summers and cold winters. The average annual temperature in Shiroishi is 12.1 °C (53.8 °F). The average annual rainfall is 1,327.2 mm (52.25 in) with September as the wettest month. The temperatures are highest on average in August, at around 23.7 °C (74.7 °F), and lowest in January, at around 1.2 °C (34.2 °F).

Climate data for Shiroishi (elevation 86 m, 1991–2020 normals, extremes 1976–present)
Month	Jan	Feb	Mar	Apr	May	Jun	Jul	Aug	Sep	Oct	Nov	Dec	Year
Record high °C (°F)	16.3 (61.3)	20.6 (69.1)	23.7 (74.7)	30.1 (86.2)	34.1 (93.4)	34.7 (94.5)	36.9 (98.4)	36.7 (98.1)	36.4 (97.5)	31.4 (88.5)	25.8 (78.4)	20.9 (69.6)	36.9 (98.4)
Mean daily maximum °C (°F)	5.2 (41.4)	6.2 (43.2)	9.9 (49.8)	16.0 (60.8)	21.0 (69.8)	23.6 (74.5)	26.8 (80.2)	28.3 (82.9)	24.8 (76.6)	19.7 (67.5)	14.0 (57.2)	8.1 (46.6)	17.0 (62.6)
Daily mean °C (°F)	1.2 (34.2)	1.7 (35.1)	4.7 (40.5)	10.2 (50.4)	15.5 (59.9)	19.0 (66.2)	22.5 (72.5)	23.7 (74.7)	20.1 (68.2)	14.5 (58.1)	8.6 (47.5)	3.6 (38.5)	12.1 (53.8)
Mean daily minimum °C (°F)	−2.7 (27.1)	−2.6 (27.3)	−0.3 (31.5)	4.6 (40.3)	10.5 (50.9)	15.0 (59.0)	19.1 (66.4)	20.2 (68.4)	16.2 (61.2)	9.9 (49.8)	3.6 (38.5)	−0.7 (30.7)	7.7 (45.9)
Record low °C (°F)	−11.2 (11.8)	−11.6 (11.1)	−8.0 (17.6)	−5.0 (23.0)	1.7 (35.1)	6.3 (43.3)	10.4 (50.7)	11.2 (52.2)	6.0 (42.8)	−0.8 (30.6)	−5.2 (22.6)	−11.6 (11.1)	−11.6 (11.1)
Average precipitation mm (inches)	50.8 (2.00)	36.6 (1.44)	71.0 (2.80)	96.0 (3.78)	99.3 (3.91)	146.6 (5.77)	188.2 (7.41)	186.0 (7.32)	197.0 (7.76)	146.1 (5.75)	59.7 (2.35)	50.2 (1.98)	1,327.2 (52.25)
Average snowfall cm (inches)	43 (17)	33 (13)	16 (6.3)	1 (0.4)	0 (0)	0 (0)	0 (0)	0 (0)	0 (0)	0 (0)	0 (0)	15 (5.9)	109 (43)
Average precipitation days (≥ 1.0 mm)	7.8	6.5	8.9	8.4	9.3	12.2	14.4	12.4	12.7	9.3	7.4	8.7	117.8
Mean monthly sunshine hours	142.6	154.7	178.6	193.6	195.2	142.6	123.3	140.6	121.9	141.7	146.8	135.3	1,818.6
Source: Japan Meteorological Agency (1991–2020 normals, extremes 1976–present)

== Demographics ==
Per Japanese census data, the population of Shiroishi peaked around the year 1990 and has declined since.

Historical population
Year	Pop.	±%
1920	31,285	—
1930	34,051	+8.8%
1940	34,796	+2.2%
1950	44,871	+29.0%
1960	43,911	−2.1%
1970	40,886	−6.9%
1980	41,725	+2.1%
1990	42,262	+1.3%
2000	40,793	−3.5%
2010	37,422	−8.3%
2020	32,758	−12.5%

== History ==
The area of present-day Shiroishi was part of ancient Mutsu Province and was under control of the Date clan of Sendai Domain during the Edo period, under the Tokugawa shogunate. During the Boshin War of the Meiji Restoration, Shiroishi Castle was the site of a battle between the pro-imperial and pro-Tokugawa forces of the Ōuetsu Reppan Dōmei. After the end of the Boshin War, the Nambu clan of Morioka Domain was briefly relocated to a reduced domain centered on Shiroishi by the Meiji government.

The town of Shiroishi was established on June 1, 1889, with the establishment of the post-Meiji restoration modern municipalities system. The villages of Odaira, Otakasawa, Kosugo, Saikawa, Shirakawa and Fukuoka merged with Shiroishi on April 1, 1954, which was then raised to city status. The village of Obara was annexed to Shiroishi on March 31, 1957.

== Government ==
Shiroishi has a mayor-council form of government with a directly elected mayor and a unicameral city legislature of 18 members. Shiroishi, collectively with the towns of Zaō and Shichikashuku, contributes two seats to the Miyagi Prefectural legislature. In terms of national politics, the city is part of Miyagi 3rd district of the lower house of the Diet of Japan.

== Economy ==
Shiroishi has a mixed economy, dominated by light manufacturing of electronics, automotive components and food processing. Agriculture is dominated by rice cultivation on the flatlands and horticulture in more hilly areas.

== Education ==
Shiroishi has nine public elementary schools and five public junior high schools operated by the city government and two public high schools operated by the Miyagi Prefectural Board of Education. The prefecture also operates two special education schools.

== Transportation ==
=== Railway ===
East Japan Railway Company (JR East) - Tōhoku Shinkansen

- Shiroishi-Zaō

East Japan Railway Company (JR East) - Tōhoku Main Line

- Kosugō - Shiroishi - Higashi-Shiroishi - Kita-Shirakawa

=== Highways ===
- Tōhoku Expressway - Shiroishi IC
- National Route 4
- National Route 113
- National Route 457

== Local attractions ==
- Miyagi Zao Fox Village: Filled with real wild foxes
- Shiroishi Castle: restored in 1995 after its destruction in 1875. The castle has also become a tourist spot for "contents tourism" related to the video game Sengoku BASARA2.

== Sister cities ==
- Ebina, Kanagawa, Japan
- Noboribetsu, Hokkaido, Japan

=== Former ===
- Hurstville, New South Wales, Australia. The sister city relationship has been discontinued following the council amalgamations of Hurstville and Kogarah to form the merged Georges River Council.

== Noted people from Shiroishi ==
- Tetsuya Endo, Japanese professional wrestler
- Ōzutsu Man'emon – sumo wrestler
