= Tōhoku Main Line =

Railway line in the Kantō and Tōhoku regions of Japan

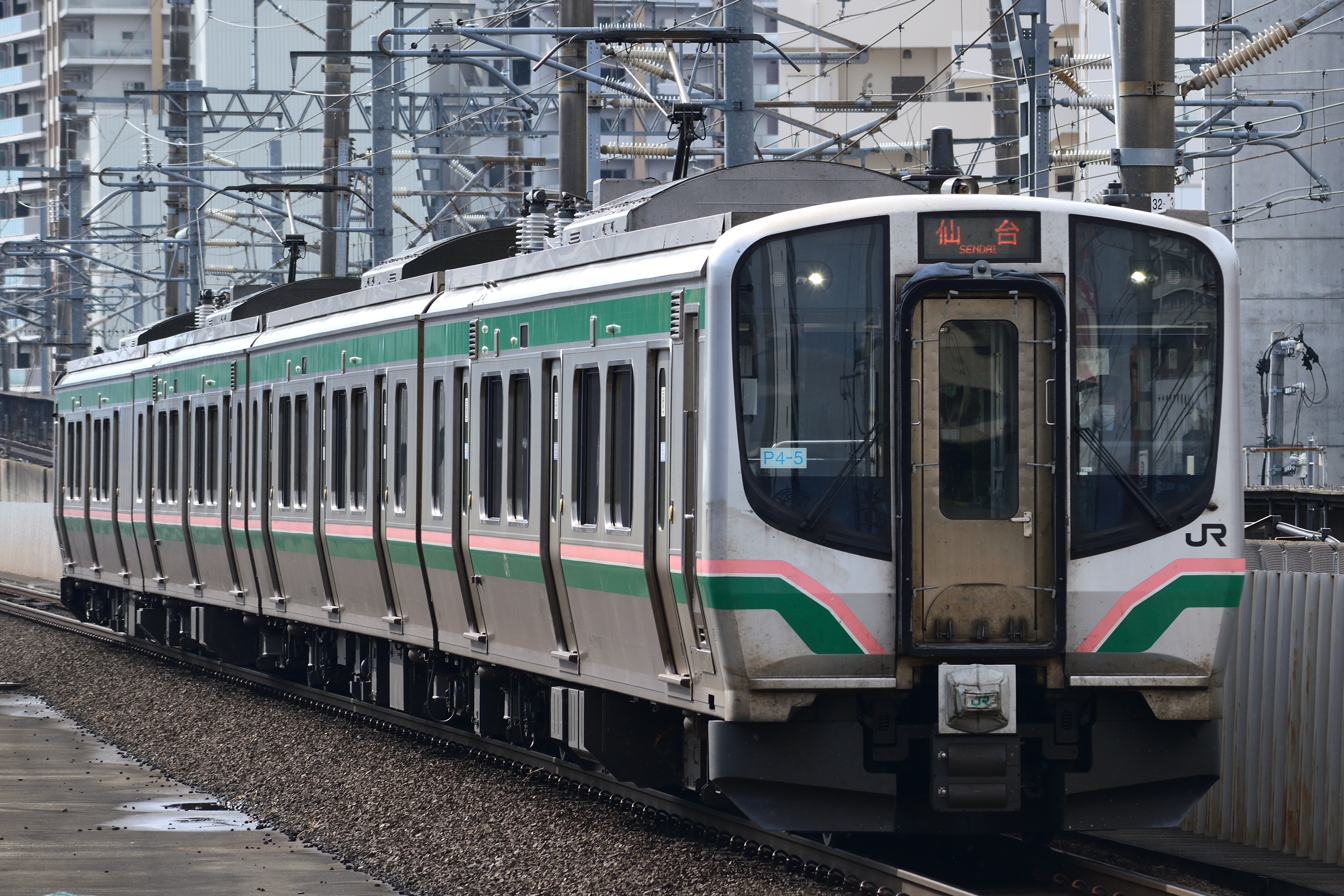
- An E721 series trains bound for Sendai in February 2021

Overview
- Native name: 東北本線
- Owner: JR East
- Locale: Kantō, Tōhoku
- Termini: Tokyo; Morioka

Service
- Type: Main line

History
- Opened: 28 July 1883; 143 years ago
- Last extension: 1 September 1891; 135 years ago

Technical
- Line length: 575.7 km (357.7 mi)
- Track gauge: 1,067 mm (3 ft 6 in)
- Electrification: Overhead line: 1,500 V DC (Tokyo–Kuroiso); 20 kV 50 Hz AC (Takaku–Morioka)
- Operating speed: 120 km/h (75 mph)
Route map
Tōhoku Main Line in red

The Tōhoku Main Line (Japanese: 東北本線, Hepburn: Tōhoku-honsen) is a 575.7-kilometre-long (357.7 mi) railway line in Japan operated by the East Japan Railway Company (JR East). The line runs from Ueno Station in Ueno, Tokyo through major cities including Saitama, Utsunomiya, Fukushima, and Sendai, terminating at Morioka in Iwate Prefecture. The line originally extended to Aomori, but was truncated following the extension of the Tōhoku Shinkansen beyond Morioka, which largely parallels the former route.

A portion of the Tōhoku Main Line is shared with the Keihin–Tōhoku Line (between Ueno and Ōmiya Station in Ōmiya-ku, Saitama) and the Saikyō Line (between Akabane Station in the Kita ward of Tokyo and Ōmiya Station).

In regular service, JR East applies different service names to sections of the Tōhoku Main Line. The 163.5-kilometre-long (101.6 mi) section between Tokyo Station and Kuroiso Station in Nasushiobara, Tochigi Prefecture is referred to as the Utsunomiya Line, while the remaining northern portion is referred to as the Tōhoku Line. This distinction reflects a change in electrification from 1,500 V DC south of Kuroiso to 20 kV 50 Hz AC north of the station; as a result, there are no regularly scheduled passenger services operating through Kuroiso Station.

== Station list ==
These lists are separated by service patterns provided on the Tōhoku Main Line.

=== Ueno – Kuroiso ===
The section between Tokyo and Kuroiso is known as the Utsunomiya Line.

=== Kuroiso – Shin-Shirakawa ===
Station	Distance from Tokyo (km)	Transfers	Location	
Kuroiso	163.3	Utsunomiya Line	Nasushiobara	Tochigi Prefecture
Takaku	167.3		Nasu	Tochigi Prefecture
Kurodahara	171.5		Nasu	Tochigi Prefecture
Toyohara	176.7		Nasu	Tochigi Prefecture
Shirasaka	182.0		Shirakawa	Fukushima Prefecture
Shin-Shirakawa	185.4	Tōhoku Shinkansen	Nishigo	Fukushima Prefecture

=== Shin-Shirakawa – Fukushima ===
All stations are located in Fukushima Prefecture.

Station	Distance from Tokyo (km)	Transfers	Location
Shin-Shirakawa	185.4	Tōhoku Shinkansen	Nishigo
Shirakawa	188.2		Shirakawa
Kutano	192.9		Shirakawa
Izumizaki	197.4		Izumizaki
Yabuki	203.4		Yabuki
Kagamiishi	208.8		Kagamiishi
Sukagawa	215.1		Sukagawa
Asaka-Nagamori	221.8	Suigun Line	Kōriyama
Kōriyama	226.7	Tōhoku Shinkansen; Ban'etsu West Line; Ban'etsu East Line; Suigun Line (through from Asaka-Nagamori to Kōriyama)	Kōriyama
Hiwada	232.4		Kōriyama
Gohyakugawa	236.9		Motomiya
Motomiya	240.7		Motomiya
Sugita	246.6		Nihonmatsu
Nihonmatsu	250.3		Nihonmatsu
Adachi	254.5		Nihonmatsu
Matsukawa	259.5		Fukushima
Kanayagawa	264.0		Fukushima
Minami-Fukushima	269.4		Fukushima
Fukushima	272.8	Tōhoku Shinkansen; Yamagata Shinkansen; Yamagata Line; Iizaka Line; Abukuma Express Line	Fukushima

=== Fukushima – Sendai ===
- ●: All rapid trains stop
- |: All rapid trains pass

Station	Distance from Tokyo (km)	Transfers	Location	
Fukushima	272.8	Tōhoku Shinkansen; Yamagata Shinkansen; ■ Ōu Main Line; Fukushima Kōtsū Iizaka Line; Abukuma Express Line	Fukushima	Fukushima Prefecture
Higashi-Fukushima	278.8		Fukushima	Fukushima Prefecture
Date	281.9		Date	Fukushima Prefecture
Koori	285.9		Koori	Fukushima Prefecture
Fujita	289.3		Kunimi	Fukushima Prefecture
Kaida	294.9		Kunimi	Fukushima Prefecture
Kosugō	298.6		Shiroishi	Miyagi Prefecture
Shiroishi	306.8		Shiroishi	Miyagi Prefecture
Higashi-Shiroishi	311.0		Shiroishi	Miyagi Prefecture
Kita-Shirakawa	315.3		Shiroishi	Miyagi Prefecture
Ōgawara	320.1		Ōgawara	Miyagi Prefecture
Funaoka	323.1		Shibata	Miyagi Prefecture
Tsukinoki	327.7	Abukuma Express Line	Shibata	Miyagi Prefecture
Iwanuma	334.2	■ Jōban Line	Iwanuma	Miyagi Prefecture
Tatekoshi	337.9	■ Jōban Line	Natori	Miyagi Prefecture
Natori	341.4	■ Jōban Line; Sendai Airport Line	Natori	Miyagi Prefecture
Minami-Sendai	344.1	■ Jōban Line; Sendai Airport Line	Taihaku-ku, Sendai	Miyagi Prefecture
Taishidō	346.3	■ Jōban Line; Sendai Airport Line	Taihaku-ku, Sendai	Miyagi Prefecture
Nagamachi	347.3	■ Jōban Line; ■ Sendai Subway Namboku Line; Sendai Airport Line	Taihaku-ku, Sendai	Miyagi Prefecture
Sendai	351.8	Tōhoku Shinkansen; Akita Shinkansen; ■ Senzan Line; ■ Senseki Line; ■ Jōban Line (through from Iwanuma to Sendai); ■ Sendai Subway Namboku Line; ■ Sendai Subway Tōzai Line; Sendai Airport Line	Aoba-ku, Sendai	Miyagi Prefecture

=== Sendai – Ichinoseki ===
Legends:

- ●: All rapid trains stop
- |: All rapid trains pass
- ‖: Senseki-Tōhoku Line trains do not travel on this section

Station	Distance from Tokyo (km)	Senseki-Tōhoku Line			Transfers	Location	
Station	Distance from Tokyo (km)	Rapid		Special Rapid	Transfers	Location	
Station	Distance from Tokyo (km)	Green	Red	Special Rapid	Transfers	Location	
Sendai	351.8	●	●	●	Tōhoku Shinkansen; Akita Shinkansen; ■ Senzan Line; ■ Senseki Line; ■ Jōban Line (through from Iwanuma to Sendai); ■ Sendai Subway Namboku Line; ■ Sendai Subway Tōzai Line; Sendai Airport Line (through from Natori)	Aoba-ku, Sendai	Miyagi Prefecture
Higashi-Sendai	355.8	●	|	|		Miyagino-ku, Sendai	Miyagi Prefecture
Iwakiri	359.9	●	|	|		Miyagino-ku, Sendai	Miyagi Prefecture
Shin-Rifu	2.5 (from Iwakiri)	‖	‖	‖	Branch line from Iwakiri	Rifu	Miyagi Prefecture
Rifu	4.2 (from Iwakiri)	‖	‖	‖	Branch line from Iwakiri	Rifu	Miyagi Prefecture
Rikuzen-Sannō	362.2	●	|	|		Tagajō	Miyagi Prefecture
Kokufu-Tagajō	363.5	●	|	|		Tagajō	Miyagi Prefecture
Shiogama	365.2	●	●	●	■ Senseki-Tōhoku Line	Shiogama	Miyagi Prefecture
Matsushima	375.2	Senseki-Tōhoku Line (for ■ Senseki Line)				Matsushima	Miyagi Prefecture
Atago	377.2	Senseki-Tōhoku Line (for ■ Senseki Line)				Matsushima	Miyagi Prefecture
Shinainuma	381.6	Senseki-Tōhoku Line (for ■ Senseki Line)				Matsushima	Miyagi Prefecture
Kashimadai	386.6	Senseki-Tōhoku Line (for ■ Senseki Line)				Ōsaki	Miyagi Prefecture
Matsuyama-Machi	391.5	Senseki-Tōhoku Line (for ■ Senseki Line)				Ōsaki	Miyagi Prefecture
Kogota	395.0	Senseki-Tōhoku Line (for ■ Senseki Line)			■ Rikuu East Line; ■ Ishinomaki Line	Misato	Miyagi Prefecture
Tajiri	401.1	Senseki-Tōhoku Line (for ■ Senseki Line)				Ōsaki	Miyagi Prefecture
Semine	407.8	Senseki-Tōhoku Line (for ■ Senseki Line)				Kurihara	Miyagi Prefecture
Umegasawa	411.5	Senseki-Tōhoku Line (for ■ Senseki Line)				Tome	Miyagi Prefecture
Nitta	416.2	Senseki-Tōhoku Line (for ■ Senseki Line)				Tome	Miyagi Prefecture
Ishikoshi	423.5	Senseki-Tōhoku Line (for ■ Senseki Line)				Tome	Miyagi Prefecture
Yushima	427.0	Senseki-Tōhoku Line (for ■ Senseki Line)				Ichinoseki	Iwate Prefecture
Hanaizumi	431.2	Senseki-Tōhoku Line (for ■ Senseki Line)				Ichinoseki	Iwate Prefecture
Shimizuhara	434.4	Senseki-Tōhoku Line (for ■ Senseki Line)				Ichinoseki	Iwate Prefecture
Arikabe	437.8	Senseki-Tōhoku Line (for ■ Senseki Line)				Kurihara	Miyagi Prefecture
Ichinoseki	445.1	Senseki-Tōhoku Line (for ■ Senseki Line)			Tōhoku Shinkansen; ■ Ōfunato Line	Ichinoseki	Iwate Prefecture

=== Ichinoseki – Morioka ===
All stations are located in Iwate Prefecture.

- ●: All rapid trains stop
- |: All rapid trains pass

Station	Distance from Tokyo (km)	Rapid Hamayuri	Transfers	Location
Ichinoseki	445.1		Tōhoku Shinkansen; ■ Ōfunato Line	Ichinoseki
Yamanome	448.0			Ichinoseki
Hiraizumi	452.3			Hiraizumi
Maesawa	459.9			Ōshū
Rikuchū-Orii	465.1			Ōshū
Mizusawa	470.1			Ōshū
Kanegasaki	477.7			Kanegasaki
Rokuhara	481.1			Kanegasaki
Kitakami	487.5		Tōhoku Shinkansen; ■ Kitakami Line	Kitakami
Murasakino	492.2			Kitakami
Hanamaki	500.0	●	■ Kamaishi Line (some through services)	Hanamaki
Hanamaki-Kūkō	505.7	|		Hanamaki
Ishidoriya	511.4	|		Hanamaki
Hizume	516.8	|		Shiwa
Shiwa-Chūō	518.6	|		Shiwa
Furudate	521.5	|		Shiwa
Yahaba	525.1	●		Yahaba
Iwate-Iioka	529.6	|		Morioka
Senbokuchō	533.5	|		Morioka
Morioka	535.3	●	Tōhoku Shinkansen; Akita Shinkansen; ■ Yamada Line; ■ Tazawako Line; Iwate Galaxy Railway Line	Morioka

== Rolling stock ==
=== Tokyo – Utsunomiya ===
- E231-1000 series EMUs
- E233-3000 series EMUs

=== Utsunomiya - Kuroiso ===
- E131-600/-680 series EMUs

Previously

- 205-600 series EMUs

From March 2013, a fleet of eight refurbished 4-car 205-600 series EMUs was phased in on Utsunomiya Line services between Koganei and Kuroiso, replacing 211 series sets.

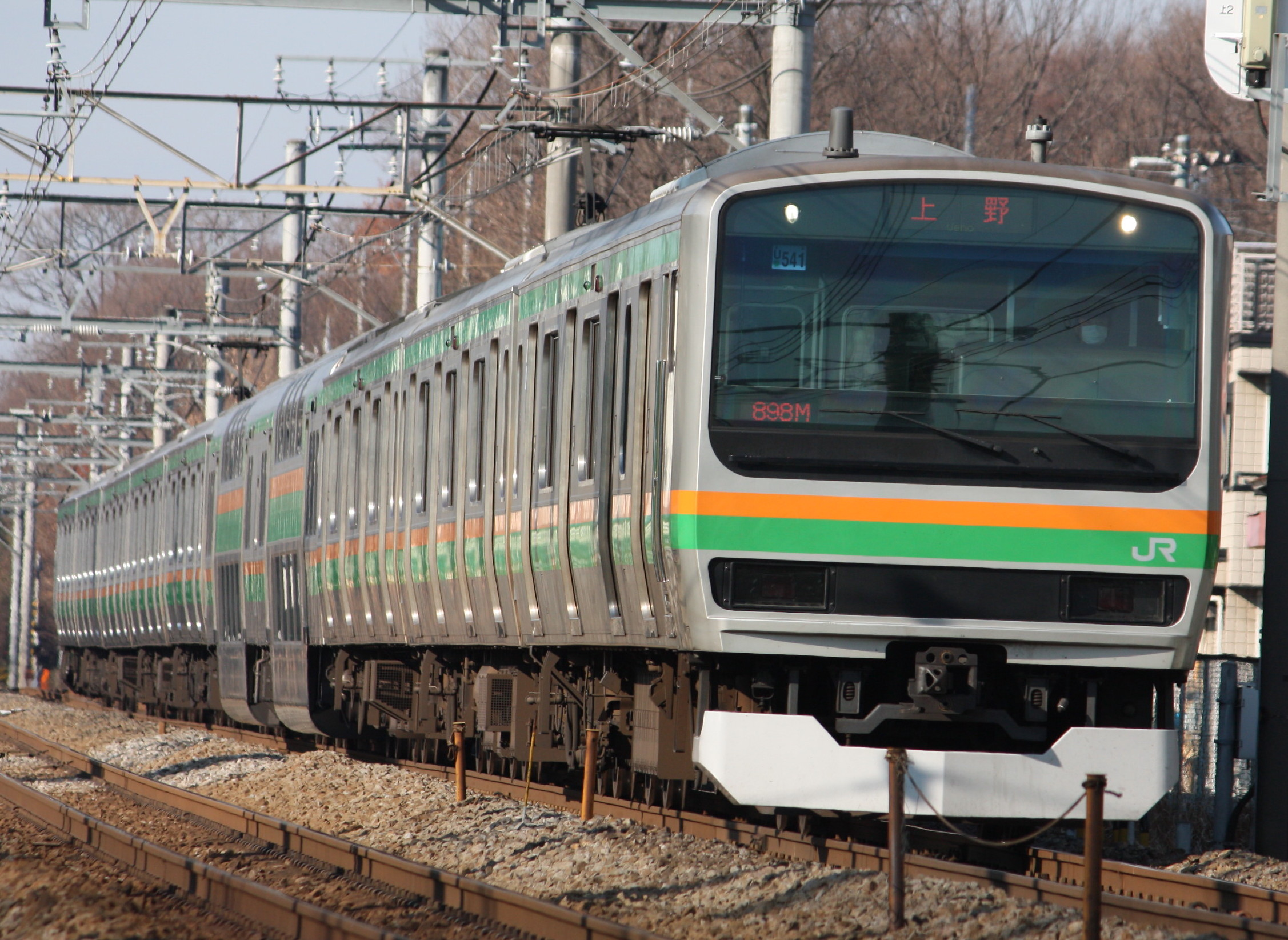
An E231-1000 series EMU

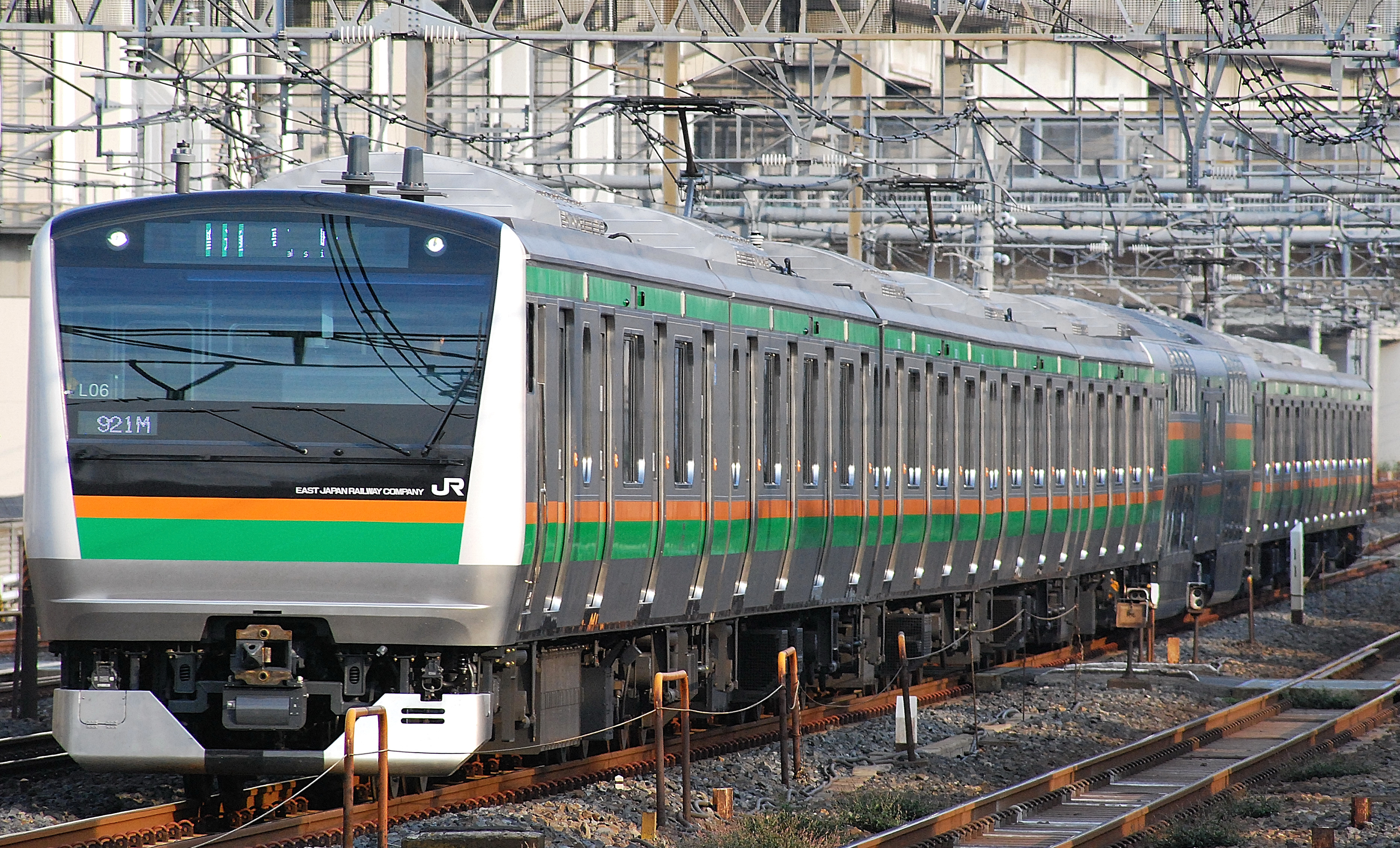
An E233-3000 series EMU

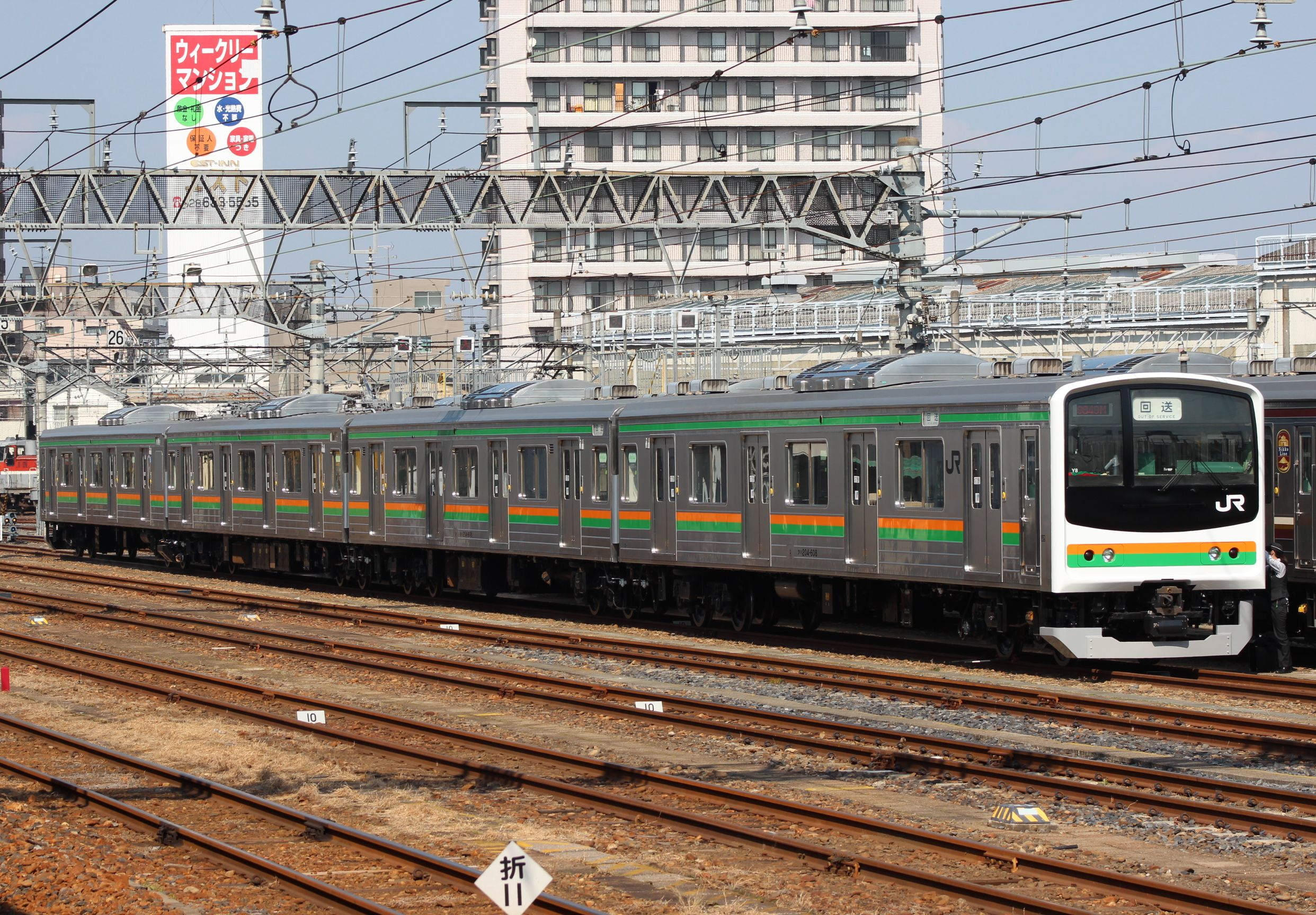
A 205-600 series EMU

=== Kuroiso – Shin-Shirakawa ===
- E531-3000 series EMUs

=== Shin-Shirakawa – Ichinoseki ===
- 701 series EMUs
- 719 series EMUs
- E721 series/ SAT721 series EMUs
- HB-E210 series DMUs - Senseki-Tōhoku Line

=== Ichinoseki – Morioka ===
- 701 series EMUs
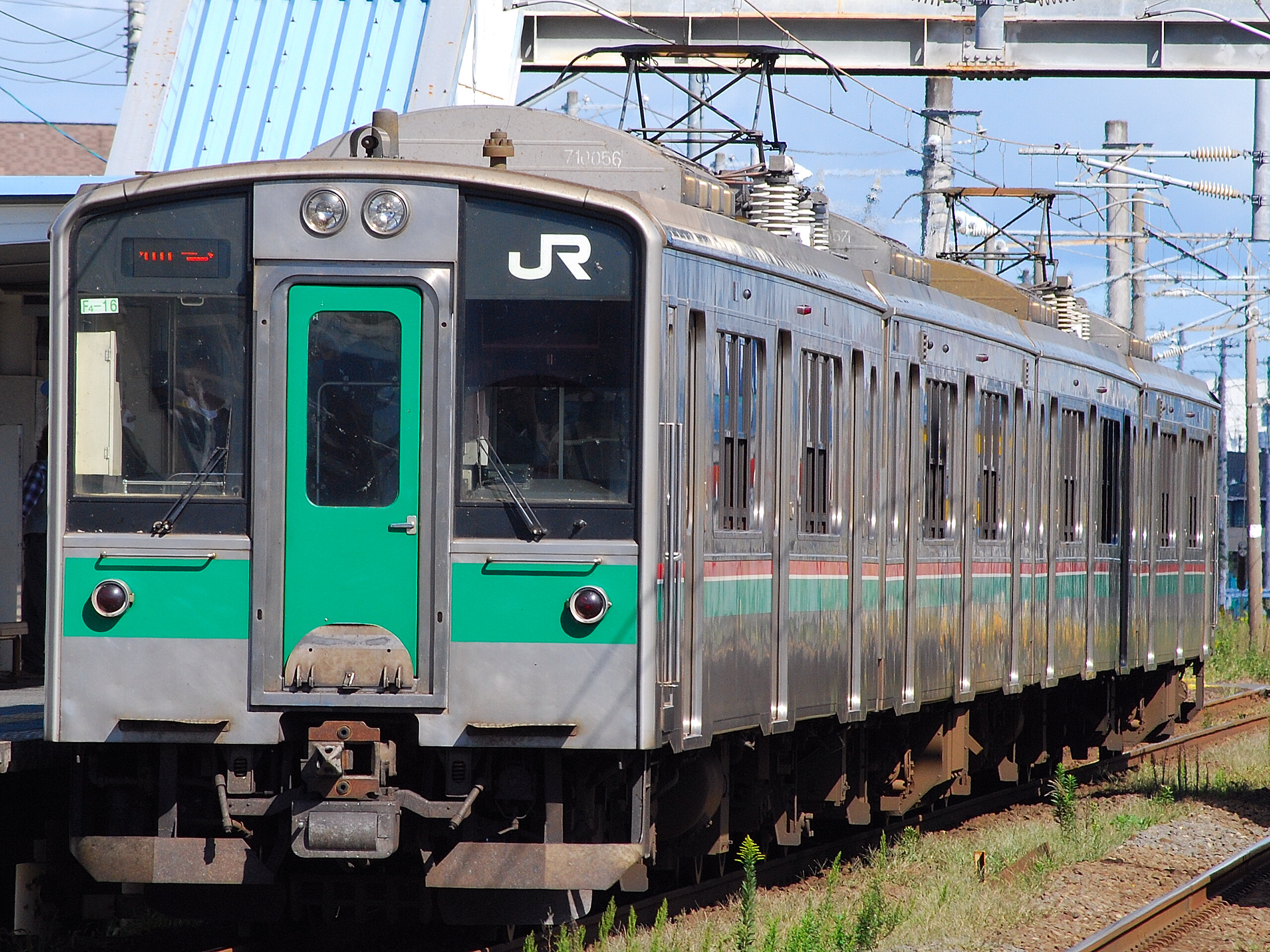
701 series (Sendai-based)

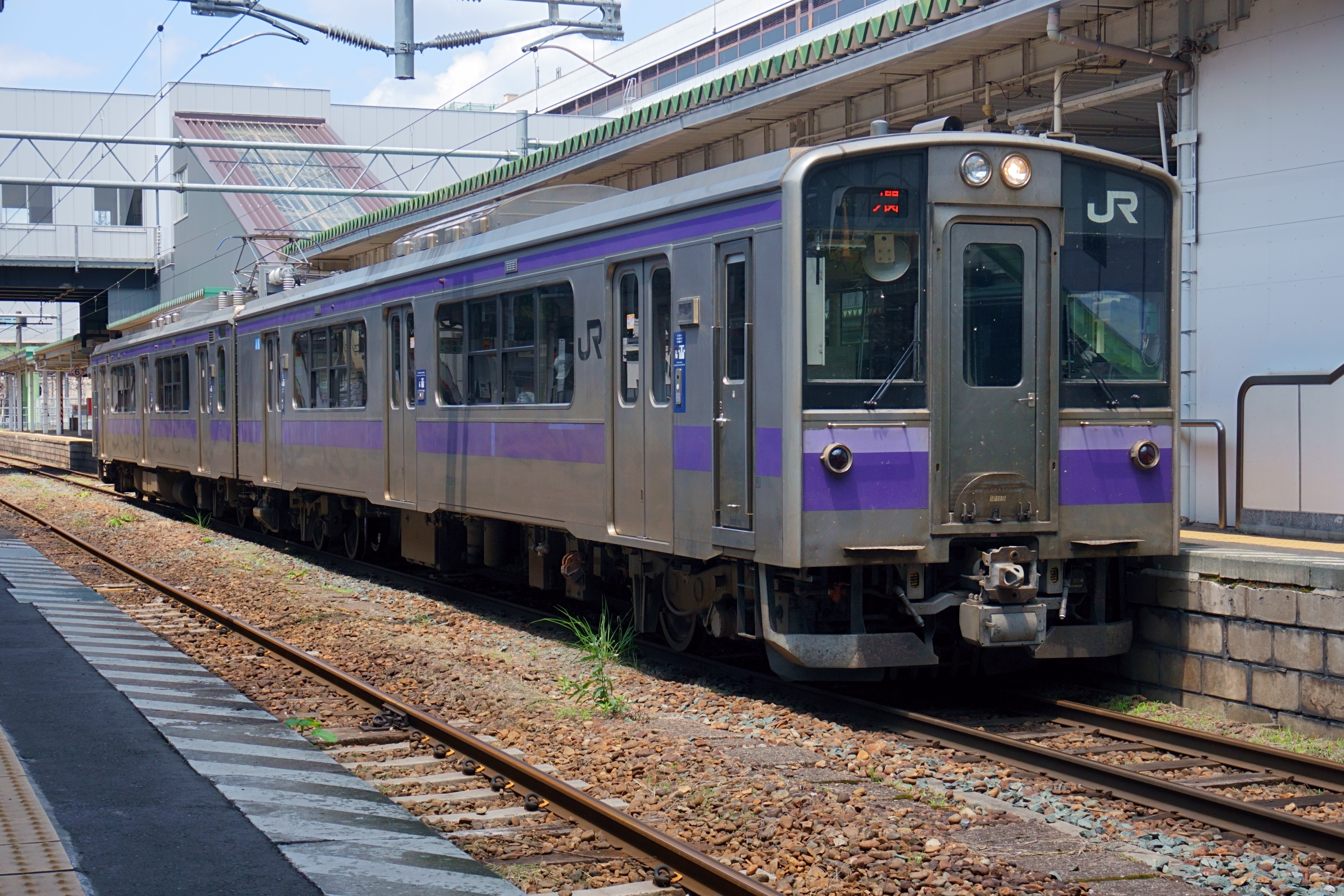
701 series (Morioka-based)

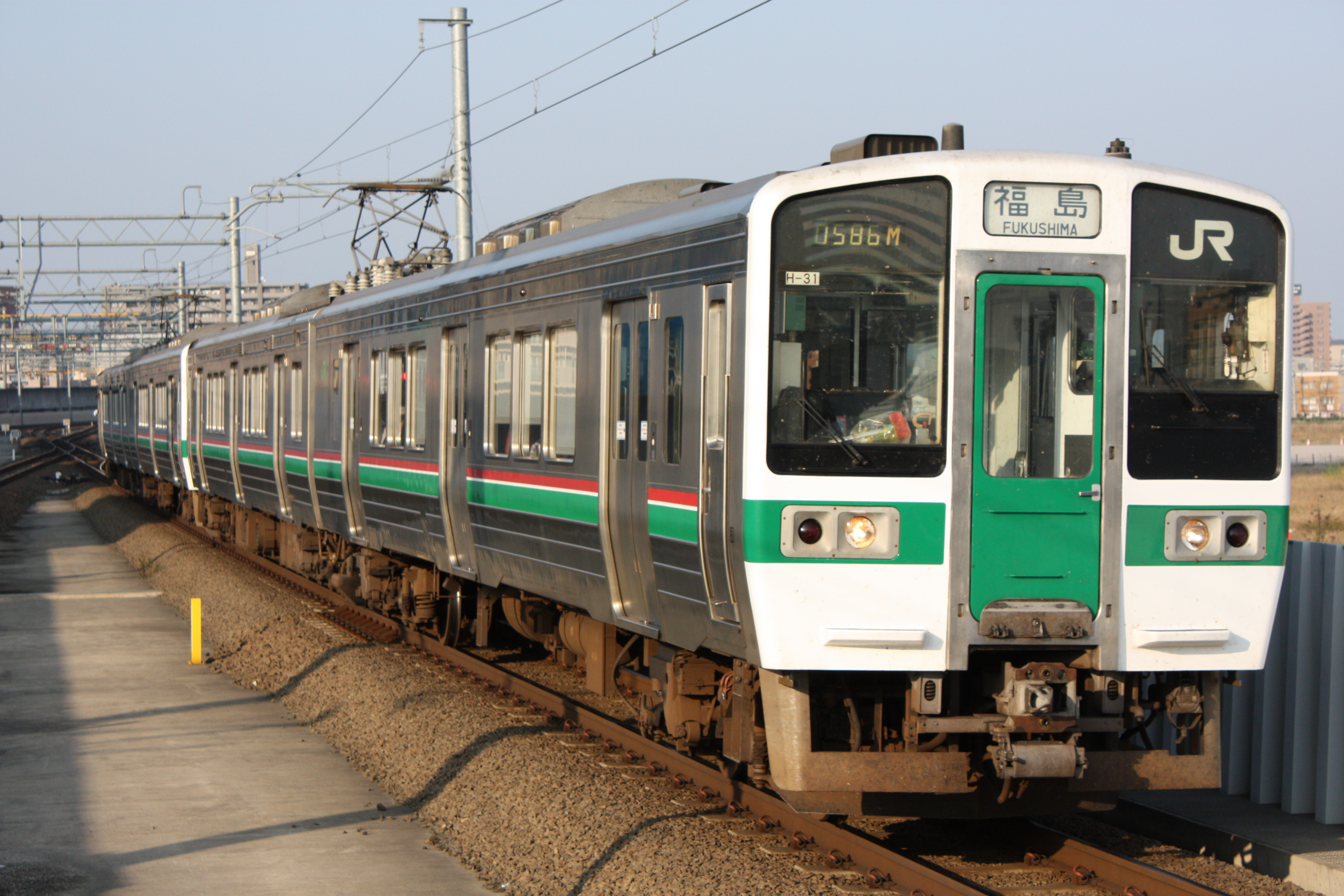
719 series

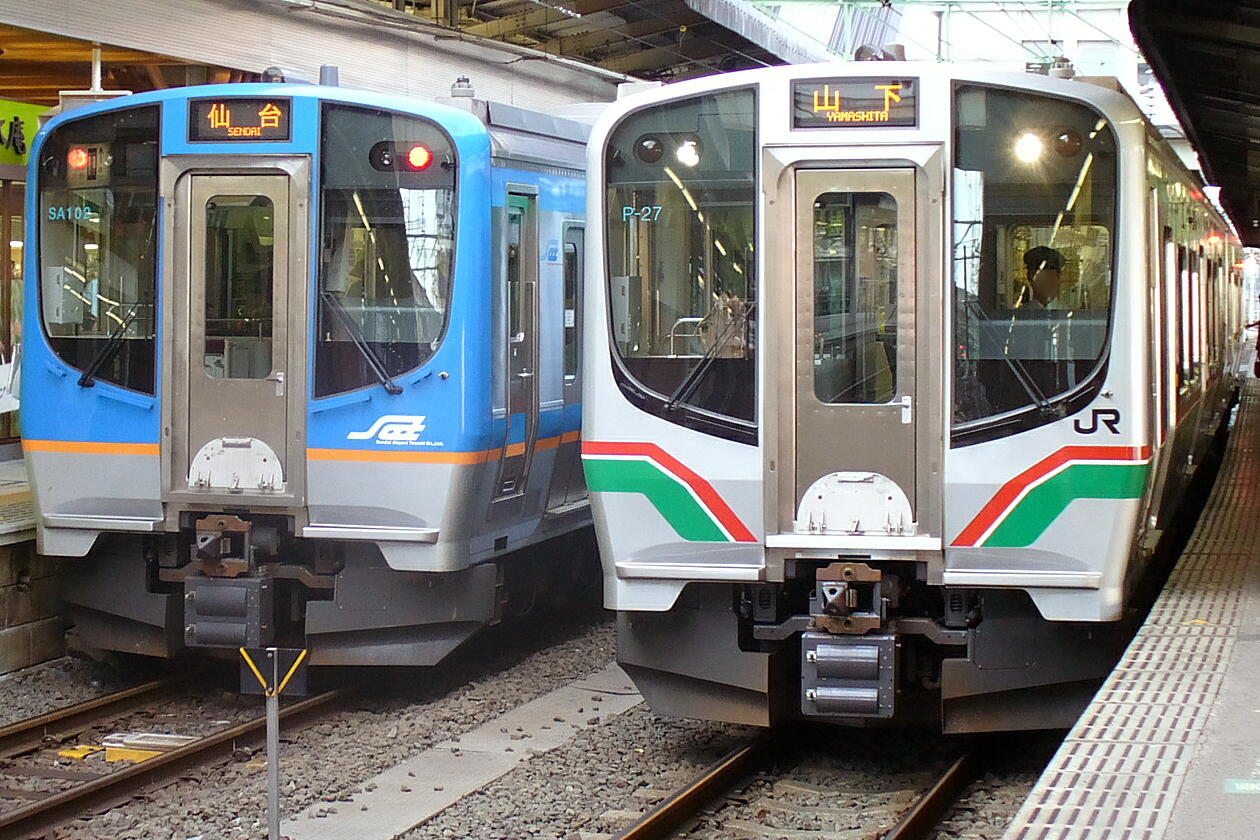
E721 series (right) and SAT721 series (left)

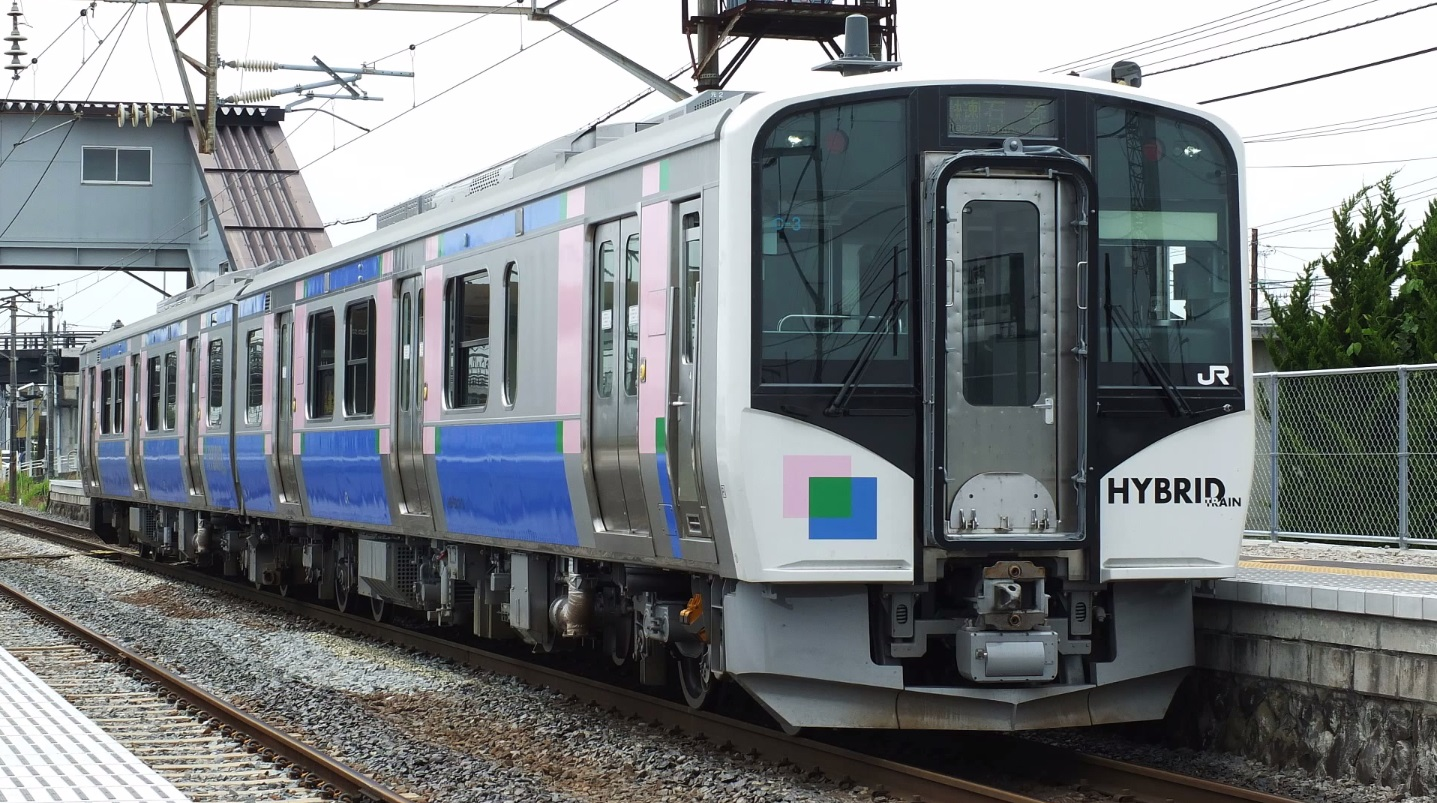
HB-E210 series hybrid DMU

== History ==
The construction of the Tōhoku Main Line began in the Kantō region and extended to the north end of Honshu, and the city of Aomori. It is one of oldest railway lines in Japan, with construction beginning in the late 19th century. Until 1 November 1906, the current Tōhoku Main Line was run by a private company Nippon Railway.

In 1883, the first segment between Ueno and Kumagaya opened. In 1885, it was extended to Utsunomiya, but the Tone River had to be crossed by boat. Following construction of the Tone River Bridge in 1886, Utsunomiya and Ueno were directly connected. The line gradually extended further to the north; to Kōriyama, Sendai, Ichinoseki and Morioka. In 1891, the segment between Morioka and Aomori opened, creating the longest continuous railway line in Japan.

After 1906, the line was nationalized and became the Tōhoku Main Line operated by the Ministry of Railways. When Tokyo Station opened in 1925, the Tōhoku Main Line was extended from Ueno to the new station. Until the 1950s, this segment was used and many trains ran through both the Tōkaidō Main Line and Tōhoku Main Line. However, when the Tōhoku Shinkansen opened, it occupied land previously used for the tracks of mid and long-distance Tōhoku Main Line trains. As a result, only a small number of commuter lines (such as the Keihin–Tōhoku Line) operated from Ueno to Tokyo, making Tokyo Station's status as part of the Tōhoku Main Line somewhat circumspect, until the Ueno–Tokyo Line opened in 2015, connecting the two stations (with the exception of the occasional train that terminates at Ueno Station).

In 2002, the Tōhoku Shinkansen was extended from Morioka to Hachinohe and the operations of the local track segment between those two cities was turned over to Iwate Ginga Railway (IGR) and Aoimori Railway. With the extension of the Tōhoku Shinkansen to Shin-Aomori station in 2010, the segment between Hachinohe and Aomori was delegated to the Aoimori Railway Company. The shortened Tōhoku Main Line is now the second-longest line in Japan, after the Sanin Main Line.

=== Double-tracking ===
The Tokyo to Omiya section was double-tracked between 1892 and 1896, extended to Koga in 1908, Oyama the following year, and to Utsunomiya in 1913.

The Iwanuma - Sendai - Iwakiri section was double-tracked between 1920 & 1923 and the Utsunomiya - Iwanuma section between 1959 and 1964. The Iwakiri - Morioka - Aomori section was double-tracked between 1951 and 1968, including the 17 km (11 mi) realigned section between Iwakiri and Atago in 1962.

=== Electrification ===
The 7 km (4.3 mi) Tokyo to Tabata section was electrified at 1,500 V DC in 1909, extended to Akabane in 1928, Omiya in 1932 and Kuroiso in 1959. Electrification was then continued north at 20 kV AC, reaching Fukushima in 1960, Sendai in 1961, Morioka in 1965, and Aomori in 1968.

=== Former connecting lines ===
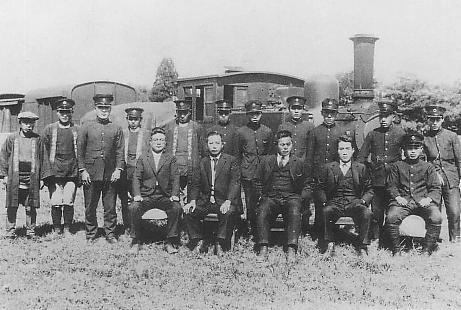
The staff of the Bushu Railway in 1927

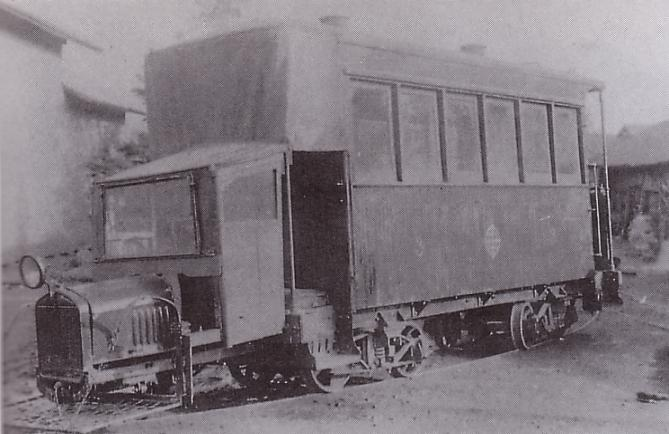
The railcar used on the Tsukinoki to Tateyama line

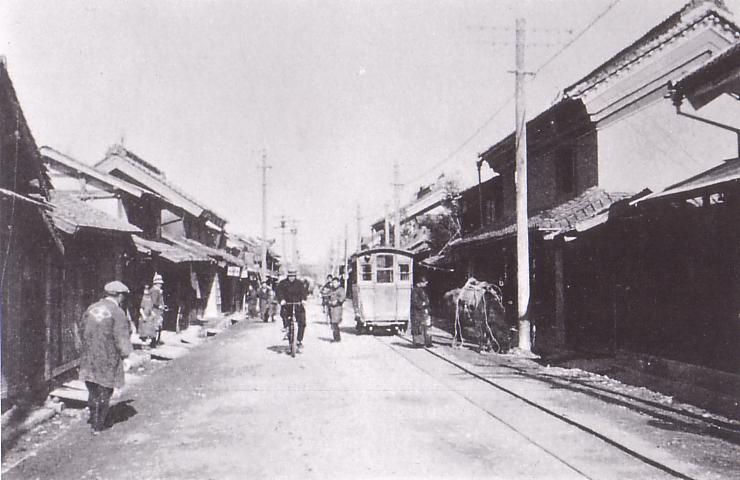
The Matsushima-Machi handcar tramway

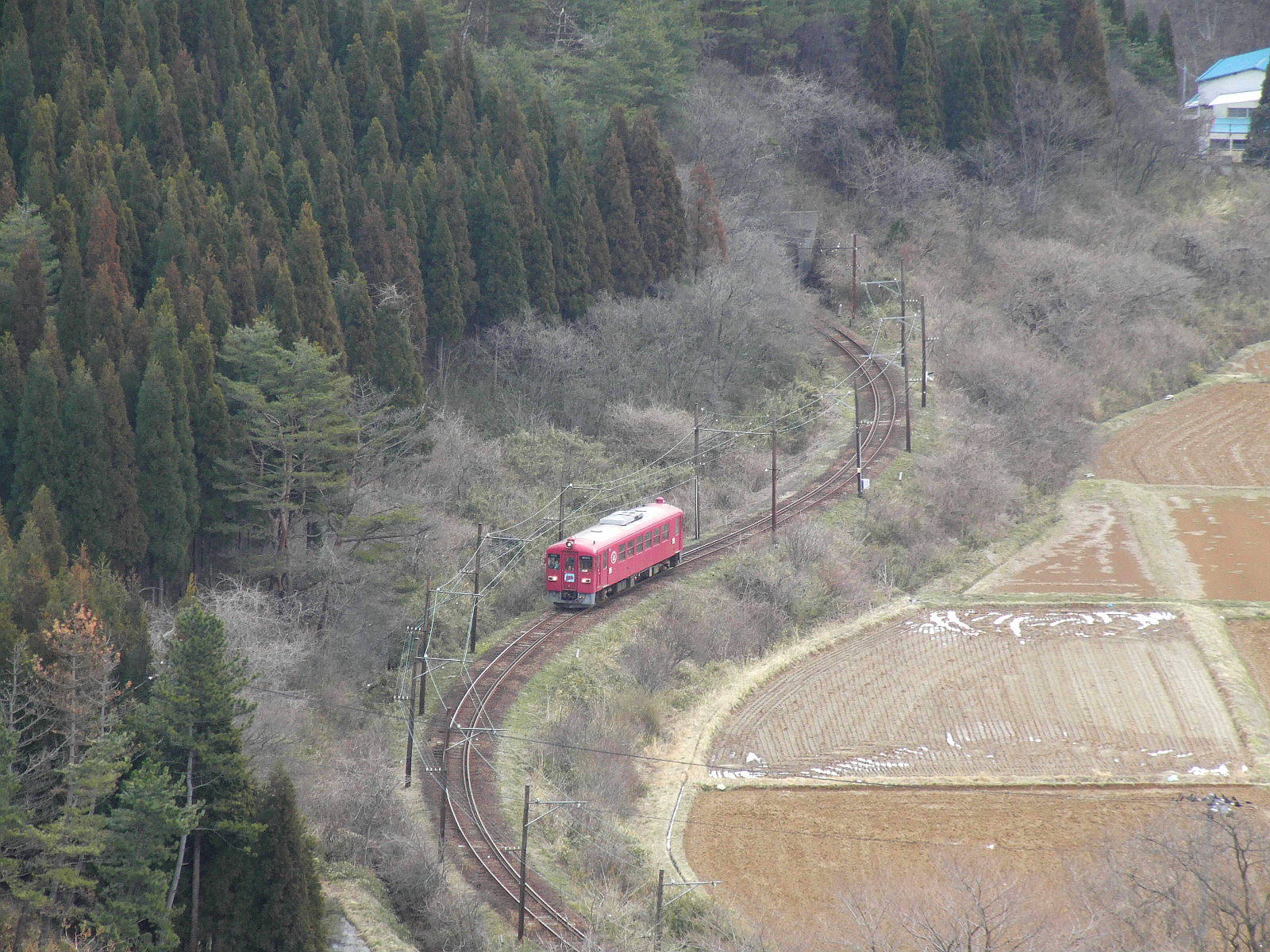
A train on the Kurihara Railway in April 2006

==== Saitama Prefecture ====
- Hasuda Station: The Bushu Railway operated a 17 km (11 mi) line to Kamine from 1924 until 1938.

==== Tochigi Prefecture ====
- Mamada Station: A 2 km (1.2 mi) 610 mm (2 ft) gauge handcar line to Omoigawa operated between 1899 and 1917.
- Hoshakuji Station: A 12 km (7.5 mi) line servicing the Utsunomiya Army Airfield operated between 1942 and 1945.
- Ujiie Station: An 8 km (5.0 mi) 610 mm (2 ft) gauge handcar line operated to Kitsuregawa between 1902 and 1918.
- Yaita Station: The Tobu Railway opened the 24 km (15 mi) 762 mm (2 ft 6 in) gauge Tobu Yaita Line to Shin Takatoku (on the Tobu Kinugawa Line) on 1 March 1924. The line was converted to 1,067 mm (3 ft 6 in) gauge in 1929, and closed on 30 June 1959.
- Nishi-Nasuno Station: A 15 km (9.3 mi) line was opened by the Shiobara Railway to Shiobara in 1912. The line was electrified at 550 V DC in 1921, and closed in 1936. The Higashino Railway opened a 24 km (15 mi) line to Nasu Ogawa between 1918 and 1924, the line closing in 1968. At Otawara Station, it connected with the 762 mm (2 ft 6 in) horse-drawn tramway mentioned below for the three years they were both open. A 5 km (3.1 mi) 762 mm (2 ft 6 in) gauge handcar line to Otawara opened in 1908. In 1917, it was converted to a horse-drawn tramway, but closed in 1921. At Otawara Station, it connected with the Higashino Railway line mentioned above.

==== Fukushima Prefecture ====
- Shirakawa Station: A 23 km (14 mi) line to Iwaki Tanakura (on the Suigun Line) was opened by the Shirotana Railway in 1916. The line was nationalized in 1941, and closed in 1944. Plans to reopen the line in 1953 resulted in a decision to convert the line to a dedicated busway, which opened in 1957.
- Koriyama Station: The Fukushima Prefectural Government operated a 13 km (8.1 mi) 762 mm (2 ft 6 in) gauge line to Miharu between 1891 and 1914.
- Matsukawa Station: A 12 km (7.5 mi) line to Iwashiro Kawamata operated from 1926 until 1972.

==== Miyagi Prefecture ====
- The Miyagi Prefectural Government operated the following three lines, all utilising 762 mm (2 ft 6 in) gauge track:
  - Ogawara Station: a 27 km (17 mi) line to Toogatta opened between 1917 and 1922, and closed in 1937.
  - Tsukinoki Station: a 19 km (12 mi) line to Tateyama, opened in 1899 as a horse-drawn tramway. Steam locomotion was introduced in 1917, and the line closed in 1929.
  - Natori Station: a 6 km (3.7 mi) line to Yurage, operated from 1926 until 1939.
- Nagamachi Station: A 16 km (9.9 mi) 762 mm (2 ft 6 in) gauge horse-drawn tramway was opened to Akiu Onsen in 1912. In 1925, the Akiho Electric Railway converted the line to 1,067 mm (3 ft 6 in) gauge and electrified it at 600 V DC. The line closed in 1961.
- Kofuku-Tagajo Station: When the Tōhoku Main Line was realigned in 1956, the original line to Shiogama Wharf (on the Senseki Line) remained in place as a freight-only line, closing in 1997.
- Matsushima Station: The Miyagi Prefectural Government operated a 4 km (2.5 mi), 1,067 mm (3 ft 6 in) gauge line to Matsushima Kaigan, electrified at 550 V DC, between 1922 and 1944.
- Matsushima-Machi Station: A 2 km (1.2 mi) 610 mm (2 ft) gauge handcar line operated between 1923 and 1930.
- Kogota Station: Prior to the opening of the Rikuu East Line, a 10 km (6.2 mi) 2 ft 5 in (737 mm) gauge horse-drawn tramway operated to Furukawa between 1900 and 1913.
- Semine Station: The Senpoku Railway operated a 41 km (25 mi) 762 mm (2 ft 6 in) gauge line from Tome to Tsukidate between 1921 and 1968.
- Ishikoshi Station: The Kurihara Den'en Railway Line operated between 1921 and 2007.

==== Iwate Prefecture ====
- Hanamaki Station: An 18 km (11 mi) 762 mm (2 ft 6 in) gauge line to Nishinamari Onsen was opened in 1915 by the Hanamaki Electric Railway, which then opened a second line, 8 km to Hanamaki Onsen in 1925. Both lines were electrified at 600 V DC. The latter closed in 1972, and the former in 1976.

==== Aomori Prefecture ====
- Hachinohe Station: The Gonohe Electric Railway operated a 12 km (7.5 mi) line (not electrified, despite the company name) to Gonohe between 1929 and 1969.
- Misawa Station: The Towada Kanko Electric Railway Line operated between 1922 and 2012.
- Noheji Station: The Nanbu Jūkan Railway opened a 21 km (13 mi) line to Shichinohe in 1962. Freight services ceased in 1984, and the line closed in 1997.

== See also ==
- Utsunomiya Line
- Takasaki Line
- Shōnan–Shinjuku Line
- Ueno–Tokyo Line
