= Kosugō Station =

Railway station in Shiroishi, Miyagi Prefecture, Japan

Kosugō Station 越河駅
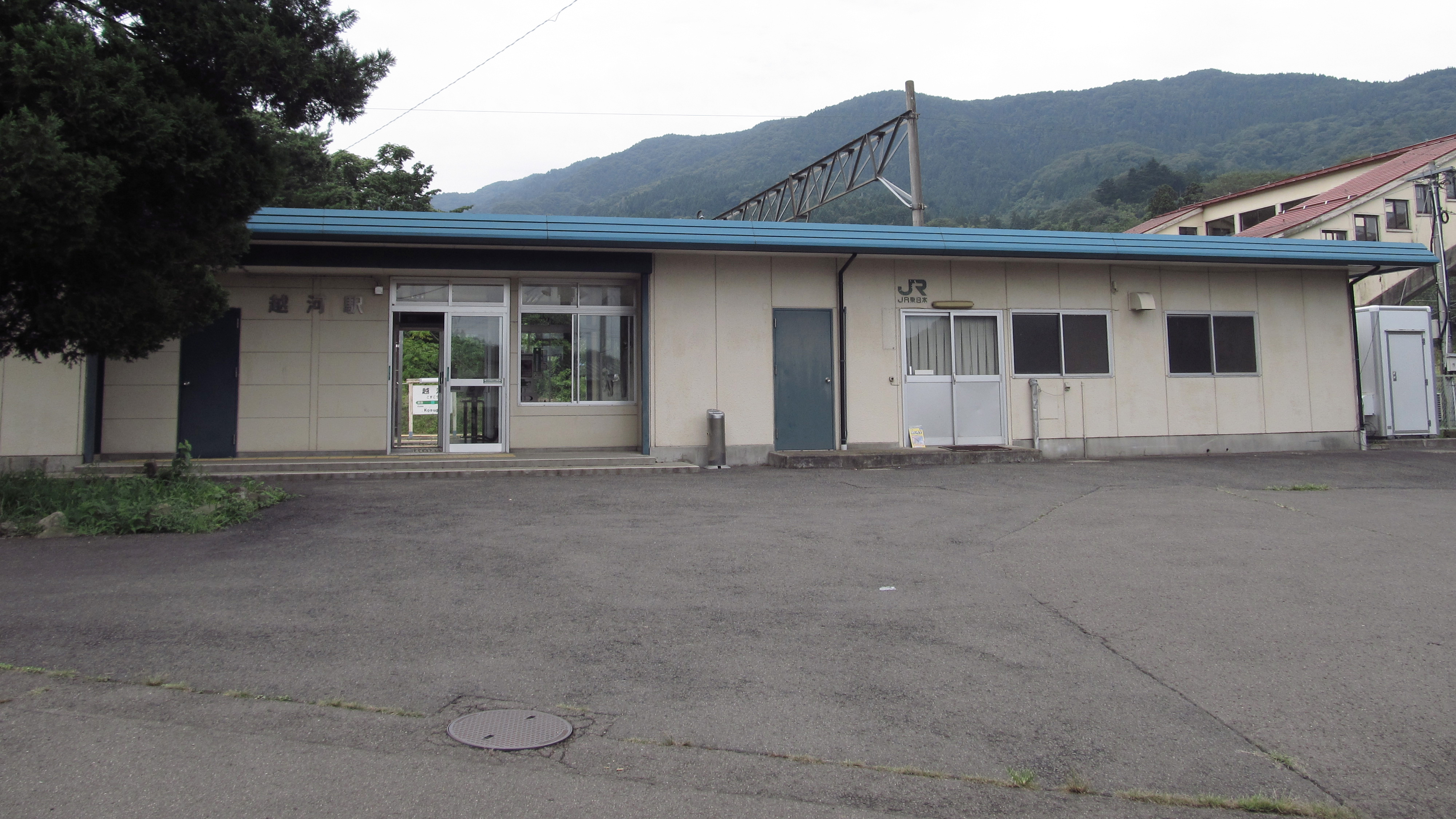
- Kosugō Station, August 2014

General information
- Location: 1-7-8 Higashi-Sendai, Shiroishi-shi, Miyagi-ken 989-0111; Japan
- Coordinates: 37°56′1.96″N 140°36′16.21″E
- Operator: JR East
- Line: ■ Tōhoku Main Line
- Distance: 298.6 km from Tokyo
- Platforms: 1 side +1 island platform
- Tracks: 3

Other information
- Status: Unstaffed
- Website: Official website

History
- Opened: January 12, 1891

Services
Preceding station	JR East	Following station
Kaida towards Kuroiso	Tōhoku Main Line Local	Shiroishi towards Morioka
Location
- Location within Miyagi Prefecture Location within Japan

Kosugō Station (越河駅, Kosugō-eki) is a railway station in the city of Shiroishi, Miyagi Prefecture, Japan, operated by East Japan Railway Company (JR East).

== Lines ==
Kosugō Station is served by the Tōhoku Main Line, and is located 298.6 rail kilometers from the official starting point of the line at Tokyo.

== Station layout ==
The station has one side platform and one island platform connected to the station building by a footbridge. The station is unattended.

=== Platforms ===
1	■ Tōhoku Main Line	for Fukushima, Kōriyama
2	■ Tōhoku Main Line	for Fukushima, Kōriyama for Shiroishi Iwanuma and Sendai
3	■ Tōhoku Main Line	for Shiroishi, Iwanuma, Sendai

== History ==
Kosugō Station opened on January 12, 1891. A new station building was completed in March 1985. The station was absorbed into the JR East network upon the privatization of the Japanese National Railways (JNR) on April 1, 1987.

== Surrounding area ==
- National Route 4

== See also ==
- List of railway stations in Japan
