= Higashi-Shiroishi Station =

Railway station in Shiroishi, Miyagi Prefecture, Japan

Higashi-Shiroishi Station 東白石駅
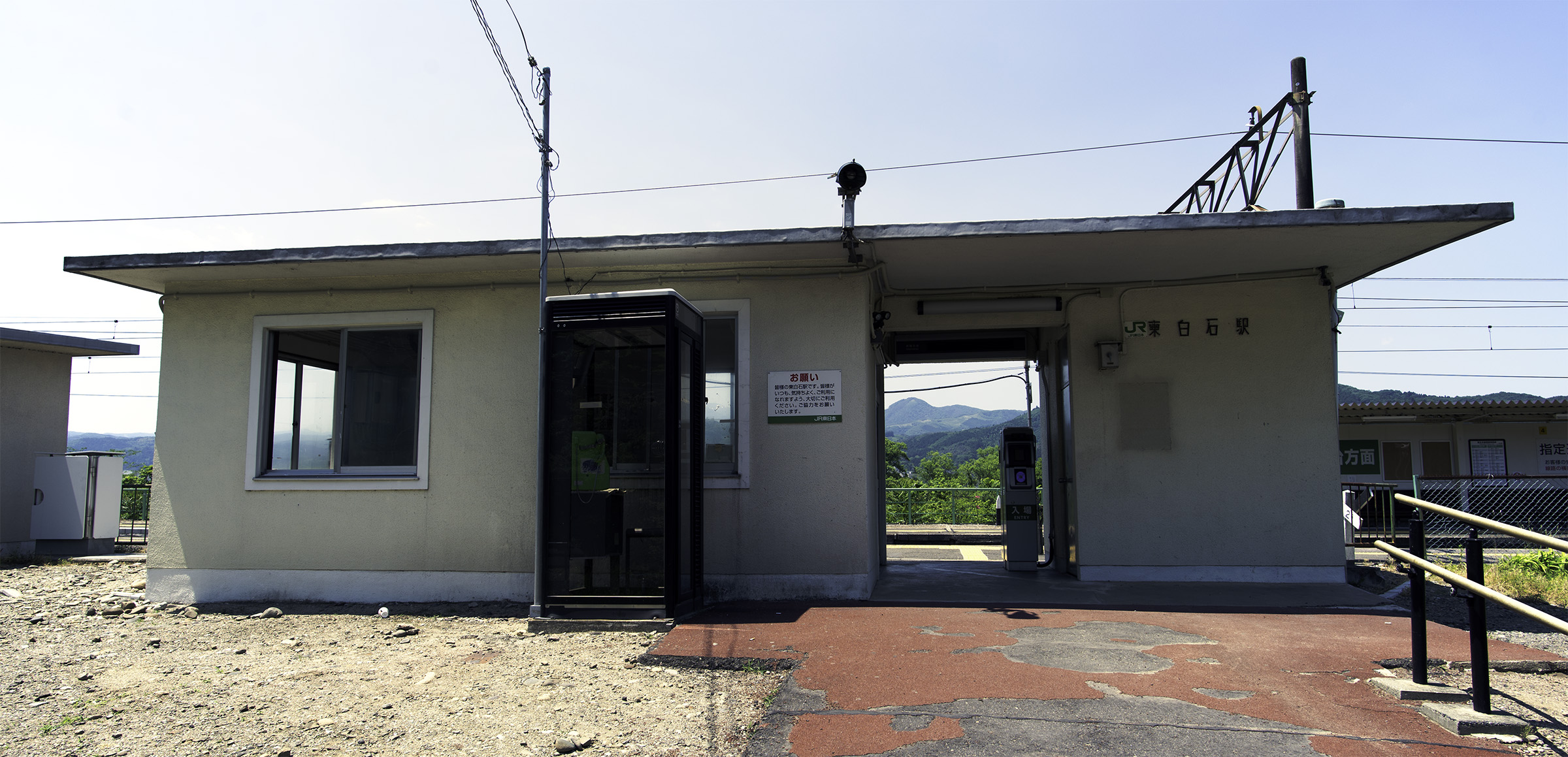
- Higashi-Shiroishi Station

General information
- Location: Shirakawa-uchioya, Shiroishi-shi, Miyagi-ken 989-1104; Japan
- Coordinates: 38°02′5.73″N 140°39′4.02″E
- Operator: JR East
- Line: ■ Tōhoku Main Line
- Distance: 311.0 km from Tokyo
- Platforms: 2 side platforms
- Tracks: 2

Other information
- Status: Unstaffed
- Website: Official website

History
- Opened: December 20, 1961

Services
Preceding station	JR East	Following station
Shiroishi towards Kuroiso	Tōhoku Main Line Local	Kita-Shirakawa towards Morioka
Location
- Location within Miyagi Prefecture Location within Japan

Higashi-Shiroishi Station (東白石駅, Higashi-Shiroishi-eki) is a railway station in the city of Shiroishi, Miyagi Prefecture, Japan, operated by East Japan Railway Company (JR East).

== Lines ==
Higashi-Shiroishi Station is served by the Tōhoku Main Line, and is located 311.0 rail kilometers from the official starting point of the line at Tokyo.

== Station layout ==
The station has two opposed side platforms connected to the station building by a footbridge. The station is unattended.

=== Platforms ===
1	■ Tōhoku Main Line	for Shiroishi, Fukushima, Kōriyama
2	■ Tōhoku Main Line	for Iwanuma,Natori and Sendai

== History ==
Higashi-Shiroishi Station opened on December 20, 1961. The station was absorbed into the JR East network upon the privatization of the Japanese National Railways (JNR) on April 1, 1987.

== Surrounding area ==
- National Route 4

== See also ==
- List of railway stations in Japan
