= Ōgawara Station =

Railway station in Ōgawara, Miyagi Prefecture, Japan

Ōgawara Station 大河原駅
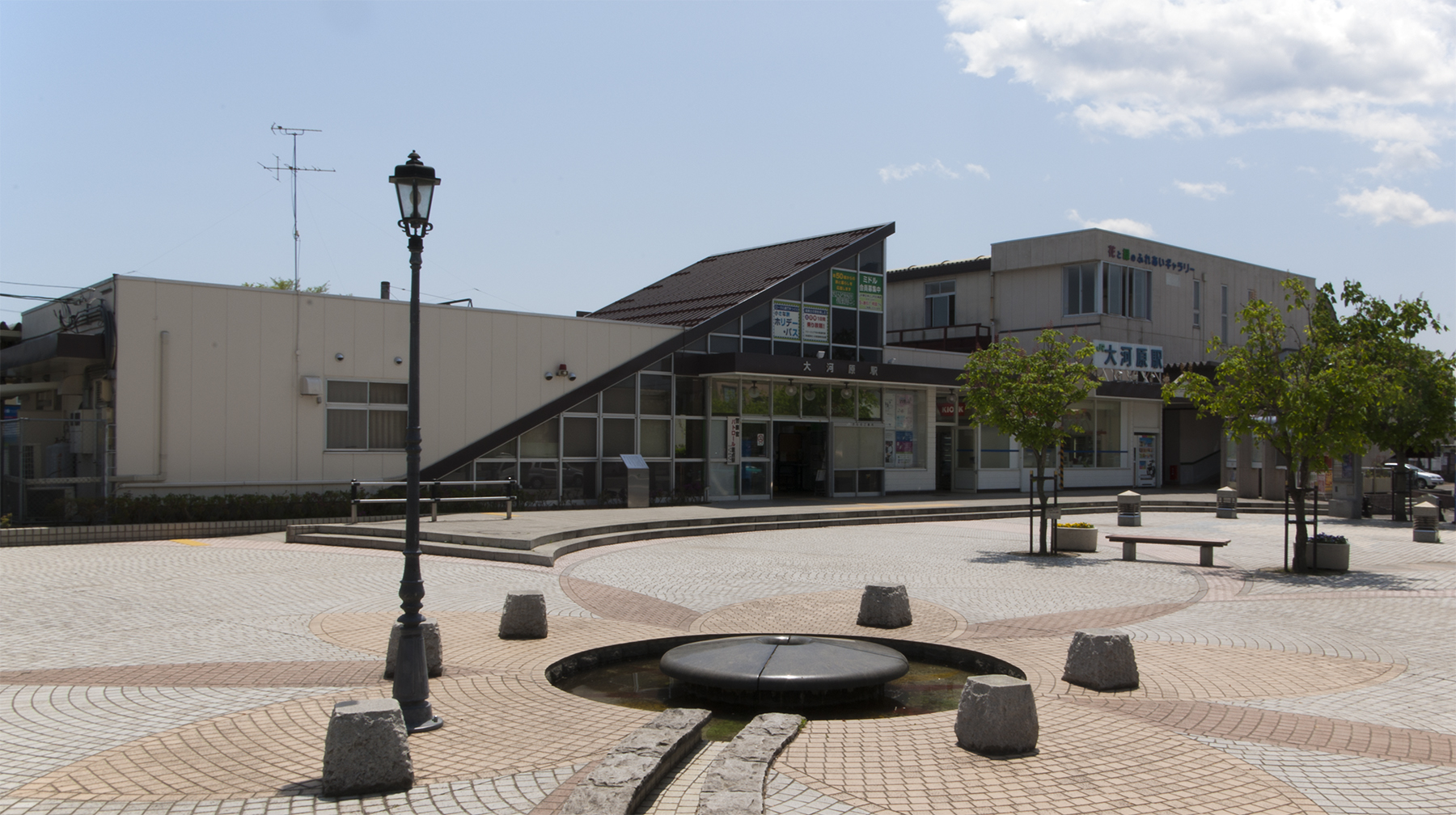
- Ōgawara Station, May 2010

General information
- Location: Ōya, Ōgawara-machi, Miyagi-gun, Miyagi-ken 989-1201; Japan
- Coordinates: 38°02′50.43″N 140°44′24.03″E
- Operator: JR East
- Line: ■ Tōhoku Main Line
- Distance: 320.1 km from Tokyo
- Platforms: 1 side +1 island platform
- Tracks: 3

Other information
- Status: Staffed ("Midori no Madoguchi")
- Website: Official website

History
- Opened: December 15, 1887

Passengers
- FY2018: 3344 daily

Services
Preceding station	JR East	Following station
Shiroishi towards Fukushima	Tōhoku Main Line Rapid City Rabbit	Funaoka towards Sendai
Kita-Shirakawa towards Kuroiso	Tōhoku Main Line Local	Funaoka towards Morioka
Location
- Location within Miyagi Prefecture Location within Japan

Ōgawara Station (大河原駅, Ōgawara-eki) is a railway station in the town of Ōgawara, Miyagi Prefecture, Japan, operated by East Japan Railway Company (JR East).

== Lines ==
Ōgawara Station is served by the Tōhoku Main Line, and is located 320.1 rail kilometers from the official starting point of the line at Tokyo.

== Station layout ==
The station has a single side platform and an island platform connected to the station building by a footbridge. The station has a Midori no Madoguchi staffed ticket office.

=== Platforms ===
1	■ Tōhoku Main Line	for Iwanuma,Natori and Sendai
2, 3	■ Tōhoku Main Line	for Shiroishi, Fukushima, Kōriyama

== History ==
Ōgawara Station opened on December 15, 1887. The station was absorbed into the JR East network upon the privatization of the Japanese National Railways (JNR) on April 1, 1987.

== Passenger statistics ==
In fiscal 2018, the station was used by an average of 3,344 passengers daily (boarding passengers only).

== Surrounding area ==
- Ōgawara Post Office

== See also ==
- List of railway stations in Japan
