= Shiroishi Station (Miyagi) =

Railway station in Shiroishi, Miyagi Prefecture, Japan

Shiroishi Station 白石駅
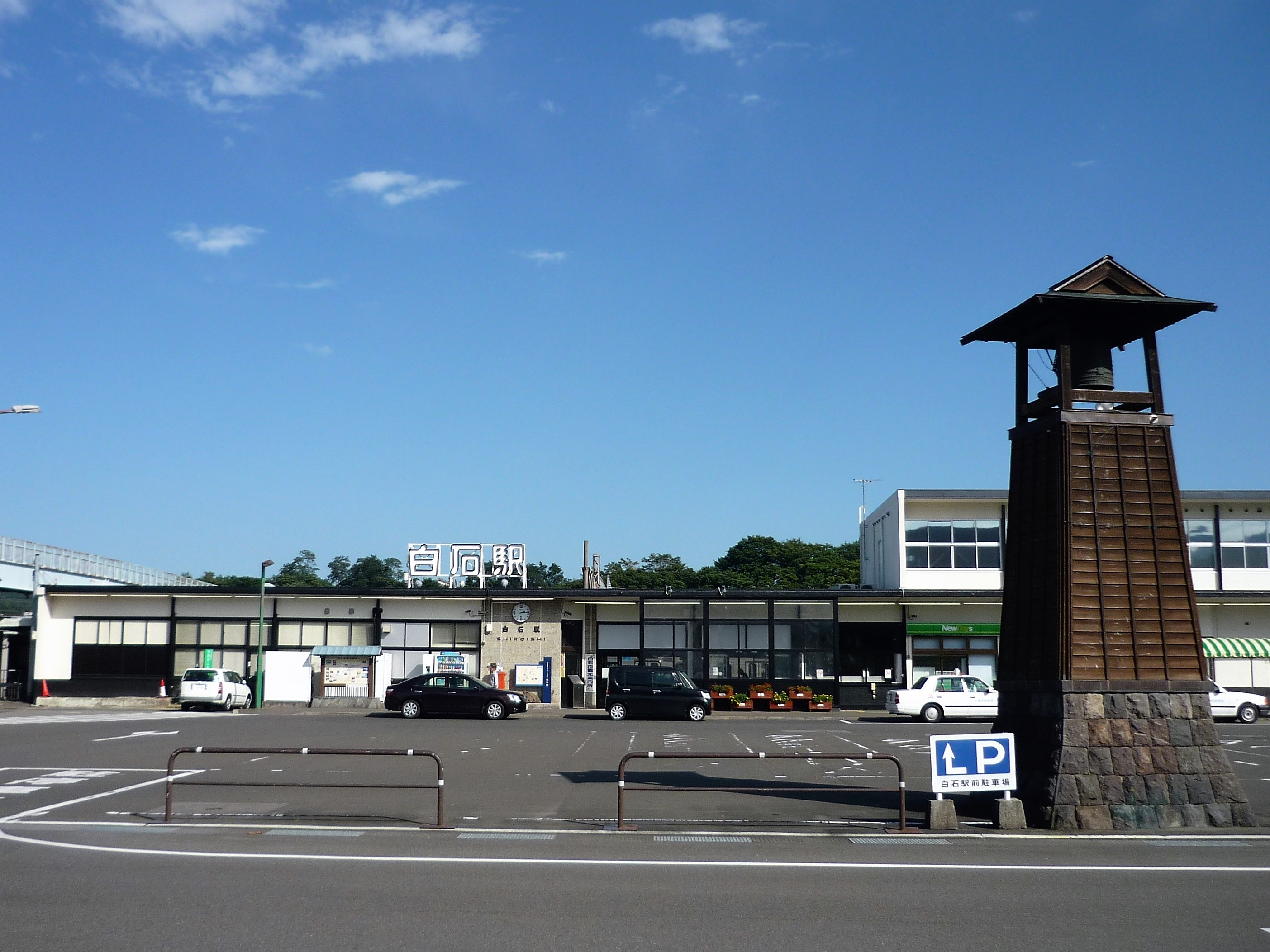
- Shiroishi Station, September 2018

General information
- Location: 137 Sawame, Shiroishi-shi, Miyagi-ken 989-0243; Japan
- Coordinates: 38°00′12.61″N 140°37′34.23″E
- Operator: JR East
- Line: ■ Tōhoku Main Line
- Distance: 306.8 km from Tokyo
- Platforms: 1 side +1 island platform
- Tracks: 3

Other information
- Status: Staffed ("Midori no Madoguchi")
- Website: Official website

History
- Opened: December 15, 1887

Passengers
- FY2018: 2892 daily

Services
Preceding station	JR East	Following station
Fujita towards Fukushima	Tōhoku Main Line Rapid City Rabbit	Ōgawara towards Sendai
Kosugō towards Kuroiso	Tōhoku Main Line Local	Higashi-Shiroishi towards Morioka
Location
- Location within Miyagi Prefecture Location within Japan

Shiroishi Station (白石駅, Shiroishi-eki) is a railway station in the city of Shiroishi, Miyagi Prefecture, Japan, operated by East Japan Railway Company (JR East). This station is the central station in Shiroishi city, and the nearest station to Shiroishi Castle in the city center.

== Lines ==
Shiroishi Station is served by the Tōhoku Main Line, and is located 306.8 rail kilometers from the official starting point of the line at Tokyo.

== Station layout ==
The station has one side platform and one island platform connected to the station building by a footbridge. The station has a Midori no Madoguchi staffed ticket office.

=== Platforms ===
1	■ Tōhoku Main Line	for Iwanuma, Natori and Sendai
2	■ Tōhoku Main Line	siding
3	■ Tōhoku Main Line	for Fukushima, Kōriyama for Iwanuma, Natori and Sendai

== Transportation characteristics at this station ==
- This station is the base station for operation in the southern part of Miyagi prefecture, and about half of the regular trains passing through this station (for Sendai) are the first train departing from this station.
- Upbound (for Fujita, Date, Fukushima & Kōriyama)
  - One regular train (bound for Fukushima, some bound for Koriyama) stops approximately every 1–2 hours. Some trains are departing from Sendai-transfer to this station-bound for Fukushima. During certain hours, Rapid "Sendai City Rabbit" (for Fukushima) also stops.
- Downbound (for Ogawara, Tsukinoki, Iwanuma, Natori & Sendai)
  - In general, two regular trains (for Sendai) stop every hour, and about half of the trains depart from the station. During some hours, the rapid “Sendai City Rabbit” (for Sendai) also stops.

== History ==
Shiroishi Station opened on December 15, 1887. On October 25, 1970 a Sister station relationship with JR Shiroishi Station in Hokkaidō was established. The station was absorbed into the JR East network upon the privatization of the Japanese National Railways (JNR) on April 1, 1987.

== Passenger statistics ==
In fiscal 2018, the station was used by an average of 2,892 passengers daily (boarding passengers only). Data for previous years is as follows:

Passenger Change
Year	Daily Average Number of Passengers
2000	3590
2005	3240
2010	2897
2015	2908

== Surrounding area ==
- National Route 113
- Shiroishi City Hall
- Shiroishi Post Office

== See also ==
- List of railway stations in Japan
