= List of cities in Miyagi Prefecture by population =

The following list sorts all cities (including towns and villages) in the Japanese prefecture of Miyagi with a population of more than 10,000 according to the 2020 Census. As of October 1, 2020, 29 places fulfill this criterion and are listed here. This list refers only to the population of individual cities, towns and villages within their defined limits, which does not include other municipalities or suburban areas within urban agglomerations.

== List ==
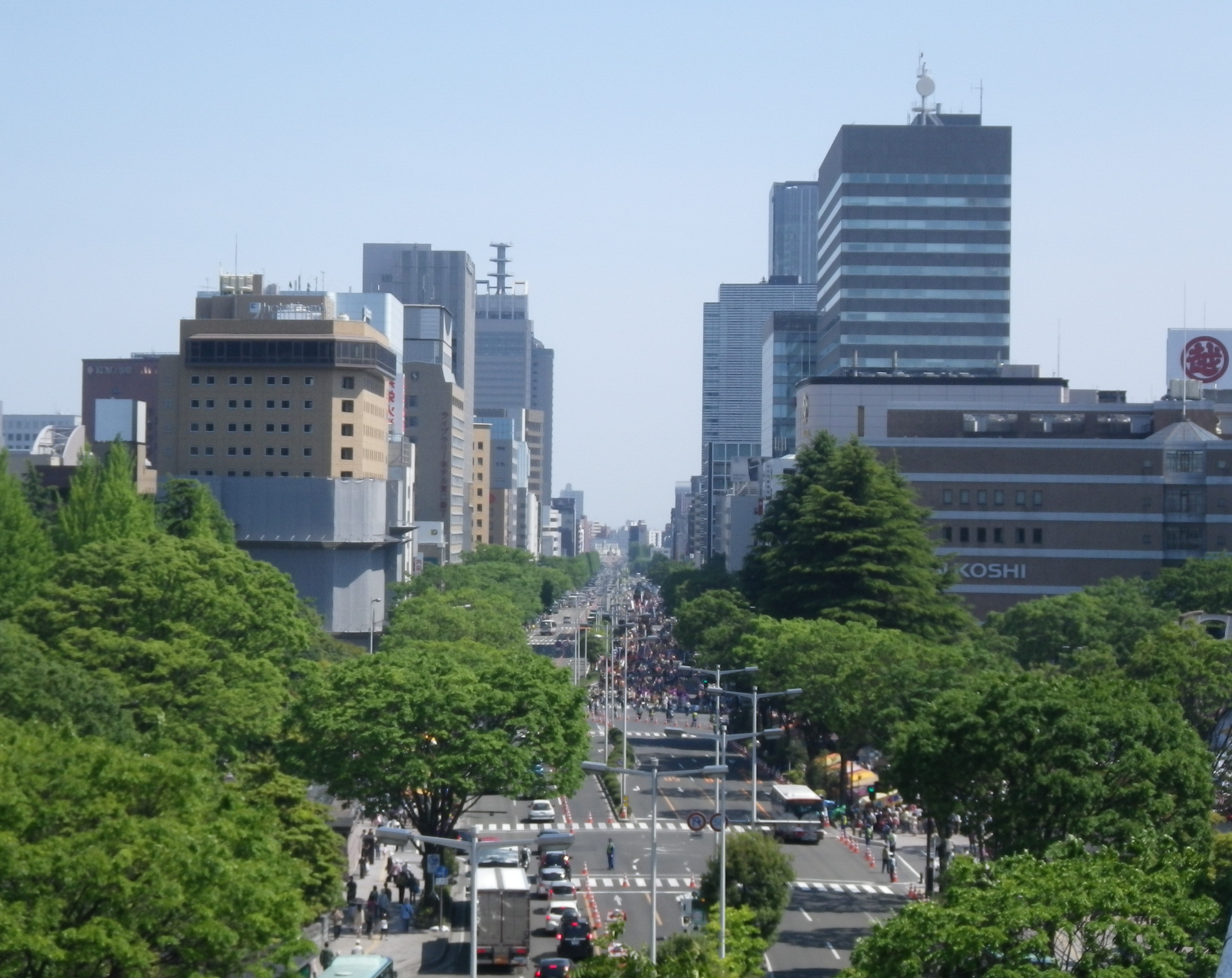
Sendai

The following table lists the 29 cities, villages and towns in Miyagi with a population of at least 10,000 on October 1, 2020, according to the 2020 Census. The table also gives an overview of the evolution of the population since the 1995 census.

Rank (2020)	Name	Status	2020	2015	2010	2005	2000	1995
1	Sendai	City	1,097,196	1,082,159	1,045,986	1,025,126	1,008,130	971,297
2	Ishinomaki	City	140,237	147,214	160,826	167,324	174,778	178,923
3	Ōsaki	City	127,381	133,391	135,147	138,491	139,313	138,068
4	Natori	City	78,757	76,668	73,134	68,662	67,216	61,993
5	Tome	City	76,103	81,959	83,969	89,316	93,769	96,832
6	Kurihara	City	64,686	69,906	74,932	80,248	84,947	88,552
7	Tagajō	City	63,276	62,096	63,060	62,717	61,457	60,625
8	Kesennuma	City	61,171	64,988	73,489	78,011	82,394	84,848
9	Shiogama	City	52,249	54,187	56,490	59,357	61,547	63,566
10	Tomiya	City	51,659	51,591	47,042	41,593	35,909	30,224
11	Iwanuma	City	44,091	44,678	44,187	43,921	41,407	40,072
12	Higashimatsushima	City	39,121	39,503	42,903	43,235	43,180	42,778
13	Shibata	Town	38,264	39,525	39,341	39,809	39,485	38,749
14	Rifu	Town	35,189	35,835	33,994	32,257	29,848	25,135
15	Watari	Town	33,098	33,589	34,845	35,132	34,770	33,034
16	Shiroishi	City	32,734	35,272	37,422	39,492	40,793	41,852
17	Taiwa	Town	28,786	28,244	24,894	24,509	24,410	22,856
18	Kakuda	City	27,996	30,180	31,336	33,199	34,354	35,316
19	Misato	Town	24,011	24,852	25,190	26,329	27,395	27,980
20	Ōgawara	Town	23,575	23,798	23,530	23,335	22,767	21,995
21	Kami	Town	21,952	23,743	25,527	27,212	28,330	29,466
22	Shichigahama	Town	18,136	18,652	20,416	21,068	21,131	20,668
23	Wakuya	Town	15,401	16,701	17,494	18,410	19,313	20,170
24	Matsushima	Town	13,341	14,421	15,085	16,193	17,059	17,344
25	Marumori	Town	12,268	13,972	15,501	16,792	17,868	18,941
26	Minamisanriku	Town	12,230	12,370	17,429	18,645	19,860	20,428
27	Yamamoto	Town	12,051	12,315	16,704	17,713	18,537	18,815
28	Zaō	Town	11,428	12,316	12,882	13,318	13,545	13,915
29	Murata	Town	10,670	11,501	11,995	12,740	13,166	13,539
