= Akiu =

Akiu may refer to:

- Akiu, Miyagi, town in Natori District, Miyagi Prefecture, Japan
- Akiu no Taue Odori, traditional rice-planting dance in Akiu, Miyagi
- Akiu Great Falls, waterfall in Sendai, Miyagi Prefecture, Japan
- Mike Akiu (born 1962), American football player
