= Zaō Kōgen Prefectural Natural Park =

Natural park of Miyagi prefecture, Japan

- 蔵王高原県立自然公園
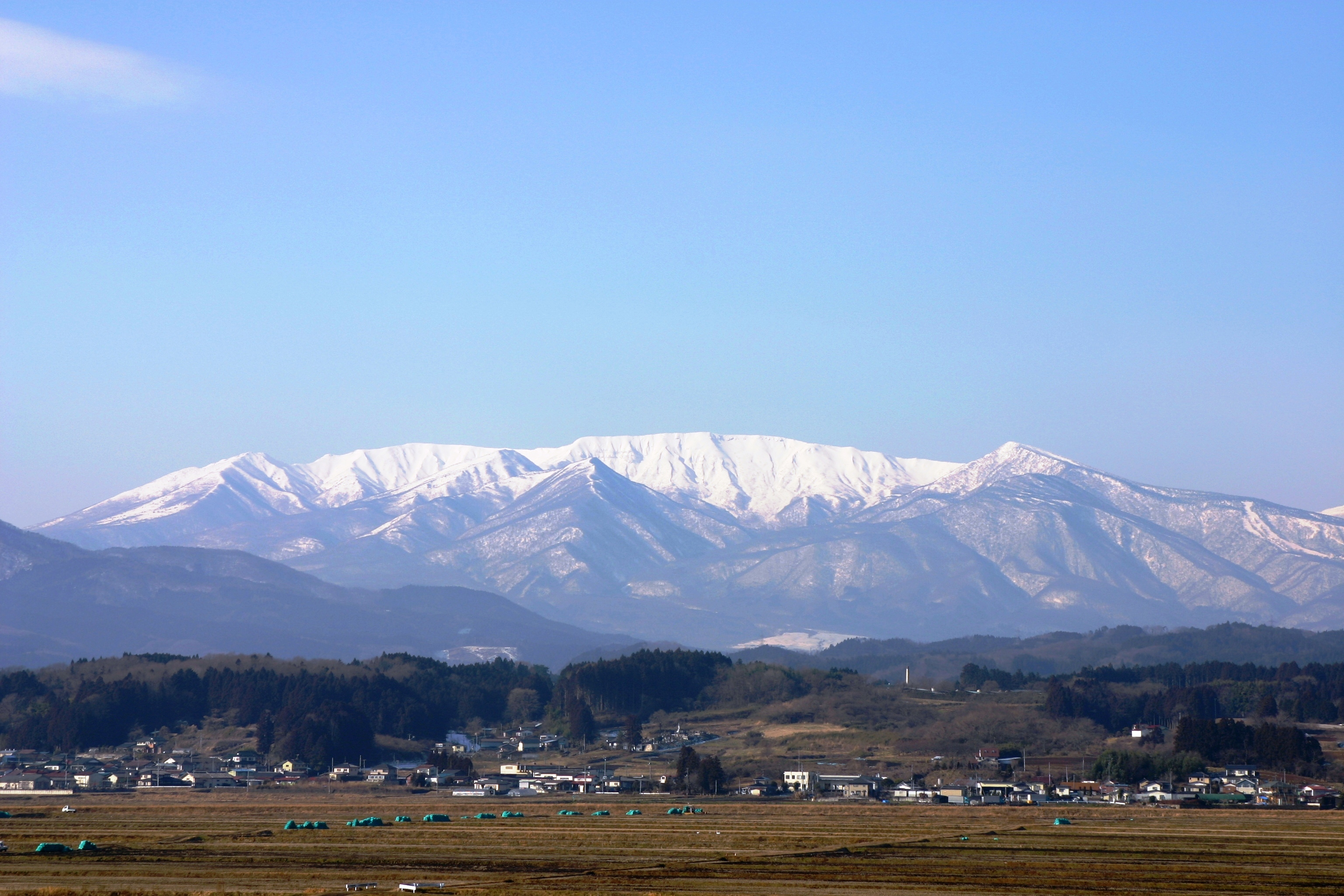
- Zaō mountain range from Miyagi Prefecture

- Location within Miyagi Prefecture Location within Japan
- Location: Miyagi Prefecture, Japan
- Coordinates: 38°04′55″N 140°32′55″E
- Area: 206.06 km^{2} (79.56 sq mi)
- Established: 21 February 1947

Zaō Kōgen Prefectural Natural Park (蔵王高原県立自然公園, Zaō Kōgen kenritsu shizen kōen) is a Prefectural Natural Park in southwest Miyagi Prefecture, Japan. First designated for protection in 1947, the park spans the municipalities of Kawasaki, Shichikashuku, Shiroishi, and Zaō. The park centres upon the plateau of Mount Zaō and contains a number of onsen.

== See also ==
- National Parks of Japan
- Zaō Quasi-National Park
