= List of places of scenic beauty of Japan (Miyagi) =

This list is of the places of scenic beauty of Japan located within the Prefecture of Miyagi.

== National Places of Scenic Beauty ==
As of 1 January 2021, seven Places have been designated at a national level (including one *Special Place of Scenic Beauty); Landscape of Oku no Hosomichi is a serial designation spanning ten prefectures.

Site	Municipality	Comments	Image	Coordinates	Type	Ref.
*Matsushima 松島; Matsushima	Higashimatsushima, Matsushima, Rifu, Shichigahama, Shiogama			38°20′00″N 141°05′58″E	11, 8	
Former Yūbikan and Gardens 旧有備館および庭園; Kyū-Yūbikan oyobi teien	Ōsaki	also a Historic Site		38°39′27″N 140°51′48″E	1	
Akiu Great Falls 秋保大滝; Akiu ōtaki	Sendai			38°16′30″N 140°36′08″E	6	
Banji 磐司; Banji	Sendai			38°16′26″N 140°30′53″E	6	
Saitō Family Gardens 齋藤氏庭園; Saitō-shi teien	Ishinomaki			38°30′24″N 141°11′36″E	1	
Enunkan Gardens 煙雲館庭園; Enunkan teien	Kesennuma			38°54′29″N 141°34′12″E	1	
Landscape of Oku no Hosomichi おくのほそ道の風景地; Oku no Hosomichi no fūkei-chi	Iwanuma, Sendai, Shiogama, Tagajō	designation spans ten prefectures, including seven component properties in Miyagi: Takekuma no matsu (武隈の松), Tsubo no Ishibumi (壺碑), Oki no I (興井), Sue no Matsuyama (末の末山), Magakigashima (籬が島), Tsutsujigaoka and Tenjin Shrine (つゝじが岡及び天神の御社), and Kinoshita and Yakushi-dō (木の下及び薬師堂)		38°15′02″N 140°54′02″E		

== Prefectural Places of Scenic Beauty ==
As of 1 May 2020, two Places have been designated at a prefectural level.

Site	Municipality	Comments	Image	Coordinates	Type	Ref.
Ōgama Hanzō 巨釜半造; Ōgama hanzō	Kesennuma			38°53′34″N 141°40′01″E		
Naruko-kyō 鳴子峡; Naruko-kyō	Ōsaki			38°44′06″N 140°41′25″E		

== Municipal Places of Scenic Beauty ==
As of 1 May 2020, twelve Places have been designated at a municipal level.

== See also ==
- Cultural Properties of Japan
- List of Historic Sites of Japan (Miyagi)
- List of parks and gardens of Miyagi Prefecture
