= Akiu, Miyagi =

Dissolved municipality in Miyagi prefecture, Japan

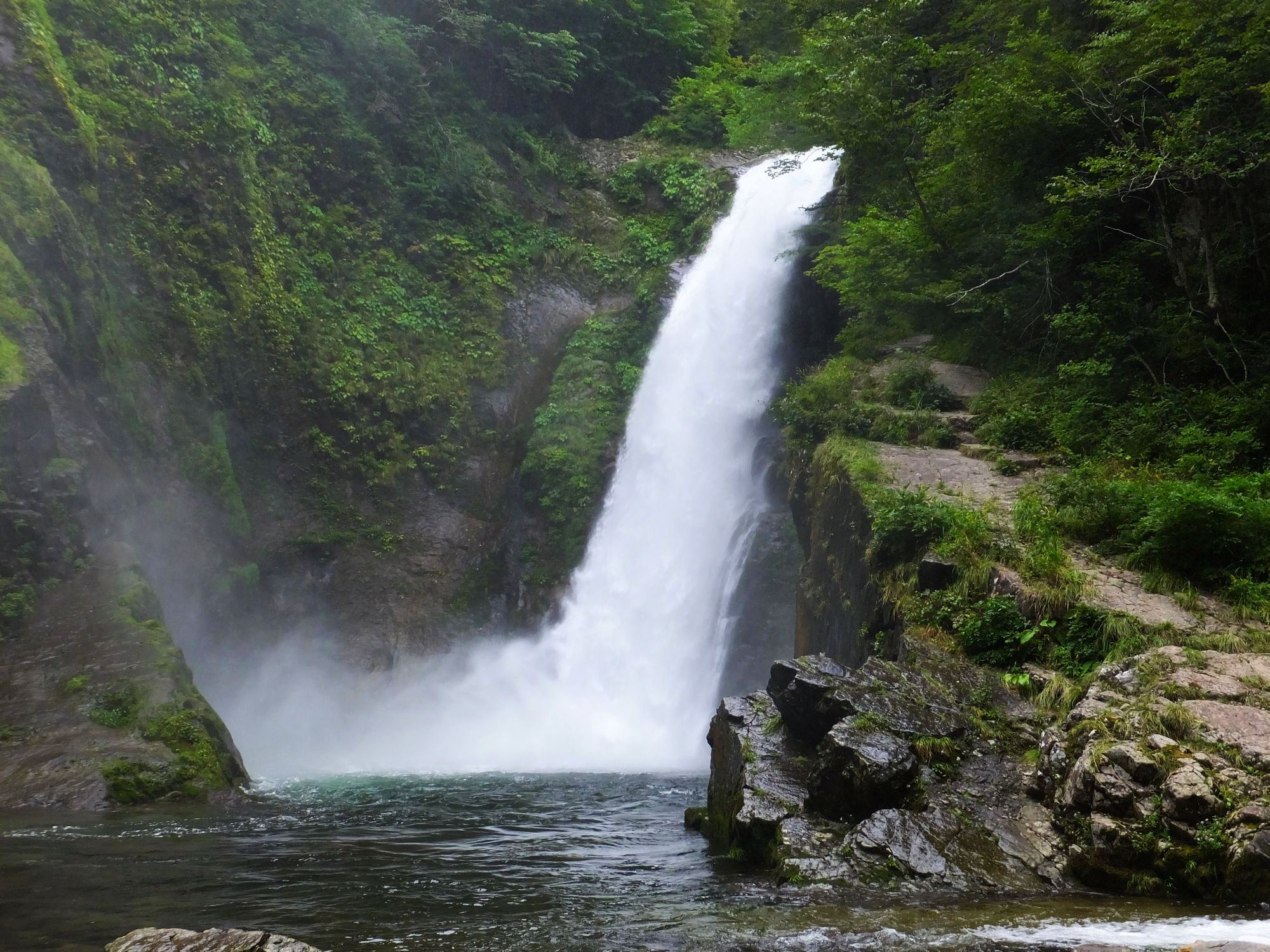
Akiu Great Falls

Akiu (秋保町, Akiu-chō) was a town located in Natori District, Miyagi Prefecture from 1967 to 1988. It is now the western part of Taihaku-ku, Sendai.

== Geography ==
Most of the town limits are forest, and it is the drainage basin of Natori River. The town has many tourist attractions, such as Akiu Great Falls, Rairaikyo, Akiu Hot Springs and Futakuchi Hot Springs.

- Mountain Peaks - Mount Kamuro (1,356m), Mount Ōkura (433m), Mount Taihaku (321m)
- Rivers - Natori River, Zaru River

=== Surrounding municipalities ===
- Miyagi Prefecture
  - Sendai
  - Kawasaki
- Yamagata Prefecture
  - Yamagata
  - Higashine

== History ==
- 1947 - The villages of Nikkawa (新川村), (馬場村), (長袋村), (境野村) and (湯元村) merged to become the village of Akiu.
- 1955 - Former village of Nikkawa area was moved to the village of Miyagi.
- 1967 - Becomes the town of Akiu.
- 1988 - Absorbed by the city of Sendai on March 1.

== Transportation ==
=== Railroads ===
- Akiu Electronic Railway Akiu Line (cancelled in 1961)

Rairaikyō - Akiu Hot Springs

=== Road ===
==== National Highways ====
- Route 457

== Tourist Attractions ==
- Akiu Great Falls
- Akiu Hot Springs
- Futakuchi Hot Springs
- Rairaikyō

== Food ==
Akiu is known locally for its tofu, which comes packaged in a piece of bamboo.
