= Shichikashuku Dam =

Dam in Miyagi Prefecture, Japan

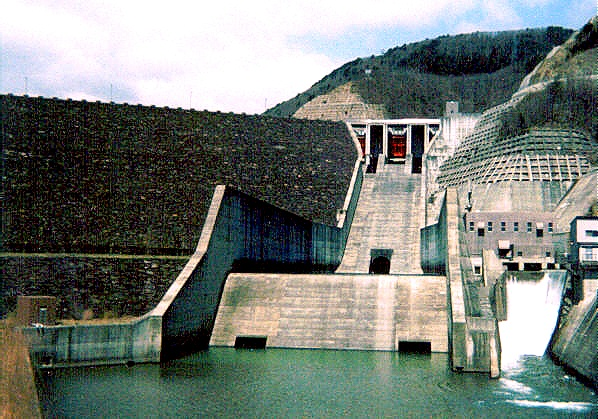

- Location within Miyagi Prefecture Location within Japan
- Location: Shichikashuku, Miyagi, Japan
- Coordinates: 37°57′37″N 140°30′44″E
- Construction began: 1973
- Opening date: 1991
- Owners: Ministry of Land, Infrastructure, Transport and Tourism

Dam and spillways
- Type of dam: Rock-fill dam
- Impounds: Shiroishi River
- Height: 90 m (300 ft)
- Length: 565 m (1,854 ft)

Reservoir
- Total capacity: 109,000,000 m^{3}
- Catchment area: 263.6 km^{2}
- Surface area: 410 hectares (1,000 acres)

Power Station
- Annual generation: 3600 kW

Shichikashuku Dam (Japanese: 七ヶ宿ダム) is a rock-fill dam in the town of Shichikashuku, Miyagi, Japan, completed in 1991. The dam crosses the Shiroishi River, a branch of the Abukuma River system.
