= Kamafusa Dam =

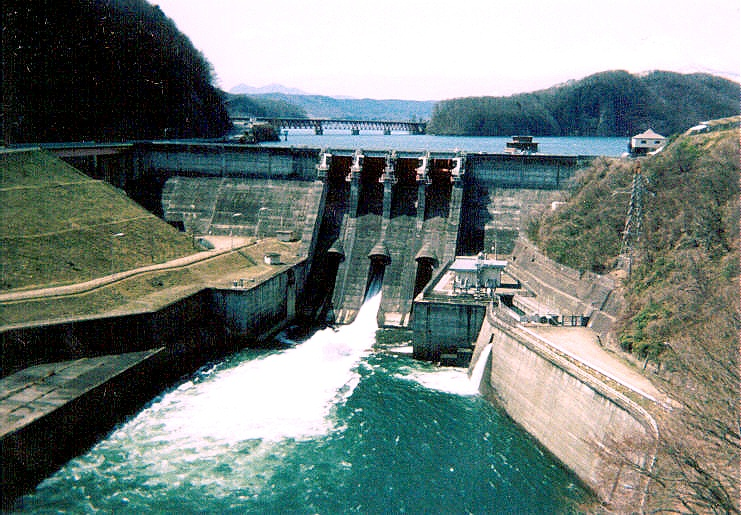

- Location within Miyagi Prefecture Location within Japan
- Location: Kawasaki, Miyagi, Japan
- Coordinates: 38°12′08″N 140°41′51″E
- Construction began: 1964
- Opening date: 1970
- Owner: Ministry of Land, Infrastructure, Transport and Tourism

Dam and spillways
- Type of dam: Gravity dam
- Height: 45.5 m (149 ft)
- Length: 177 m (581 ft)
- Dam volume: 100,000 m^{3}

Reservoir
- Creates: Lake Kamafusa Lake
- Total capacity: 45,300,000 m^{3}
- Catchment area: 195.3 km^{2}
- Surface area: 390 hectares (960 acres)

Power Station
- Annual generation: 1200 KW

Kamafusa Dam (釜房ダム, Kamafusa damu) is a multi-purpose concrete gravity dam in Kawasaki, Miyagi Prefecture, Japan, completed in 1970.

The number of residents living in the target area was 181 households and 1,103 people, which was more than that of Okura Dam. As a result, residents strongly opposed the construction of the dam, and compensation negotiations with the Ministry of Construction were forced to take a long time. After repeated negotiations, it took three years since the implementation plan survey was started, the general compensation standard was concluded, and a signing was made with the representatives of the residents. Residents left their hometown after this, but of the 181 households, 25% relocated to their hometown of Kawasaki, 52% to Sendai, and 23% to other cities, towns and villages outside the prefecture or within the prefecture.

== See also ==
- Natori River
