= Shichikashuku, Miyagi =

Shichikashuku 七ヶ宿町
- Town
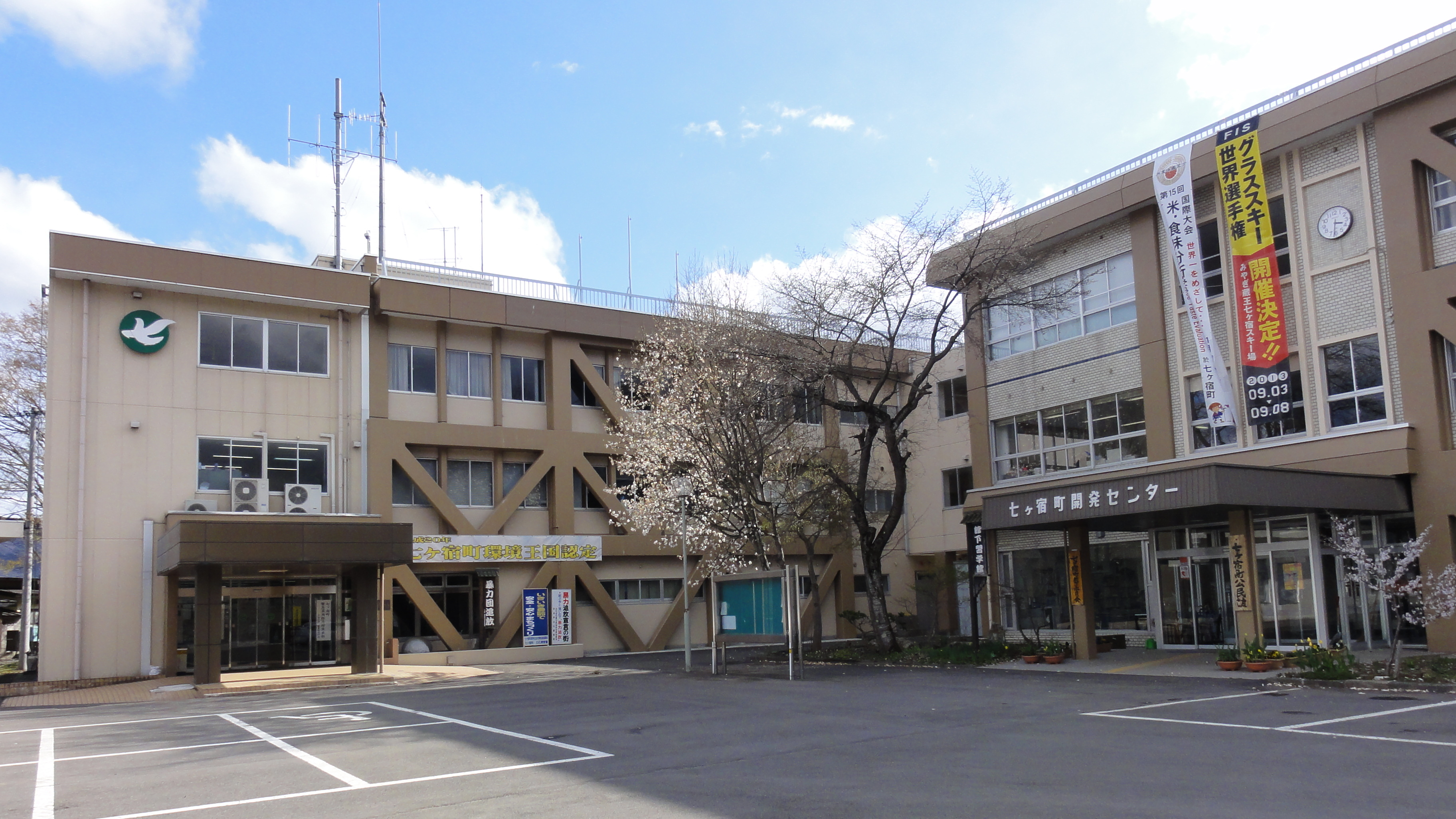
- Shichikashuku Town hall

- Flag Seal

- Location of Shichikashuku in Miyagi Prefecture

- Coordinates: 37°59′34.7″N 140°26′29.7″E
- Country: Japan
- Region: Tōhoku
- Prefecture: Miyagi
- District: Katta

Area
  - Total: 263.09 km^{2} (101.58 sq mi)

Population (June 1, 2020)
  - Total: 1,323
  - Density: 5.029/km^{2} (13.02/sq mi)
- Time zone: UTC+9 (Japan Standard Time)
- Tree: Magnolia kobus
- Flower: Lilium rubellum
- Bird: Oriental turtle dove
- Phone number: 0224-37-2111
- Address: Seki 126 banchi, Shichikashuku-machi, Katta-gun, Miyagi-ken 989-0512
- Website: Official website

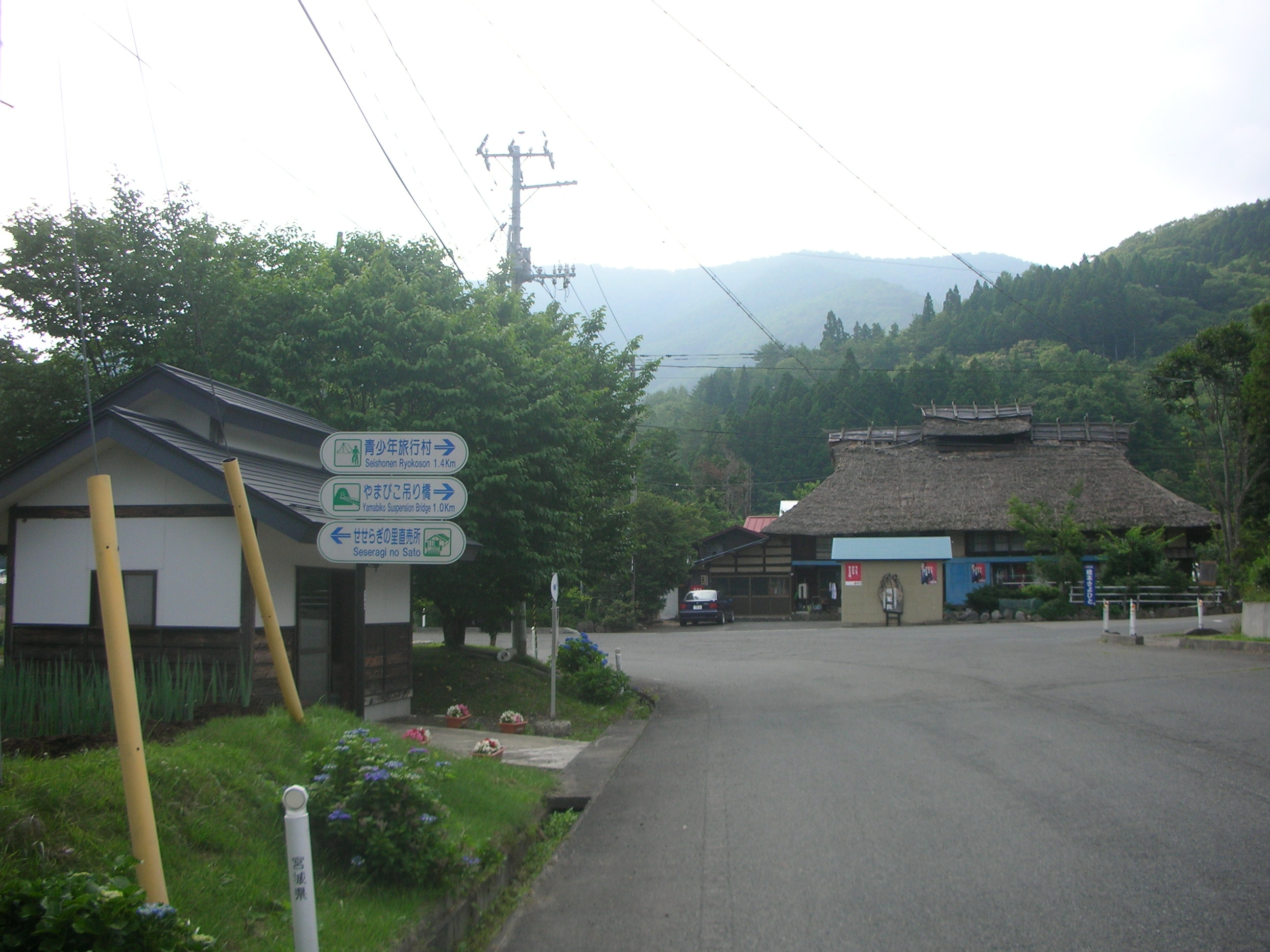
Traditional houses in Shichikashuku

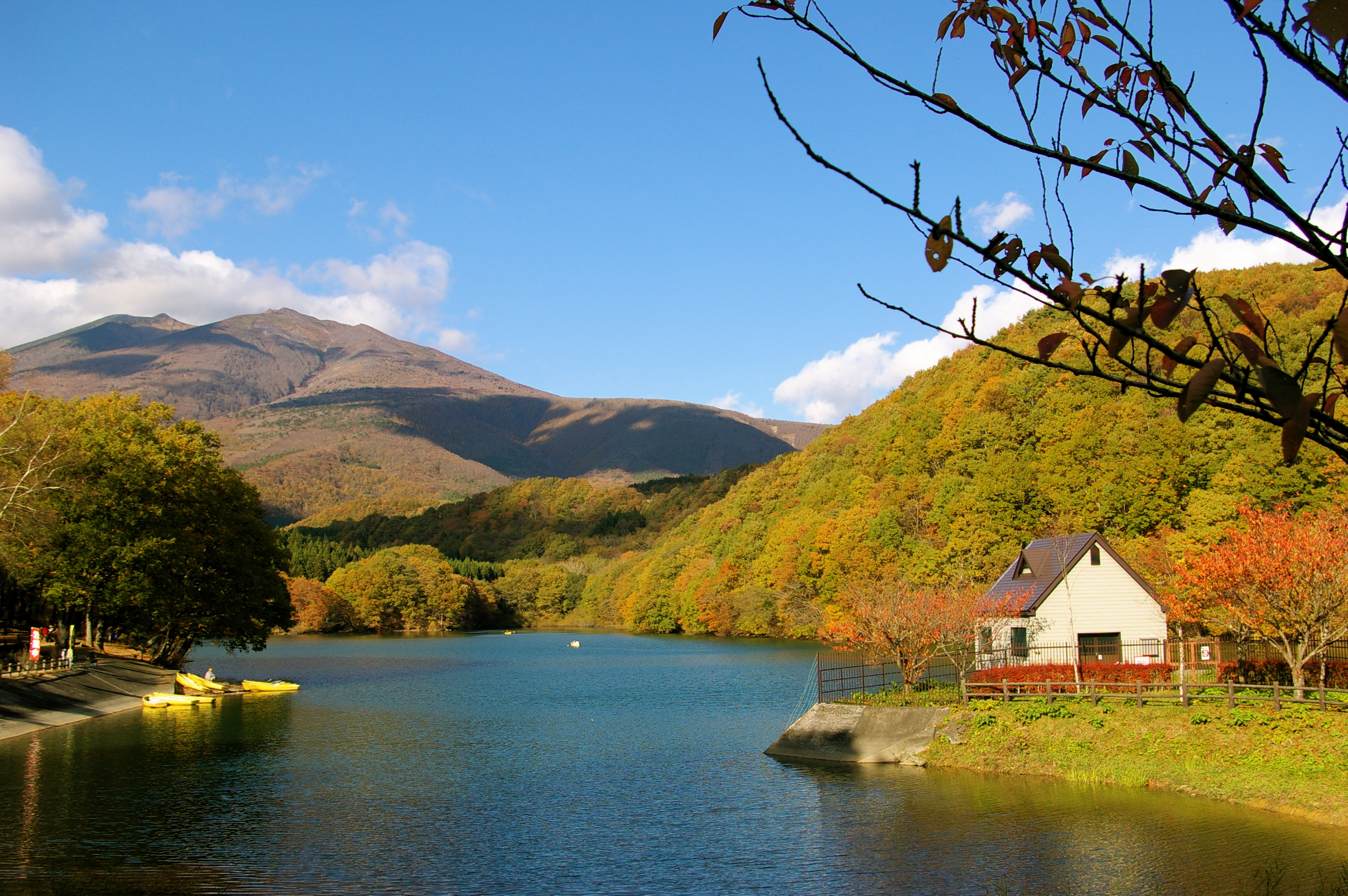
Lake Chōrō in Shichikashuku

Shichikashuku (七ヶ宿町, Shichikashuku-machi) is a town located in Katta District, Miyagi Prefecture, Japan. As of 1 June 2020, the town had an estimated population of 1,323, and a population density of 5.0 persons per km^{2} in 626 households. The total area of the town is 263.09 square kilometres (101.58 sq mi).

== Geography ==
Shichikashuku is located in the Tōhoku region of northern Japan in the far southwestern corner of Miyagi Prefecture. Surrounded by the Zaō Mountains, it is bordered by Yamagata Prefecture to the north and west, and by Fukushima Prefecture to the south. Parts of the town are within the borders of the Zaō Quasi-National Park or the Zaō Kōgen Prefectural Natural Park.

=== Neighboring municipalities ===
Fukushima Prefecture

- Fukushima

Miyagi Prefecture

- Shiroishi
- Zaō

Yamagata Prefecture

- Kaminoyama
- Takahata

=== Climate ===
Shichikashuku has a humid subtropical climate (Köppen climate classification Cfa) characterized by mild summers and cold winters. The average annual temperature in Shichikashuku is 9.6 °C. The average annual rainfall is 1430 mm with September as the wettest month. The temperatures are highest on average in August, at around 23.1 °C, and lowest in January, at around -2.7 °C.

== Demographics ==
Per Japanese census data, the population of Shichikashuku has declined steadily over the past 70 years and is now much smaller than it was a century ago.

Historical population
| Year | Pop. | ±% |
|---|---|---|
| 1920 | 4,490 | — |
| 1930 | 4,758 | +6.0% |
| 1940 | 4,936 | +3.7% |
| 1950 | 5,536 | +12.2% |
| 1960 | 5,177 | −6.5% |
| 1970 | 3,712 | −28.3% |
| 1980 | 2,926 | −21.2% |
| 1990 | 2,208 | −24.5% |
| 2000 | 2,034 | −7.9% |
| 2010 | 1,694 | −16.7% |
| 2020 | 1,262 | −25.5% |

== History ==
The area of present-day Shichikashuku was part of ancient Mutsu Province, and was part of the holdings of Sendai Domain under the Edo period Tokugawa shogunate. It was made part Katta District in the new Iwaki Province at the start of the Meiji period. The district was transferred to Miyagi Prefecture on 21 August 1876.

Shichikashuku Village was established on April 1, 1889, with the establishment of the post-Meiji restoration modern municipalities system. It was raised to town status on April 1, 1957.

== Government ==
Shichikashuku has a mayor-council form of government with a directly elected mayor and a unicameral town council of 8 members. Shichikashuku, collectively with the city of Shiroishi and the town of Zaō, contributes two seats to the Miyagi Prefectural legislature.. In terms of national politics, the town is part of Miyagi 3rd district of the lower house of the Diet of Japan.

== Economy ==
The economy of Shichikashuku is largely based on agriculture and forestry.

== Education ==
Shichikashuku has one public elementary school and one public middle school operated by the town government, and one public high school operated by the Miyagi Prefectural Board of Education. There is also one private high school.

== Transportation ==
Shichikashuku does not have by any passenger train service.

=== Highway ===
- National Route 113
- National Route 299

== Local attractions ==
- Shichikashuku Dam
- Zaō Kōgen Prefectural Natural Park
- Zaō Quasi-National Park
