= Mutsu Kokubun-ji =

Buddhist temple in Miyagi Prefecture, Japan

- 陸奥国分寺
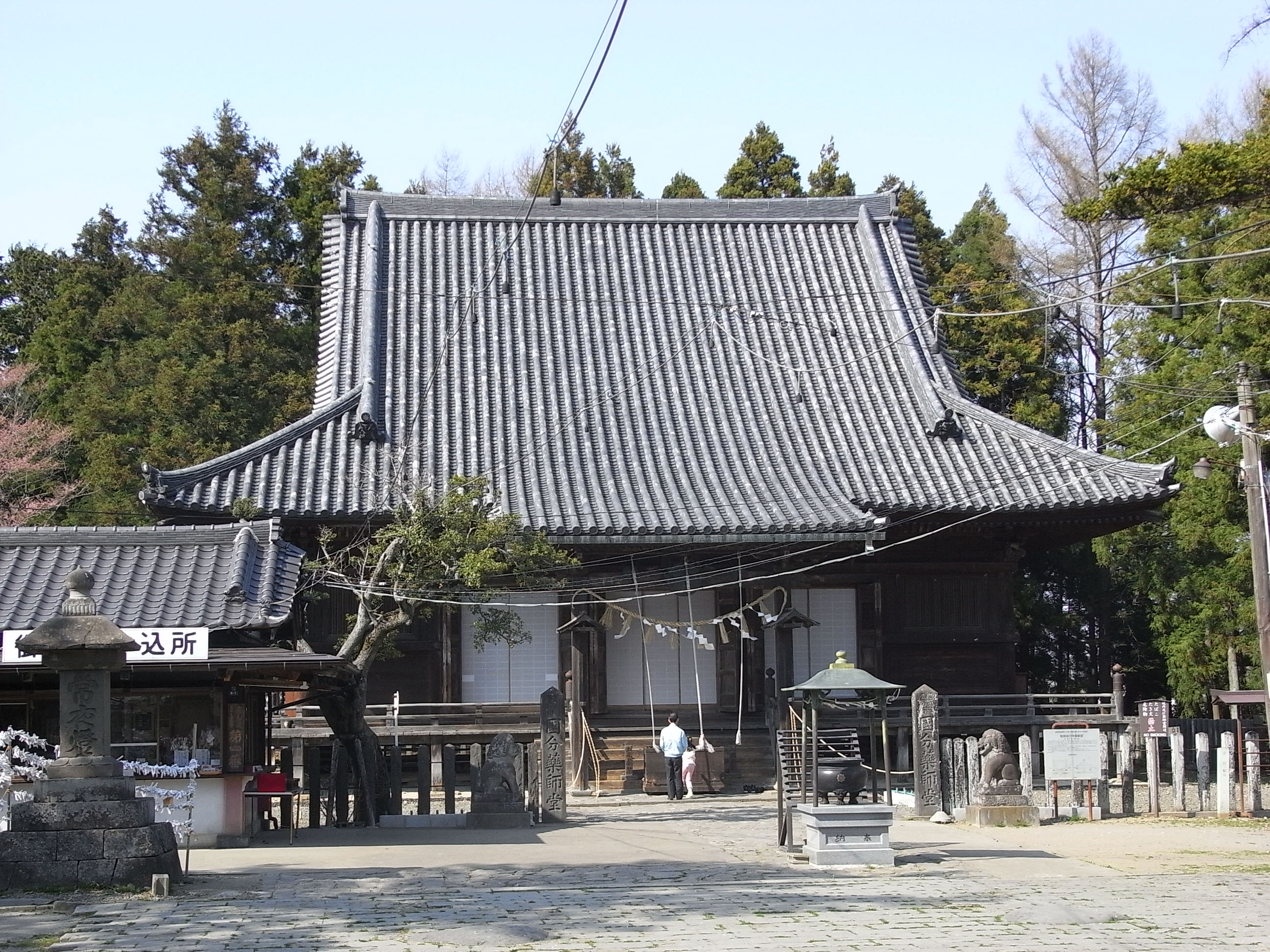
- Mutsu Kokubun-ji Yakushido

- Location within Miyagi Prefecture Location within Japan

Religion
- Affiliation: Buddhist
- Deity: Yakushi Nyōrai
- Rite: Shingon-shū Chizan-ha
- Status: active

Location
- Location: 2-8-28 Kinoshita, Wakabayashi-ku, Sendai-shi, Miyagi-ken
- Country: Japan
- Coordinates: 38°15′02″N 140°54′02″E

Architecture
- Founder: Emperor Shōmu
- Completed: 741

Website
- Official website (in Japanese)
- National Historic Site of Japan National Place of Scenic Beauty National Important Cultural Property

Mutsu Kokubun-ji (陸奥国分寺) is a Buddhist temple in Wakabayashi-ku, Sendai, Japan. It belongs to the Shingon-shū Chizan-ha sect, and its honzon is a hibutsu statue of Yakushi Nyōrai. It is the successor of the provincial temple (kokubunji) of former Mutsu Province. The grounds of the temple are a National Historic Site and one of its structures, the early Edo period Yakushi-dō (薬師堂), is an Important Cultural Property.

== Ancient Mutsu Kokubun-ji ==
The Shoku Nihongi records that in 741, as the country recovered from a major smallpox epidemic, Emperor Shōmu ordered that a monastery and nunnery be established in every province, for the purpose of promoting Buddhism as the national religion of Japan and standardising control of imperial rule over the provinces.

In the late Nara period, after the establishment of a centralized government under the Ritsuryō system, the imperial court sent a number of military expeditions to what is now the Tōhoku region of northern Japan to bring the local Emishi tribes under its control. After the establishment of Taga Castle, Yamato forces gradually pushed into the hinterland of what is now Miyagi Prefecture, establishing several fortified settlements along with several large-scale Buddhist temples. The Mutsu Kokubun-ji was located 9.5 kilometers from Taga Castle. The original design of the temple was a walled square area, 240 meters on a side, containing a large South Gate, Middle Gate, Kondō, Lecture Hall, Cloisters, Rectory and a seven-story Pagoda, Kyōzō, Shōrō, Kuri, and dormitory. Excavations have revealed that this was one of the largest of the provincial temples.

The temple was re-built in the Heian period after the 869 Sanriku earthquake; however, the pagoda was against destroyed in 934 AD, by lightning. Per the Engishiki records of 927 AD, the temple was assigned revenues of 40,000 koku of rice for its upkeep. The temple was again destroyed in 1189, during the campaign of Minamoto no Yoritomo against the Northern Fujiwara. Its subsequent history in the Kamakura period and Muromachi period is somewhat uncertain, although a smaller temple continued to exist on the site. At some point during this period, it converted to the Shingon sect.

Following the establishment of Sendai Domain under the Tokugawa shogunate, Masamune Date rebuilt the complex from 1605 on a large scale, but not upon the original foundations. At one point, it was surrounded by 25 subsidiary chapels. However, following the Meiji restoration, most of the temple was destroyed by the government's anti-Buddhism movement, leaving only one chapel, which is now the present-day Yakushi-dō.

The grounds of the temple were extensively excavated from 1955 to 1959. The excavations revealed that the temple was built from the 740s to 750s, and was located just south of the ruins of a settlement now called the Minami Koizumi ruins. The buildings were all built on foundation stones with tiled roofs and cobblestone floors, with buildings which supported the daily life of the monks having stilt pillars and raised floors. The temple was surrounded by moats and wooden palisades in the manner of a fortress, and was most probably not a place for ordinary people to enter and worship. However, immediately outside the temple enclosure were numerous pit dwellings, presumably for ordinary people who had some connection with the temple. Within the temple enclosure, fragments of melted copper decorations confirmed the records of the destruction of the temple's pagoda in 934 by lightning. It was also found that the Edo Period Niō-mon gate was built on the foundation of the Nara-period South Gate, and that the Yakushi-dō was built on the foundations of the Nara-period Lecture Hall, indicating that although the temple had fallen almost into complete ruin by the early Edo Period, its location and layout were still known at that time.

In the modern period, the ruins were neglected for many decades, with roof tiles being unearthed and taken away by amateur archaeologists and collectors. the site received protection as a National Historic Site in 1922. In 1932, a local historian surveyed the exposed foundation stones and estimated that they were in the correct positions for a Nara period temple. The area was designed a scenic area by the Ministry of Home Affairs in 1934. From 1955 to 1959, the site was excavated by Tōhoku University, and the foundations of all of the main buildings, and numerous previously unknown buildings were uncovered.

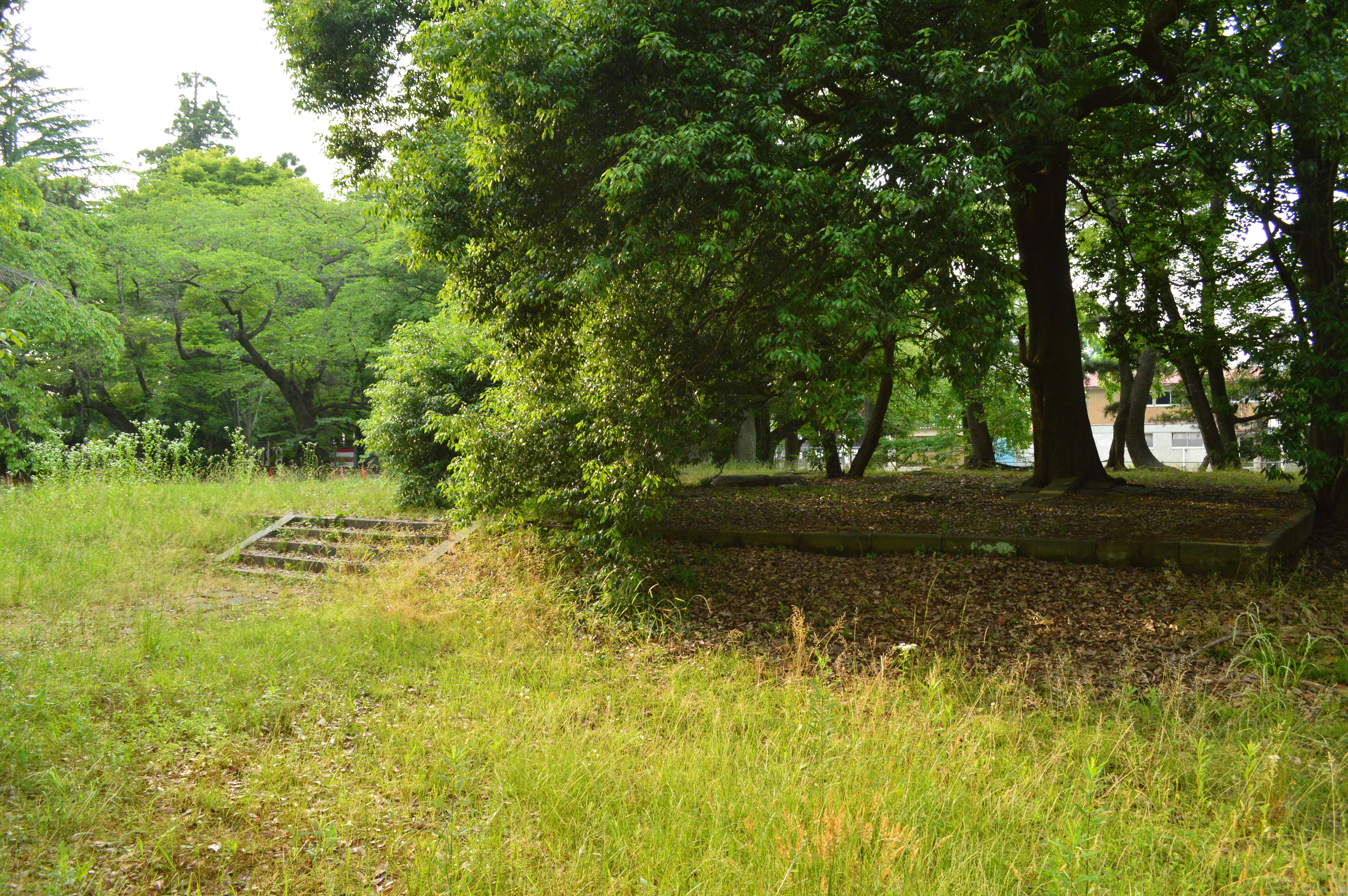
Foundations of the Pagoda

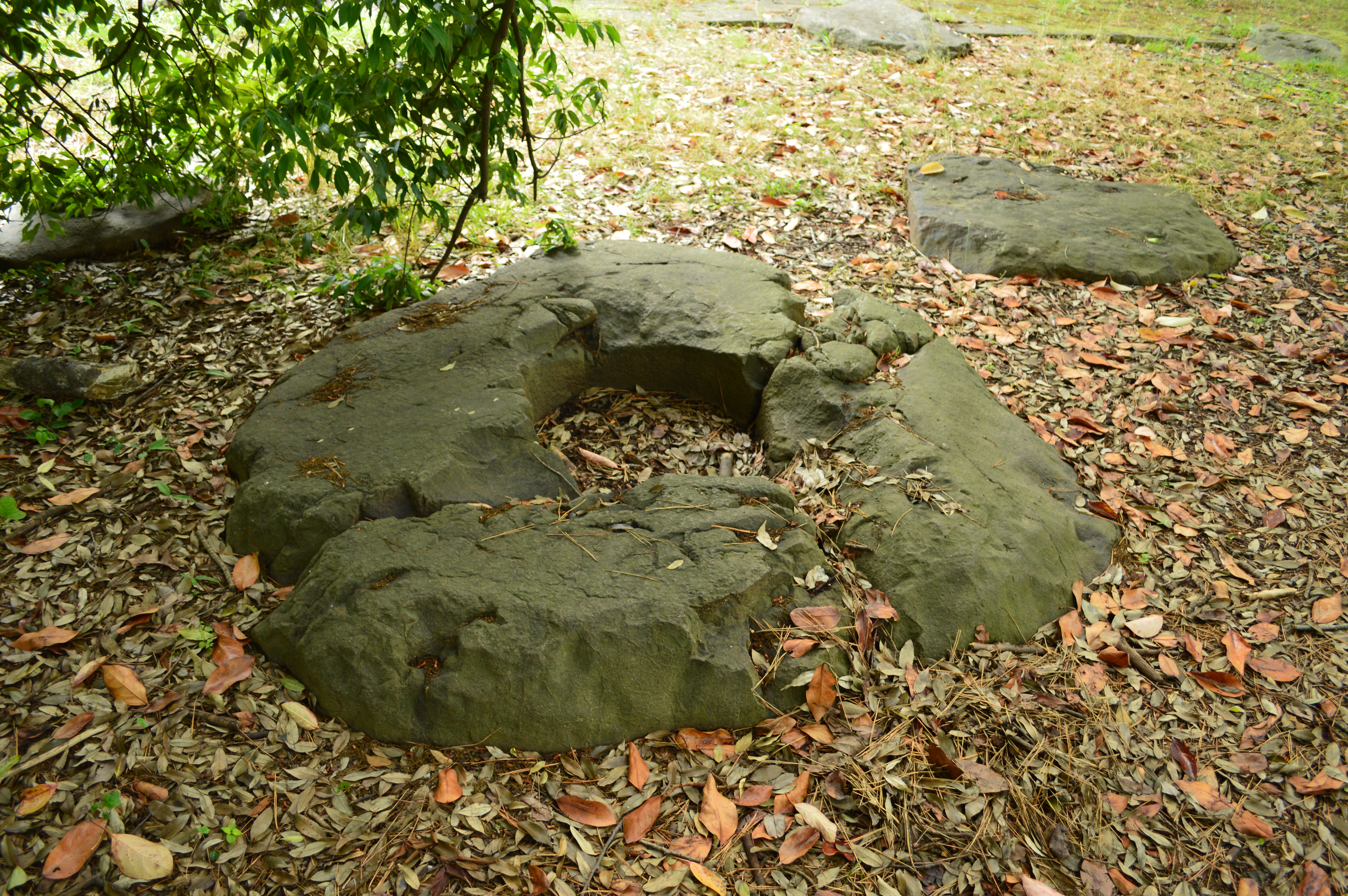
Foundations of the Pagoda

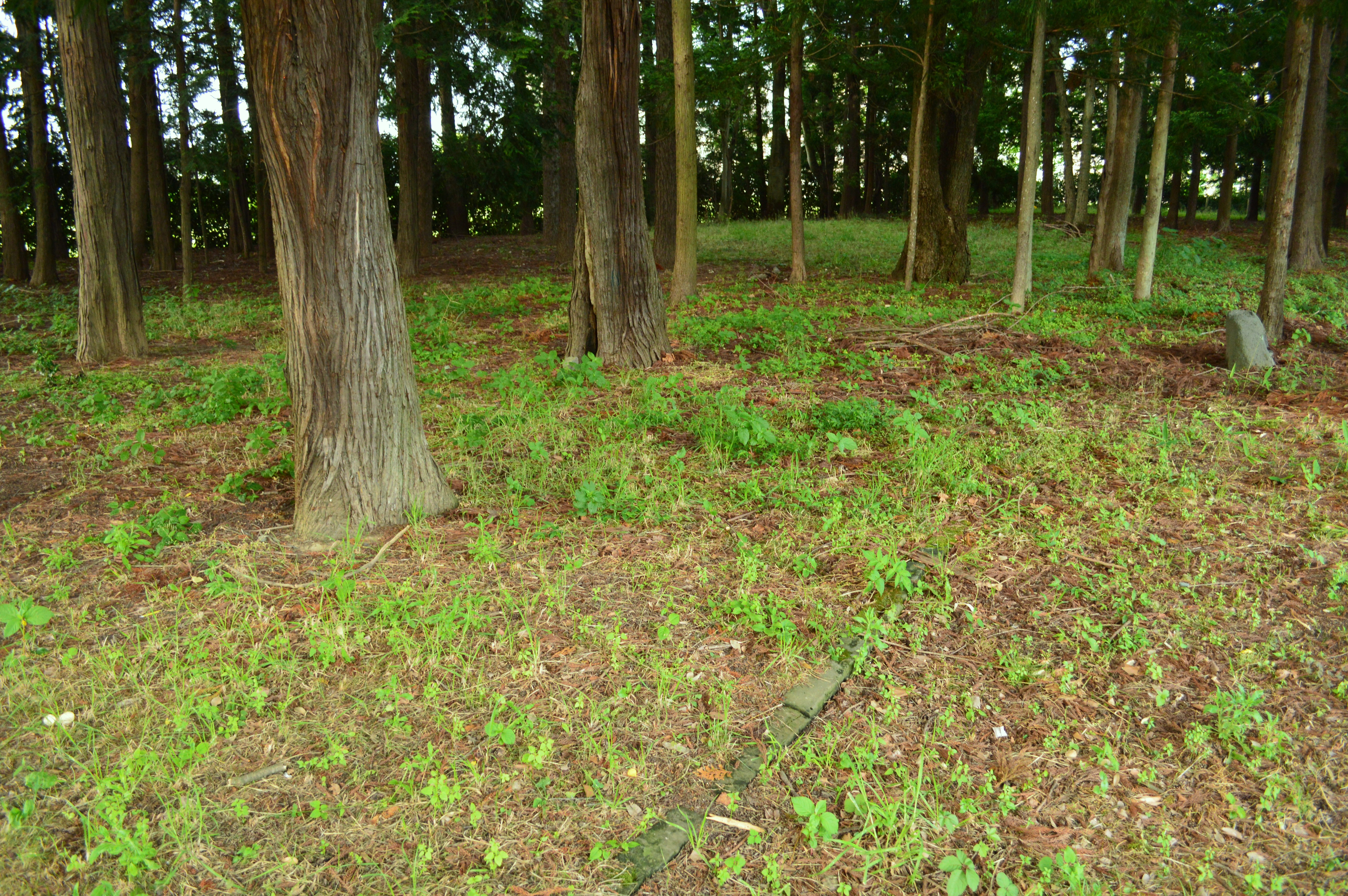
Foundations of the Rectory

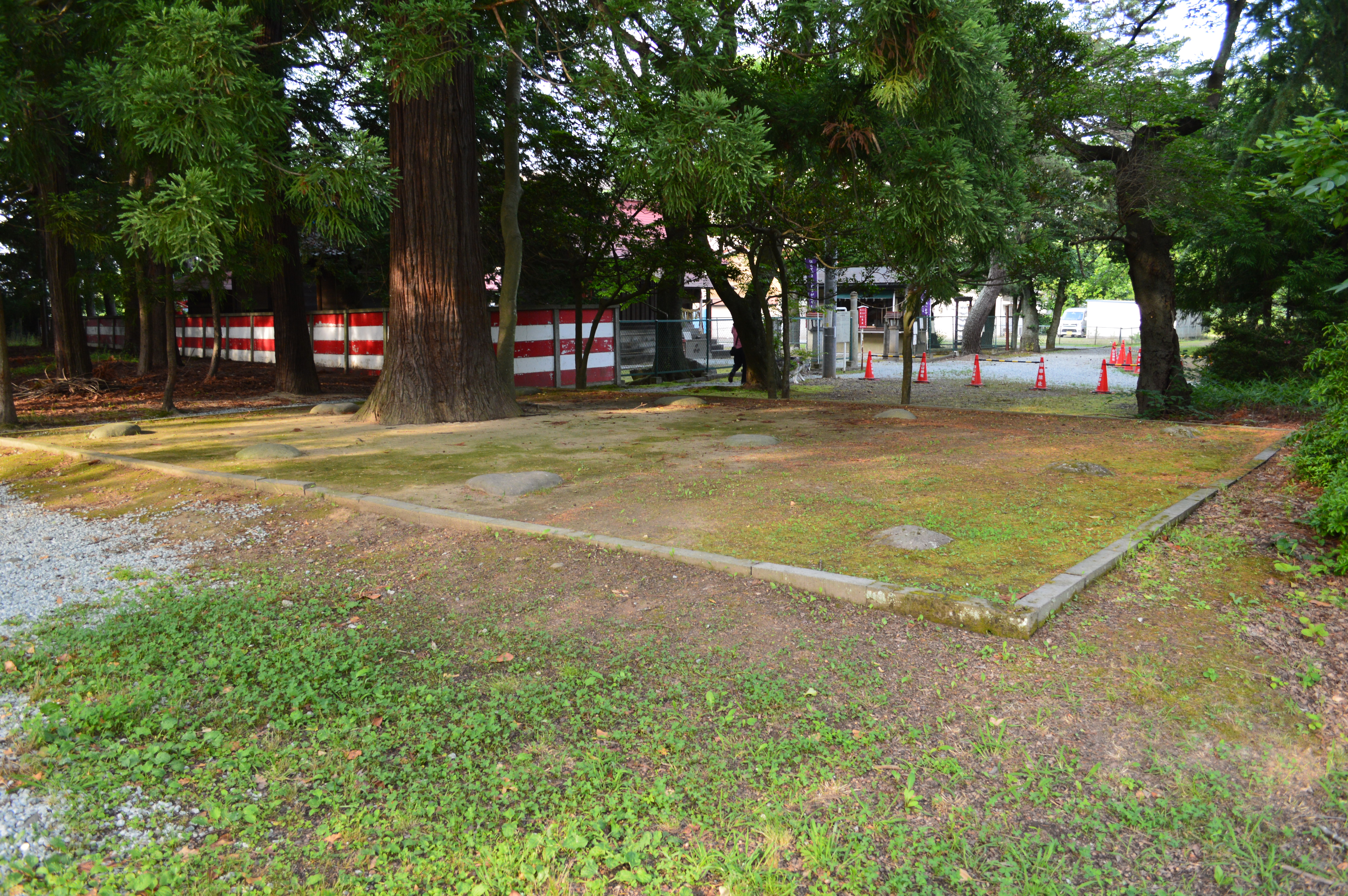
Foundations of the Belfry

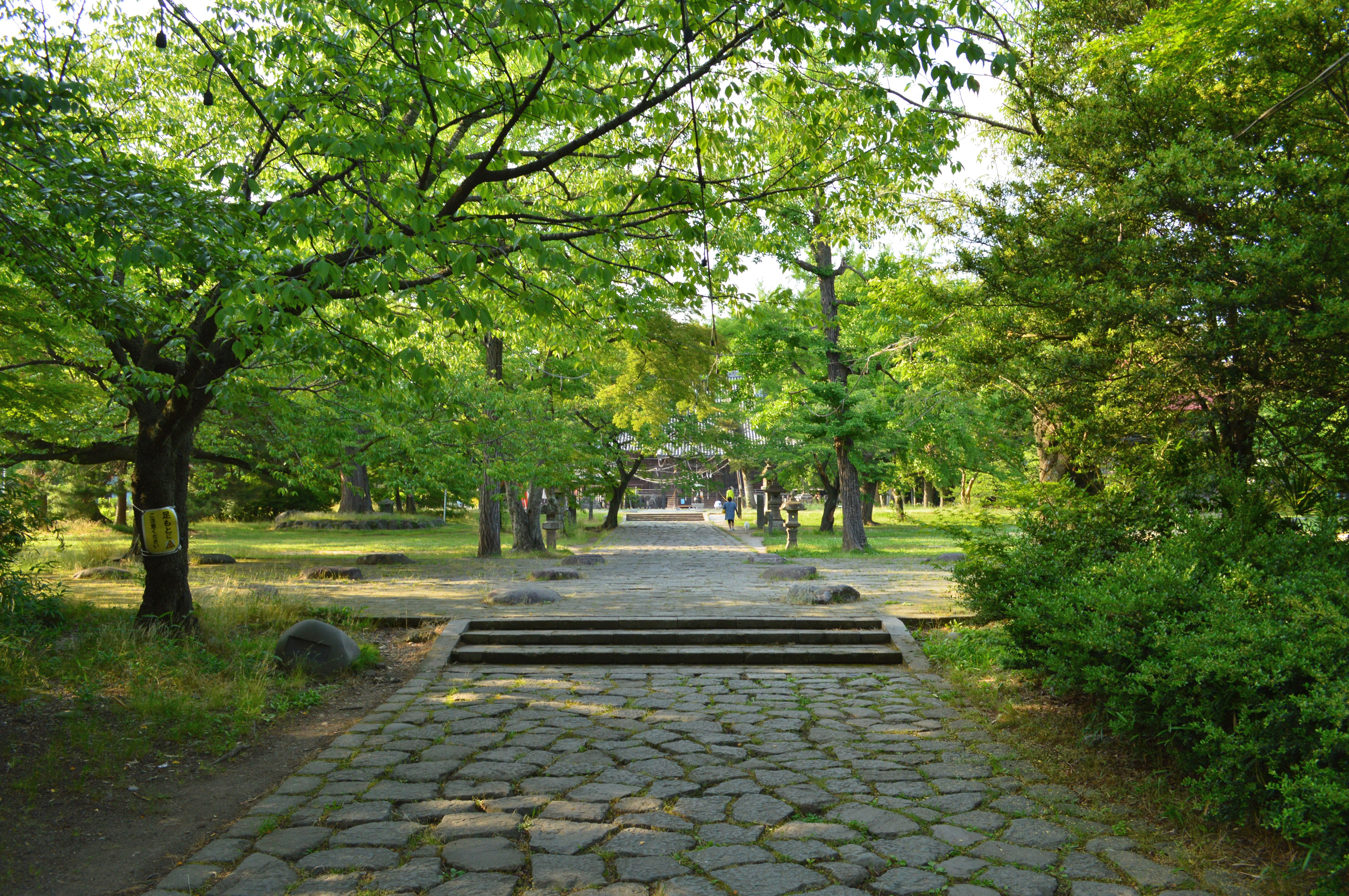
Foundations of the Middle Gate

== Mutsu Kokubun-ji Yakushi-dō ==
Date Masamune, who built Sendai Castle in 1601, continued various civil works in his territory, of which reconstruction of the Mutsu Kokubun-ji was part of his policy of reconstructing famous temples in his territory, such as the reconstruction of Chuson-ji and Zuigan-ji The reconstruction work took three years from 1605 to 1607, and the new main hall of the reconstructed temple became the Yakushi-dō, which was completed in 1607. In 1903 this structure was designated an Important Cultural Property.

The building houses the temple's honzon, a bronze statue of Yakushi Nyōrai. The statue is a hibutsu image, and is only display only once a year. It is flanked by wooden Nikkō Bosatsu and Gakkō Bosatsu. An inscription within the Gakkō Bosatsu dates it to 1645; however, temple legend states that the statue of Yakushi Nyōrai is a surviving image from the original Nara-period temple. The chapel also contains Kamakura period standing statues of Fudō Myōō, Bishamon-ten and the Twelve Heavenly Generals, all of which are Miyagi Prefectural Tangible Cultural Properties.

The building itself is x 5 x 5 bay hall, with an irimoya-zukuri roof. The building is in the architecture of the Momoyama era, but the exterior is uncolored wood, which is very plain compared to other temples and shrines built by Date Masamune around this time. The interior is divided into two, with the altar having columns painted with gold leaf, sculptured, decorated, and painted in vivid colors in great contrast to the outside of the building.

The Niōmon gate of the Yakushi-dō was also completed in 1607. It is a Miyagi Prefectural Tangible Cultural Property.

The Yakushi-do is also designated as a component of the Landscape of Oku no Hosomichi National Place of Scenic Beauty.

== See also ==
- Provincial temple
- Mutsu Kokubun-niji
- List of Historic Sites of Japan (Miyagi)
- List of Places of Scenic Beauty of Japan (Miyagi)
