= Saitō Garden (Ishinomaki) =

- Saitōshi-teien (齋藤氏庭園)
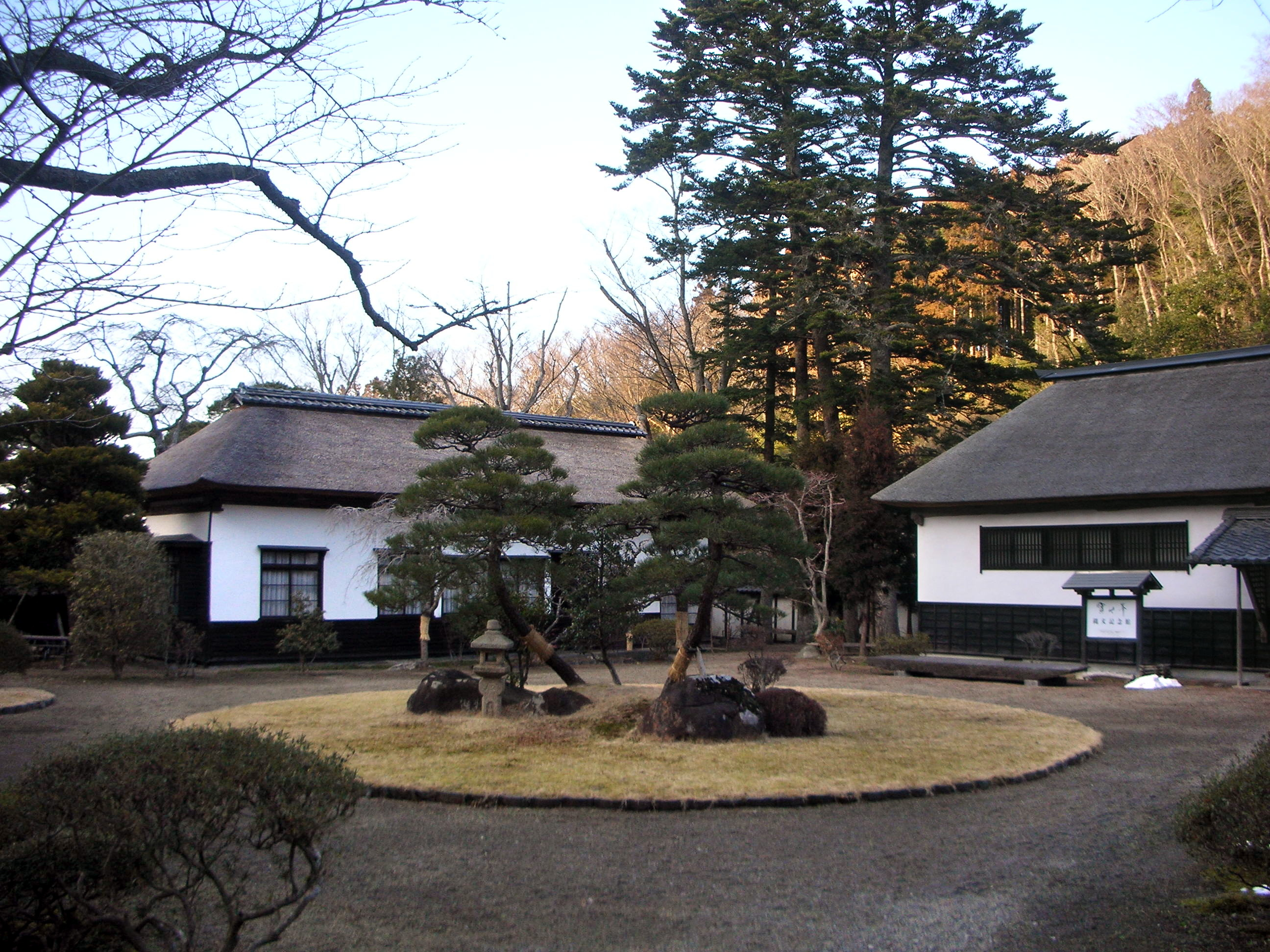
- Entry to Saitō Garden

- Location within Miyagi Prefecture Location within Japan
- Type: Japanese garden
- Location: Ishinomaki, Miyagi, Japan
- Coordinates: 38°30′24″N 141°11′35.76″E
- Created: Meiji period
- National Palace of Scenic Beauty

Saitō Garden (齋藤氏庭園, Saitōshi-teien) is a Japanese garden in the city of Ishinomaki, Miyagi Prefecture, in the Tōhoku region of northern Japan. It was established in the Meiji period by the ninth-generation head of the Saitō family, a prominent regional landlord. In 2005 Saitōshi-teien was designated a national Place of Scenic Beauty.

== Overview ==
The Saitō clan claimed descent from the Kasai clan, who were local daimyō until the clan was destroyed by Toyotomi Hideyoshi during his conquest of northern Japan. They returned to the land as farmers, amassing considerable territory, and changed their name to Saitō after seven generations. The clan prospered greatly under the Date clan of Sendai Domain by brewing sake, and as pawnbrokers, and rivaled the Honma clan of Tsuruoka Domain as the richest merchants in northern Japan in the Edo period. From the Meiji restoration until the post-World War II land reforms, they were the largest landowners in Miyagi Prefecture and were very influential politically.

The gardens were laid out by Saitō Zenemon, who was elected in the 1892 Japanese general election to the lower house of the Diet of Japan. Despite his great wealth, Saitō Zenemon was a noted philanthropist, contribution to the construction of schools and public libraries and for social issues. He built a simple villa at this location in 1911 on the site of his former sake brewery, retaining some pre-existing buildings and storehouses which had been constructed in the Keio period. The family continued to reside at this location until the 1940s.

== Layout of the garden ==
The garden uses the hillside behind for borrowing of scenery ("shakkei"). In one of the traditional-style houses inside the gardens there is a museum with Jōmon period artifacts.

The area has a hall in the center of it. The hall frames the slope of the hill and a garden and a pond around it. Cherry blossoms can be seen in spring, fresh greenery in early summer, leaves changing color in autumn, and snow in winter.

== See also ==
- Japanese garden
- List of Places of Scenic Beauty of Japan (Miyagi)
