= Akiu no Taue Odori =

Traditional rice-planting dance in Akiu, Miyagi

Akiu no taue odori (秋保の田植踊) is a traditional rice-planting dance in Akiu, now part of Sendai, Miyagi Prefecture, Japan. Performed since the seventeenth century, ten female dancers accompanied by two or four males enact a repertoire of six to ten dances to the sound of flute, drums and bells. In 1970 measures were taken to document the dance and in 1976 it was designated an Important Intangible Folk Cultural Property. In 2009 Akiu no taue odori was inscribed on the UNESCO Representative List of the Intangible Cultural Heritage of Humanity.

== See also ==
- Japanese traditional dance
- Traditional Japanese music
- List of Important Intangible Folk Cultural Properties
- Representative List of the Intangible Cultural Heritage of Humanity
- Matsuri
