= Sankai Falls =

Coordinates: 38°08′04.22″N 140°31′43.19″E

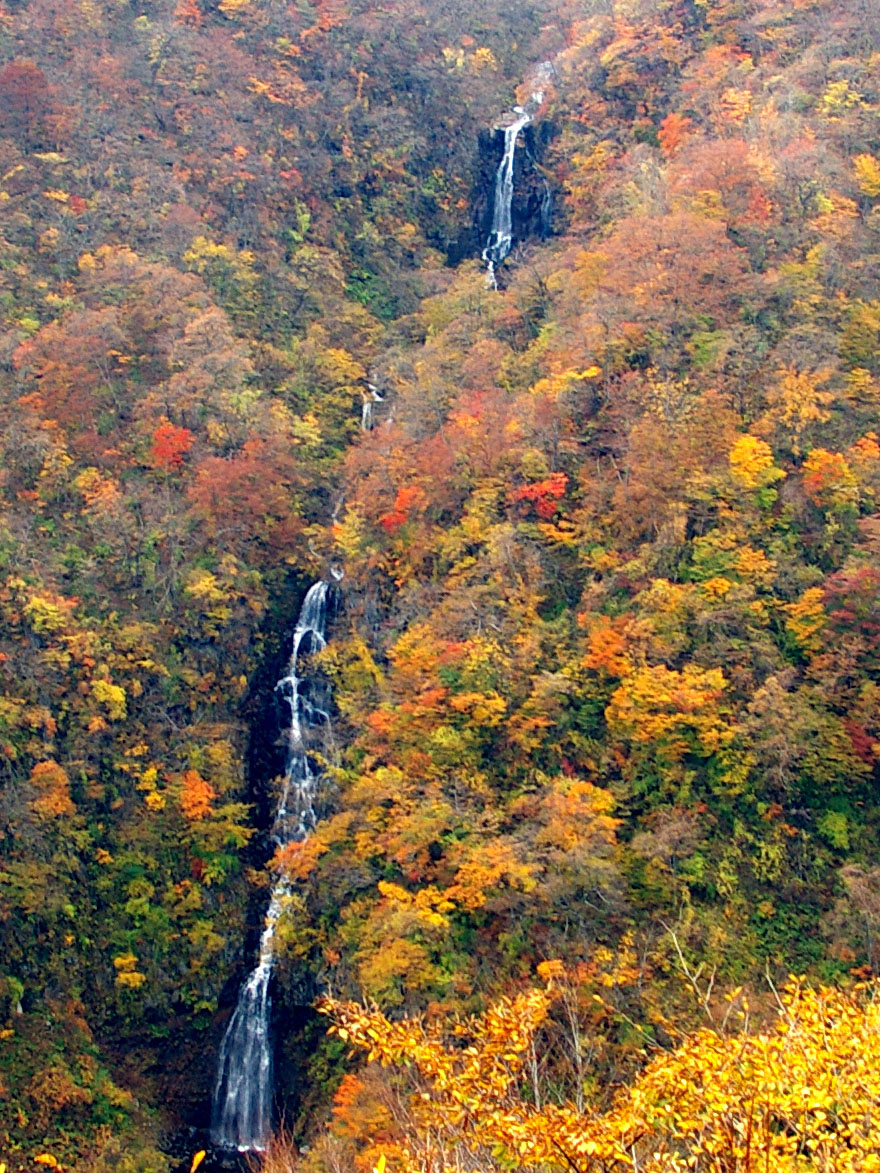

- Location within Miyagi Prefecture Location within Japan
- Location: Zaō, Miyagi Prefecture, Japan
- Type: Ribbon
- Total height: 181 m (594 ft)
- Number of drops: 1
- Average width: 7 m (23 ft)
- Watercourse: Sumikawa River

Sankai Falls (三階の滝, Sankai-no-taki) is a waterfall in Zaō, Katta District, Miyagi Prefecture, Japan, in on the Sumikawa River. It is one of "Japan’s Top 100 Waterfalls", in a listing published by the Japanese Ministry of the Environment in 1990.

== See also ==
- List of waterfalls
- List of waterfalls in Japan
