= Murata, Miyagi =

Murata 村田町
- Town
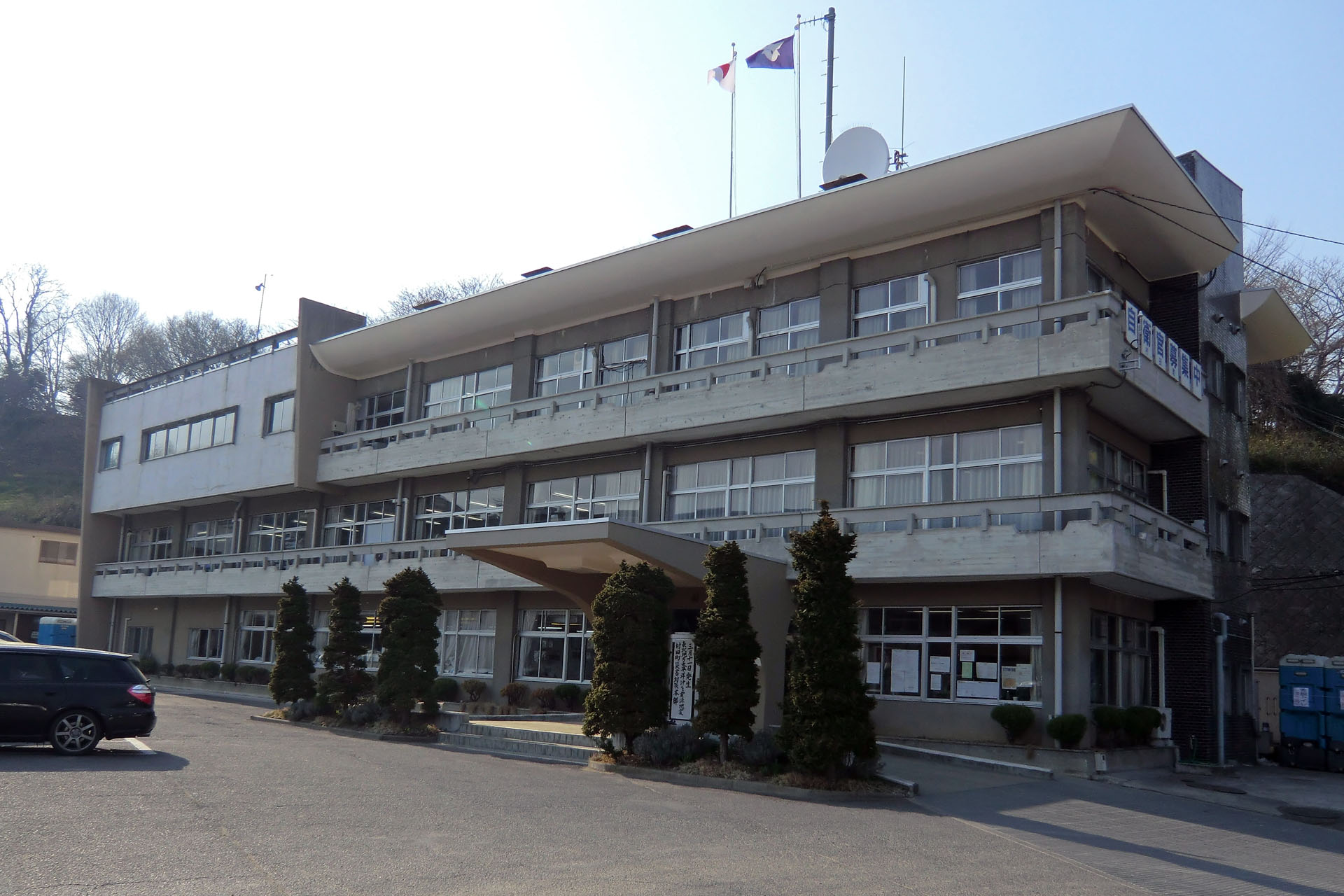
- Murata Town Office

- Flag Seal

- Location of Murata in Miyagi Prefecture

- Coordinates: 38°07′6.7″N 140°43′20.7″E
- Country: Japan
- Region: Tōhoku
- Prefecture: Miyagi
- District: Shibata

Area
  - Total: 78.38 km^{2} (30.26 sq mi)

Population (May 31, 2020)
  - Total: 10,675
  - Density: 136.2/km^{2} (352.7/sq mi)
- Time zone: UTC+9 (Japan Standard Time)
- City symbols
  - Tree: Pine
  - Flower: Osmanthus fragrans
  - Bird: Green pheasant
- Phone number: 0224-83-2111
- Address: Murata-machi, Shibata-gun, Miyagi-ken 989-1392
- Website: Official website

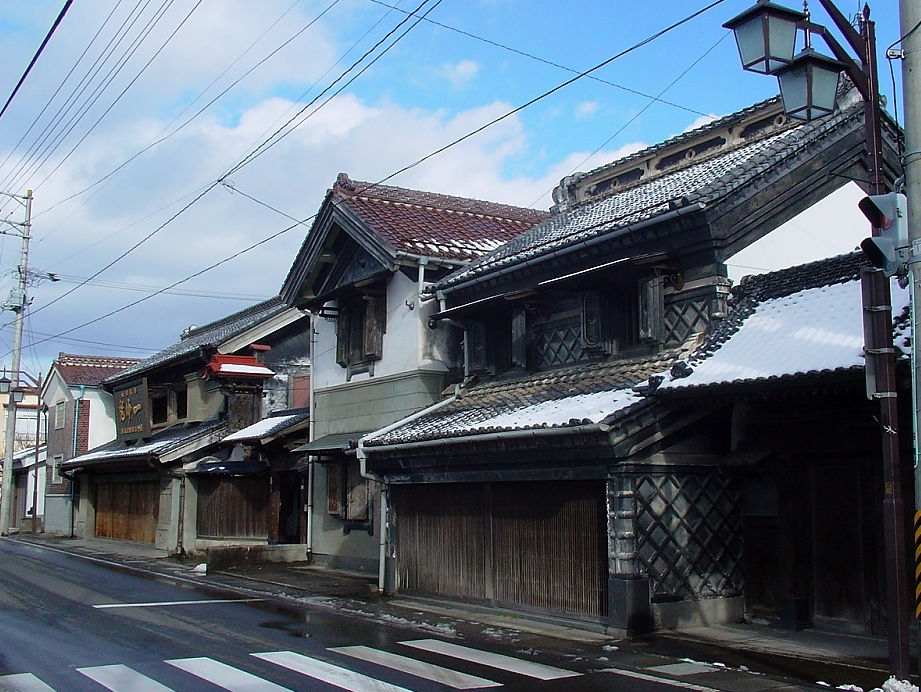
Traditional buildings in downtown Murata

Murata (村田町, Murata-machi) is a town located in Miyagi Prefecture, Japan. As of 31 May 2020, the town had an estimated population of 10,675, and a population density of 140 persons per km^{2} in 4026 households. The total area of the town is 78.38 square kilometres (30.26 sq mi). In September 2014, the 7.4 hectare old centre of town was protected as an Important Preservation District by the national government for its traditional merchant quarter architecture.

== Geography ==
Murata is located in south-central Miyagi Prefecture in the Tōhoku region of northern Japan. The Shiroishi River runs through the town.

=== Neighboring municipalities ===
Miyagi Prefecture

- Iwanuma
- Kawasaki
- Natori
- Ōgawara
- Sendai
- Shibata
- Zaō

=== Climate ===
Murata has a humid subtropical climate (Köppen climate classification Cfa) characterized by mild summers and cold winters. The average annual temperature in Murata is 12.5 °C. The average annual rainfall is 1271 mm with September as the wettest month. The temperatures are highest on average in August, at around 25.0 °C, and lowest in January, at around 1.5 °C.

== Demographics ==
Per Japanese census data, the population of Murata declined over the past 30 years.

Historical population
Year	Pop.	±%
1950	16,049	—
1960	15,015	−6.4%
1970	13,337	−11.2%
1980	13,370	+0.2%
1990	13,632	+2.0%
2000	13,166	−3.4%
2010	11,995	−8.9%
2020	10,666	−11.1%

== History ==
The area of present-day Murata was part of ancient Mutsu Province, and was part of the holdings of Sendai Domain under the Edo period Tokugawa shogunate. The modern village of Murata was established on April 1, 1889, with the establishment of post-Meiji restoration modern municipalities system. It was promoted to town status on October 31, 1895. The town merged with the neighboring towns on Tomioka and Numabe on April 20, 1955.

== Government ==
Murata has a mayor-council form of government with a directly elected mayor and a unicameral town council of 12 members. Murata, collectively with the other municipalities in Shibata District contributes two seats to the Miyagi Prefectural legislature. In terms of national politics, the town is part of Miyagi 3rd district of the lower house of the Diet of Japan.

== Economy ==
The economy of Murata is largely based on agriculture, and the town is especially known for its production of fava beans.

== Education ==
Murata has two public elementary schools and two public middle schools operated by the town government, and one public high school operated by the Miyagi Prefectural Board of Education.

== Transportation ==
=== Railway ===
- Murata does not have any passenger train service.

=== Highway ===
- Tōhoku Expressway – Murata Interchange – Murata Junction
- Yamagata Expressway – Murata Junction
- National Route 4

== Sister cities ==
- Buckley, Flintshire, Wales

== Local attractions ==
- Sportsland SUGO
