= Zaō, Miyagi =

Town in Tōhoku, Japan

Zaō 蔵王町
- Town
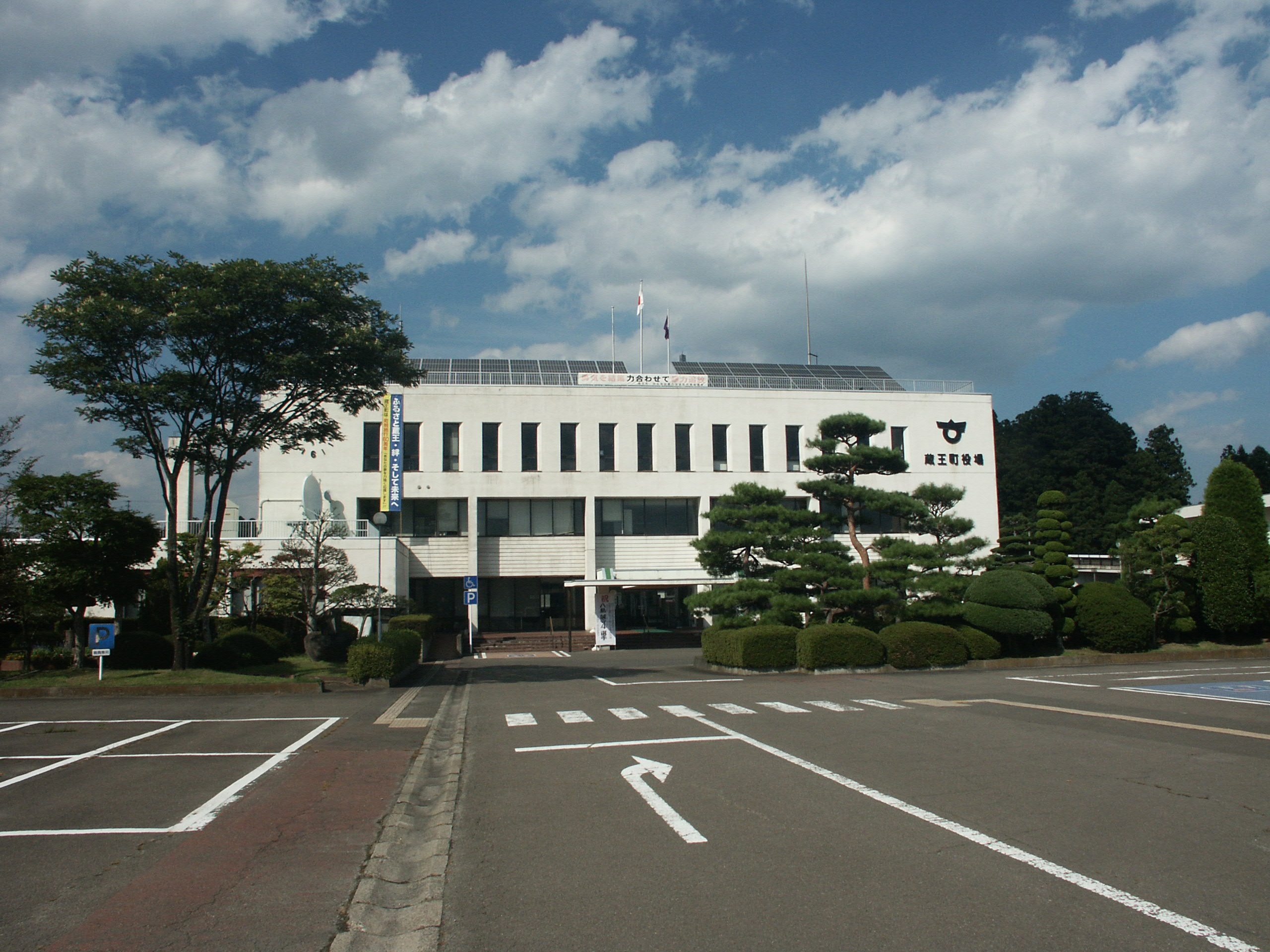
- Zao Town Hall

- Flag Seal

- Location of Zaō in Miyagi Prefecture

- Coordinates: 39°05′53.1″N 140°39′31.2″E
- Country: Japan
- Region: Tōhoku
- Prefecture: Miyagi
- District: Katta

Government
  - Mayor: Murakami Eijin

Area
  - Total: 152.83 km^{2} (59.01 sq mi)

Population (May 31, 2020)
  - Total: 11,790
  - Density: 77.14/km^{2} (199.8/sq mi)
- Time zone: UTC+9 (Japan Standard Time)
- Phone number: 0224-33-2211
- Address: 10 Oji-Enta-ji-Nishiurakita, Zaō-machi, Katta-gun, Miyagi-ken 989-0892
- Climate: Cfa
- Website: Official website
- Symbols
- Flower: Peach
- Tree: Japanese white pine

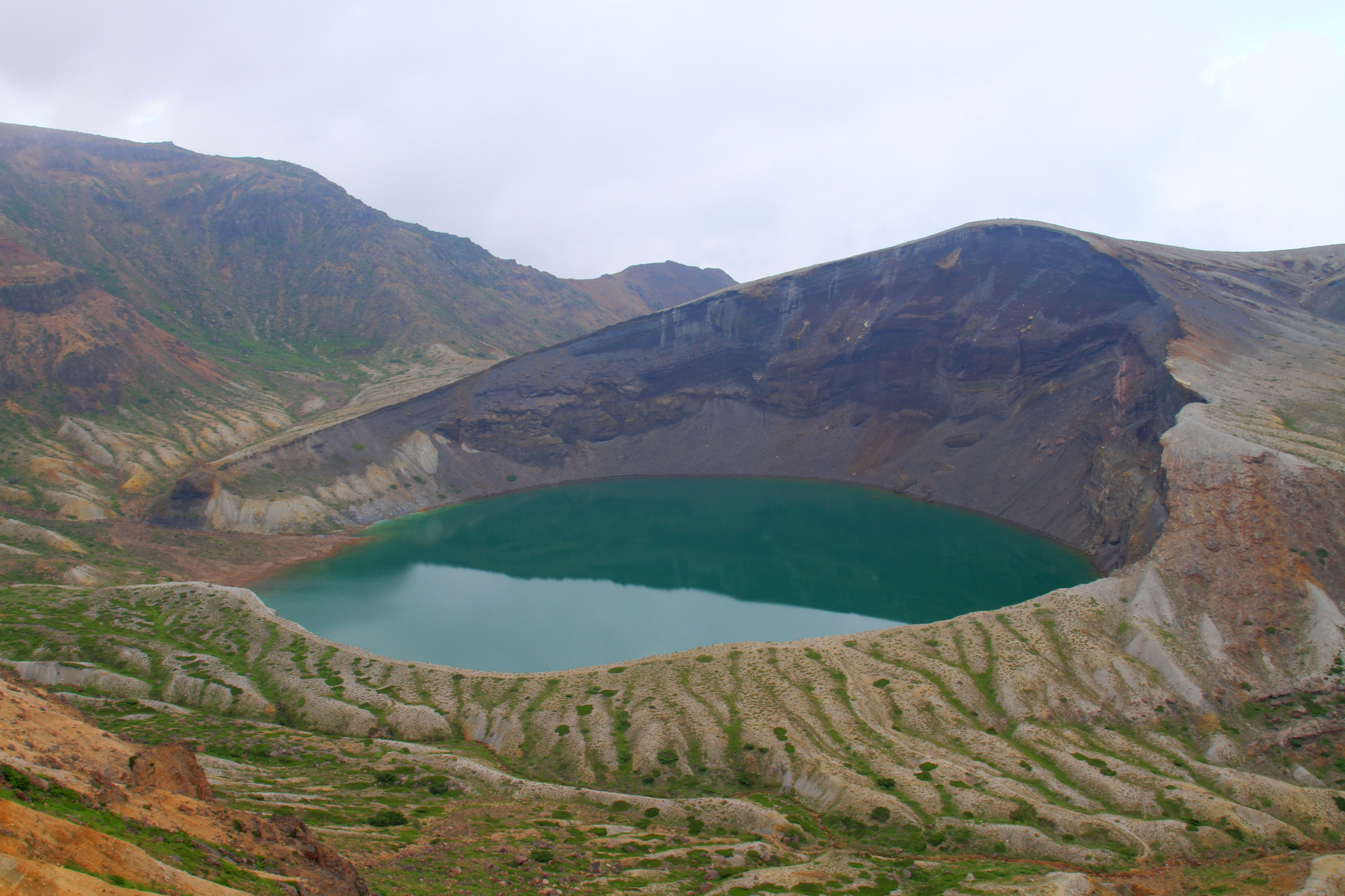
Okama crater at Mount Zaō

Zaō (蔵王町, Zaō-machi) is a town located in Miyagi Prefecture, Japan. As of 31 March 2020, the town had an estimated population of 11,790, and a population density of 77 persons per km^{2} in 4,493 households. The total area of the town is 152.84 square kilometres (59.01 sq mi).

== Geography ==
Zaō is located in the Tōhoku region of northern Japan in southwestern Miyagi Prefecture in the Ōu Mountains, bordered by Yamagata Prefecture to the west. Parts of the town are within the borders of Zaō Quasi-National Park and Zaō Kōgen Prefectural Natural Park.

=== Neighboring municipalities ===
Miyagi Prefecture

- Kawasaki
- Murata
- Ōgawara
- Shichikashuku
- Shiroishi

Yamagata Prefecture

- Kaminoyama

=== Climate ===
Zaō has a humid subtropical climate (Köppen climate classification Cfa) characterized by mild summers and cold winters. The average annual temperature in Zaō is 11.7 °C (53.1 °F). The average annual rainfall is 1,343.9 mm (52.91 in) with September as the wettest month. The temperatures are highest on average in August, at around 23.8 °C (74.8 °F), and lowest in January, at around 0.6 °C (33.1 °F).

Climate data for Zaō (2005−2020 normals, extremes 2005−present)
Month	Jan	Feb	Mar	Apr	May	Jun	Jul	Aug	Sep	Oct	Nov	Dec	Year
Record high °C (°F)	15.0 (59.0)	18.8 (65.8)	23.9 (75.0)	30.3 (86.5)	32.9 (91.2)	35.9 (96.6)	36.5 (97.7)	37.0 (98.6)	36.5 (97.7)	29.7 (85.5)	23.8 (74.8)	19.2 (66.6)	37.0 (98.6)
Mean daily maximum °C (°F)	5.4 (41.7)	6.4 (43.5)	10.4 (50.7)	15.5 (59.9)	21.5 (70.7)	24.2 (75.6)	27.0 (80.6)	29.0 (84.2)	25.2 (77.4)	19.7 (67.5)	13.8 (56.8)	7.9 (46.2)	17.2 (62.9)
Daily mean °C (°F)	0.6 (33.1)	1.1 (34.0)	4.4 (39.9)	9.3 (48.7)	15.1 (59.2)	18.7 (65.7)	22.3 (72.1)	23.8 (74.8)	19.8 (67.6)	14.0 (57.2)	7.9 (46.2)	2.8 (37.0)	11.7 (53.0)
Mean daily minimum °C (°F)	−3.8 (25.2)	−3.7 (25.3)	−1.2 (29.8)	3.2 (37.8)	9.2 (48.6)	14.3 (57.7)	19.0 (66.2)	20.2 (68.4)	15.8 (60.4)	9.1 (48.4)	2.8 (37.0)	−1.6 (29.1)	6.9 (44.5)
Record low °C (°F)	−11.6 (11.1)	−12.3 (9.9)	−7.8 (18.0)	−5.3 (22.5)	0.5 (32.9)	4.6 (40.3)	11.3 (52.3)	11.4 (52.5)	6.5 (43.7)	1.2 (34.2)	−5.1 (22.8)	−7.8 (18.0)	−12.3 (9.9)
Average precipitation mm (inches)	46.1 (1.81)	37.1 (1.46)	72.2 (2.84)	101.0 (3.98)	106.0 (4.17)	146.0 (5.75)	183.4 (7.22)	172.6 (6.80)	199.2 (7.84)	162.2 (6.39)	50.4 (1.98)	63.2 (2.49)	1,343.9 (52.91)
Average precipitation days (≥ 1.0 mm)	7.0	5.9	7.9	8.1	9.2	11.2	15.4	12.2	12.4	8.9	6.8	9.3	114.3
Mean monthly sunshine hours	144.1	145.3	173.5	181.6	195.3	143.7	110.4	140.5	124.6	133.6	138.7	128.5	1,756.3
Source: Japan Meteorological Agency

== Demographics ==
Per Japanese census data, the population of Zaō has declined by approximately 30 percent from its peak in the 1950s.

Historical population
Year	Pop.	±%
1920	10,384	—
1930	11,397	+9.8%
1940	13,750	+20.6%
1950	16,474	+19.8%
1960	15,901	−3.5%
1970	14,037	−11.7%
1980	13,833	−1.5%
1990	14,074	+1.7%
2000	13,545	−3.8%
2010	12,882	−4.9%
2020	11,418	−11.4%

== History ==
The area of present-day Zaō was part of ancient Mutsu Province, and was part of the holdings of Sendai Domain under the Edo period Tokugawa shogunate. It was made part Katta District in the new Iwaki Province at the start of the Meiji period. The district was transferred to Miyagi Prefecture on 21 August 1876. The villages of Enda and Miyamura was established on April 1, 1889 with the establishment of the post-Meiji restoration modern municipalities system. The two villages merged on April 1, 1955 to form the town of Zaō.

== Government ==
Zaō has a mayor-council form of government with a directly elected mayor and a unicameral town council of 16 members. Zaō, collectively with the city of Shiroishi and the town of Shichikashuku, contributes two seats to the Miyagi Prefectural legislature. In terms of national politics, the town is part of Miyagi 3rd district of the lower house of the Diet of Japan.

== Economy ==
The economy of Zaō is largely based on agriculture (primarily through the use of polytunnels) and forestry and seasonal tourism.

== Education ==
Zaō has five public elementary schools and three public middle schools operated by the town government, and one public high school operated by the Miyagi Prefectural Board of Education.

== Transportation ==
Zaō does not have any passenger train service.

=== Highway ===
- Tōhoku Expressway – Zaō Parking Area
- National Route 4
- National Route 457

== Local attractions ==
- Mount Zaō
- Sankai Falls
- Zaō Kōgen Prefectural Natural Park
- Zaō Quasi-National Park
