= Natori River =

River in Miyagi Prefecture, Japan

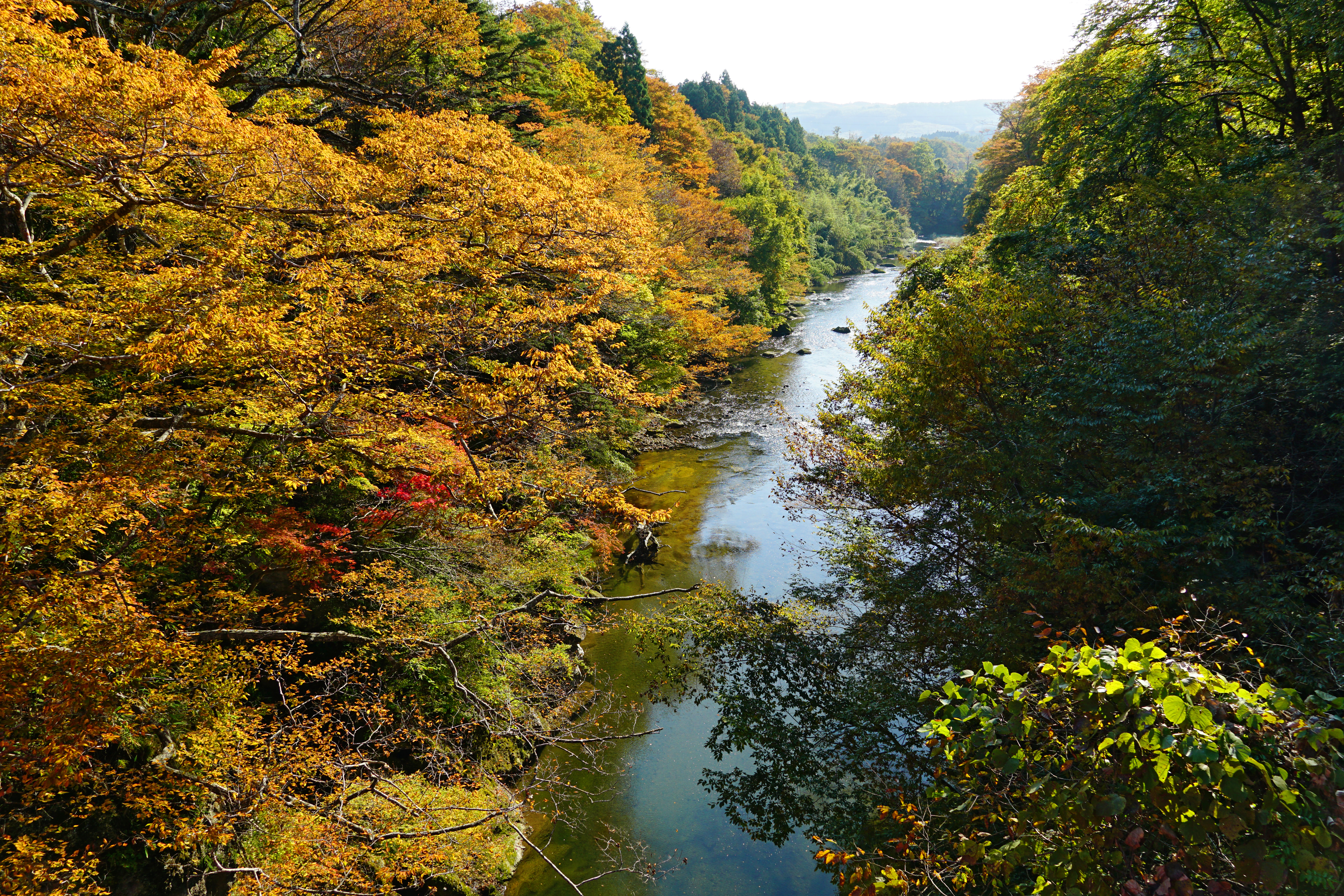
- Natori River at Akiu Onsen in Sendai

- Native name: 名取川 (Japanese)

Location
- Country: Japan

Physical characteristics
- Source
  - location: Ōu Mountains
  - elevation: 1,356 m (4,449 ft)
- Mouth: Sendai
  - location: Pacific Ocean
  - elevation: 0 m (0 ft)
- Length: 55 km (34 mi)
- Basin size: 939 km^{2} (363 sq mi)
- Discharge
  - average: 16.3 m^{3}/s (580 cu ft/s)
- National Palace of Scenic Beauty Natori River (Miyagi Prefecture) Natori River (Japan)

The Natori River (名取川, Natorigawa) is a Class A river located in central Miyagi prefecture, in the Tōhoku region of northern Japan. It starts at Mount Kamuro in the Ōu Mountains and flows in an easterly direction through the cities of Natori and Sendai. The river's headwaters start in the Zao Mountain range, it flows through the Sendai Plain and ends by draining into Sendai Bay. The river's estuary is located on Japan's east coast, and faces the Pacific Ocean. The river's flow is the greatest during the snow melt season from March to April, the rainy season from June to July and during the typhoon season from September to October. The river's length is 55 km (34 mi), and its tributaries are the Hirose, Masuda and Goishi Rivers. The Natori provides water for 1 million people in the city of Sendai.

== Basin ==
The river's basin is 939 km^{2} (363 sq mi) and has two primary reservoirs, the Okura dam reservoir and the Kamafusa Dam reservoir, both of which serve as regulators of flood control and for the supply of water. In the event of the river flooding, the dams serve to control and reduce water flow to lower basins.

== Futakuchi Ravine ==
On the upper reaches of the Natori River, on the boundary between Miyagi Prefecture and Yamagata Prefecture, the river passes through a beautiful eight kilometer long ravine with cliffs, rock formations and pools called the Futakuchi-kyōkoku (二口峡谷). The ravine contains the Akiu Great Falls, one of "Japan’s Top 100 Waterfalls", in a listing published by the Japanese Ministry of the Environment in 1990 and a nationally designated Place of Scenic Beauty.

The ravine also contains the Banji (磐司岩, Banji-iwa), a monolithic cliff of tuff with a width of 150 metres (490 ft) and length of three kilometres (1.9 mi), which has been eroded into vertical columns. This cliff is also a nationally designated Place of Scenic Beauty.

The northern part of the ravine is within the borders of the Zao Quasi-National Park, and the middle and southern portions are part of a Prefectural park. At the southern end of the ravine is the Akiho Onsen, a hot spring resort area.
