= Akiu Great Falls =

Akiu Great Falls 秋保大滝 (Akiu Ōtaki)
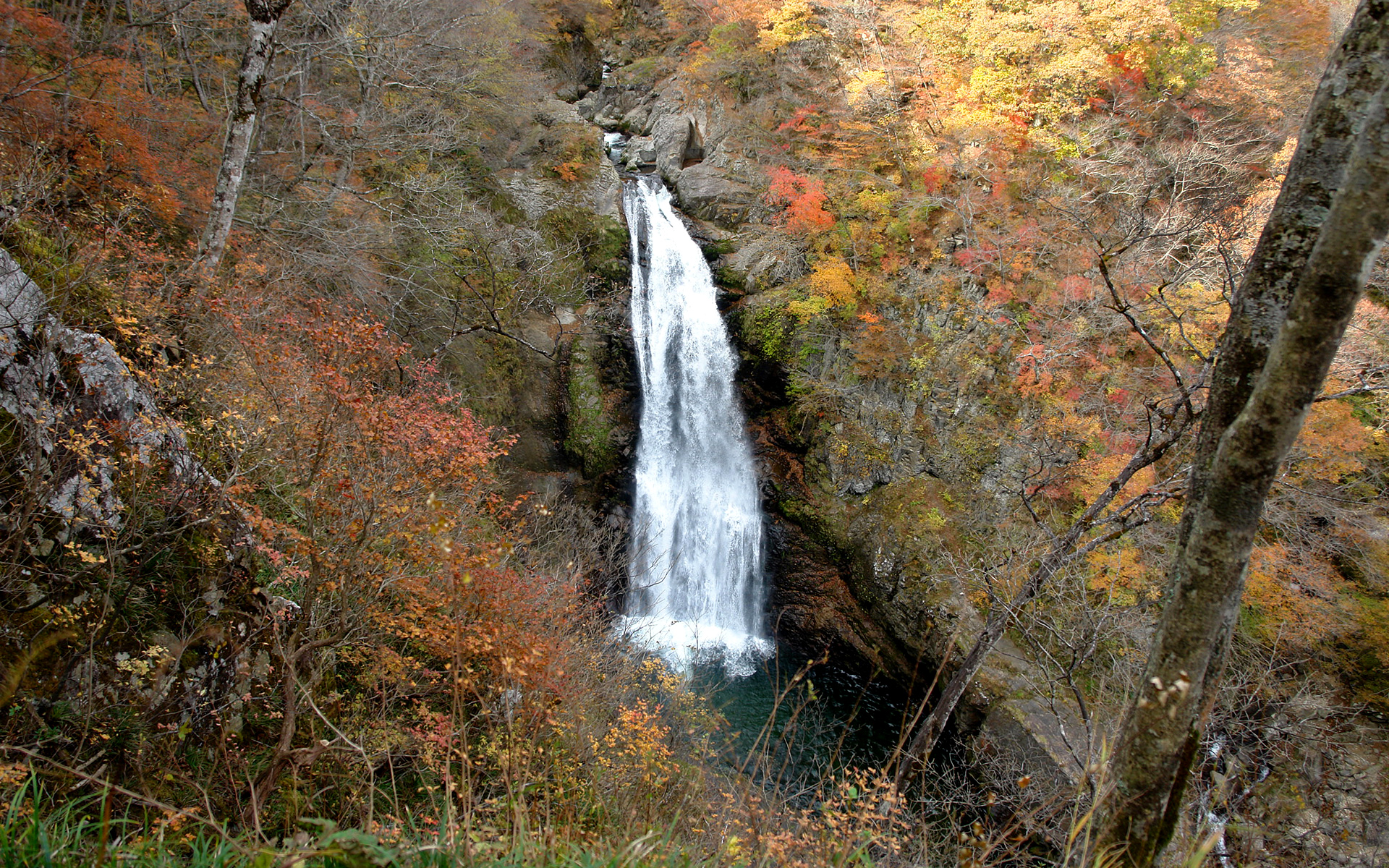

- Location within Sendai Location within Miyagi Prefecture Location within Japan
- Location: Taihaku-ku, Sendai, Miyagi Prefecture, Japan
- Coordinates: 38°16′29.7″N 140°36′10.5″E
- Total height: 55 m (180 ft)
- Average width: 6 m (20 ft)
- National Palace of Scenic Beauty

Akiu Great Falls (秋保大滝, Akiu Ōtaki) is a waterfall located in Taihaku-ku, Sendai, Miyagi Prefecture, Japan. It is a nationally designated Place of Scenic Beauty. It is one of "Japan’s Top 100 Waterfalls", in a listing published by the Japanese Ministry of the Environment in 1990.

== Overview ==
The falls are located on the upper reaches of the Natori River, within the borders of both the Zaō Quasi-National Park and the Futakuchi Kyokoku Prefectural Park. The falls have a height of 55 metres (180 ft) and width of 5 metres (16 ft). According to legend, the falls were discovered by the priest Ennin in the early Heian period, when he was founding the temple of Yama-dera in Dewa Province. In 1825, a small Buddhist chapel dedicated to Fudō Myōō was erected near the base of the falls.

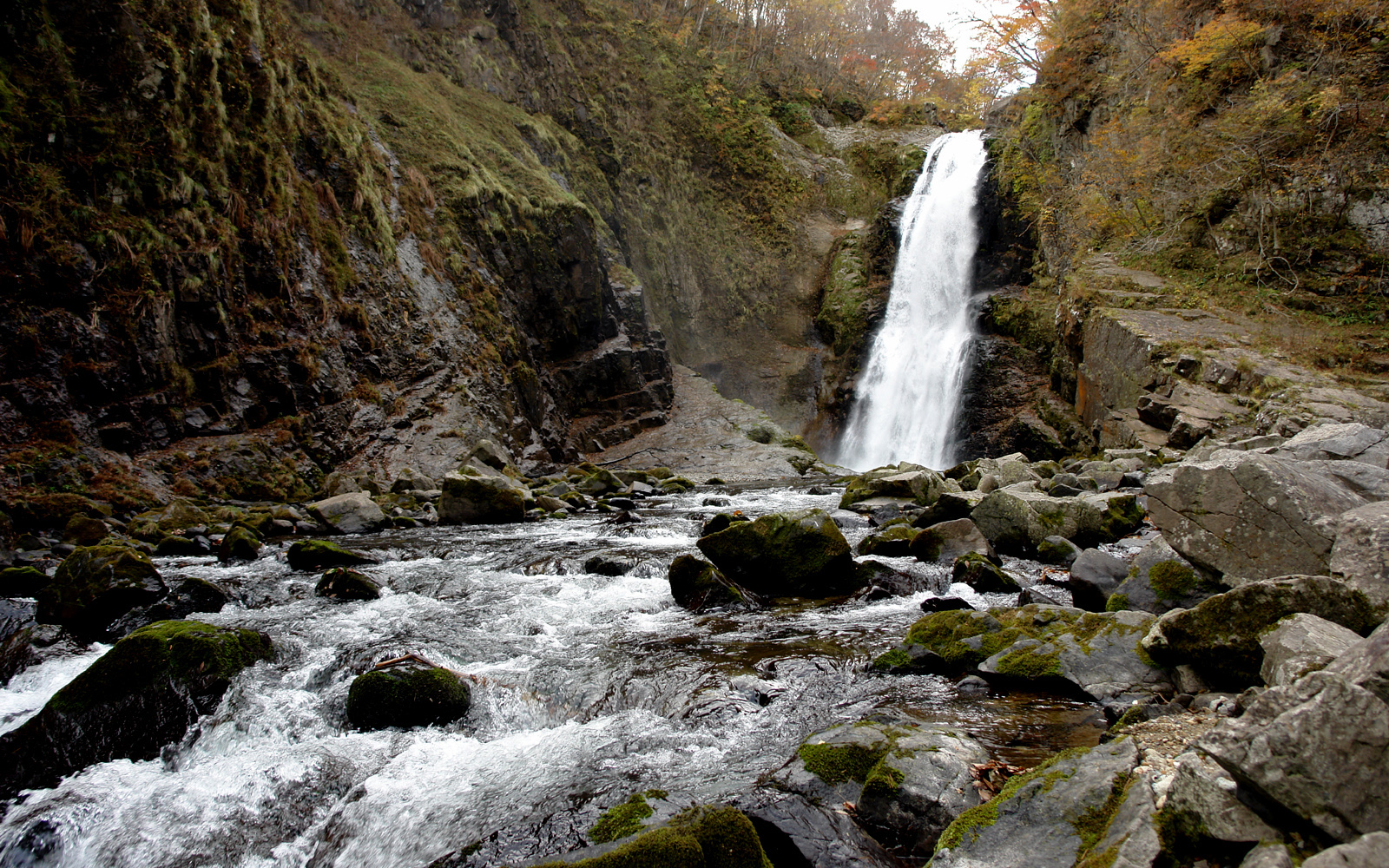
Akiu Fall from base

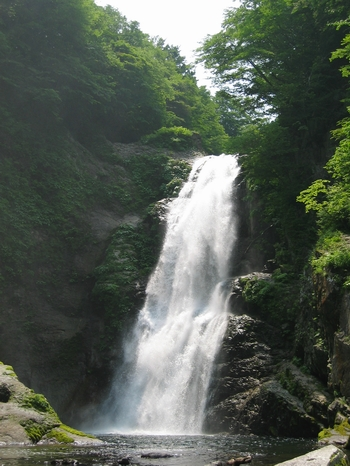
Akiu Falls in May

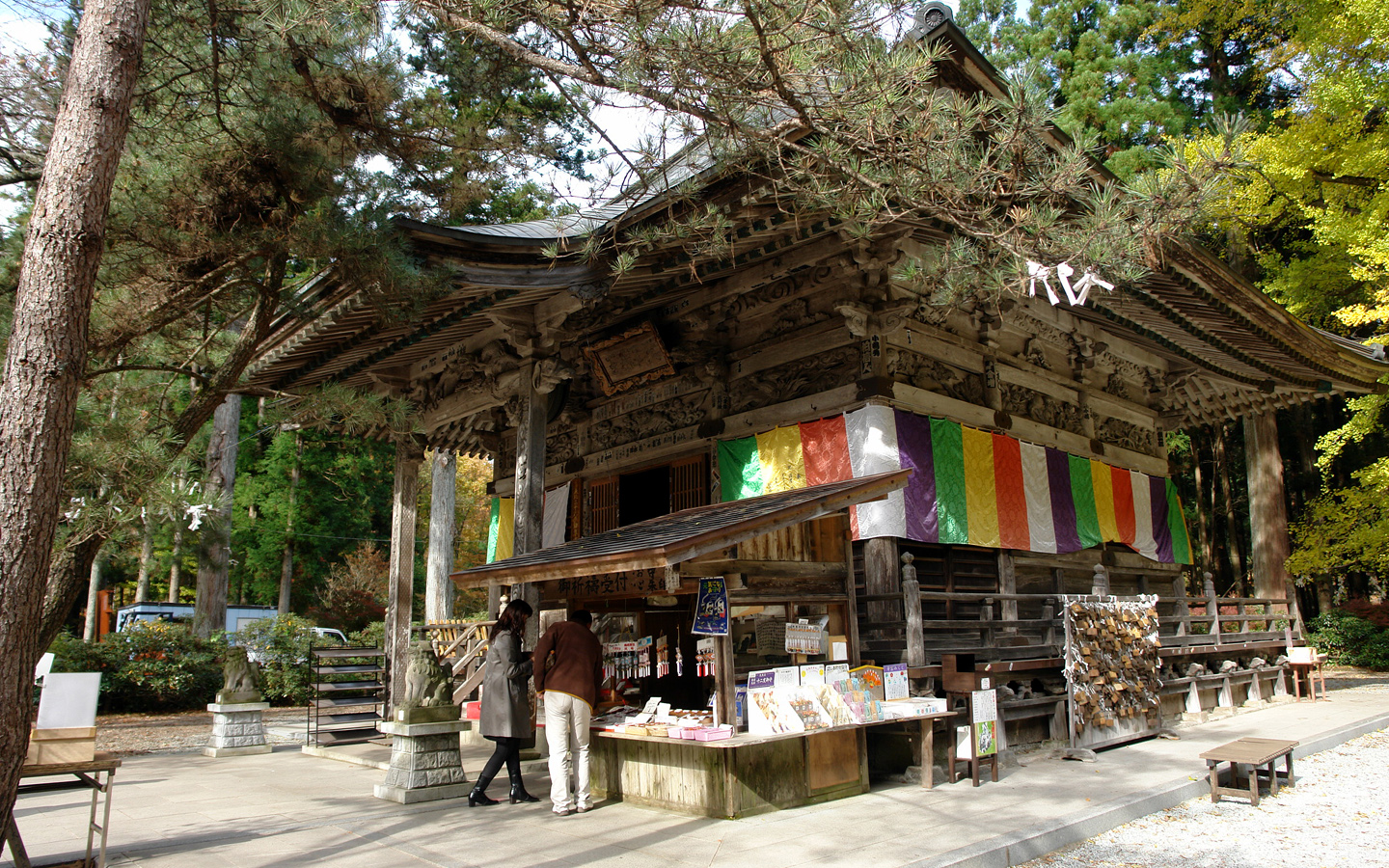
Akui Otaki Fudo chapel

== See also ==
- Japan's Top 100 Waterfalls
- List of waterfalls
- List of Places of Scenic Beauty of Japan (Miyagi)
