= Ōgawara, Miyagi =

Ōgawara 大河原町
- Town
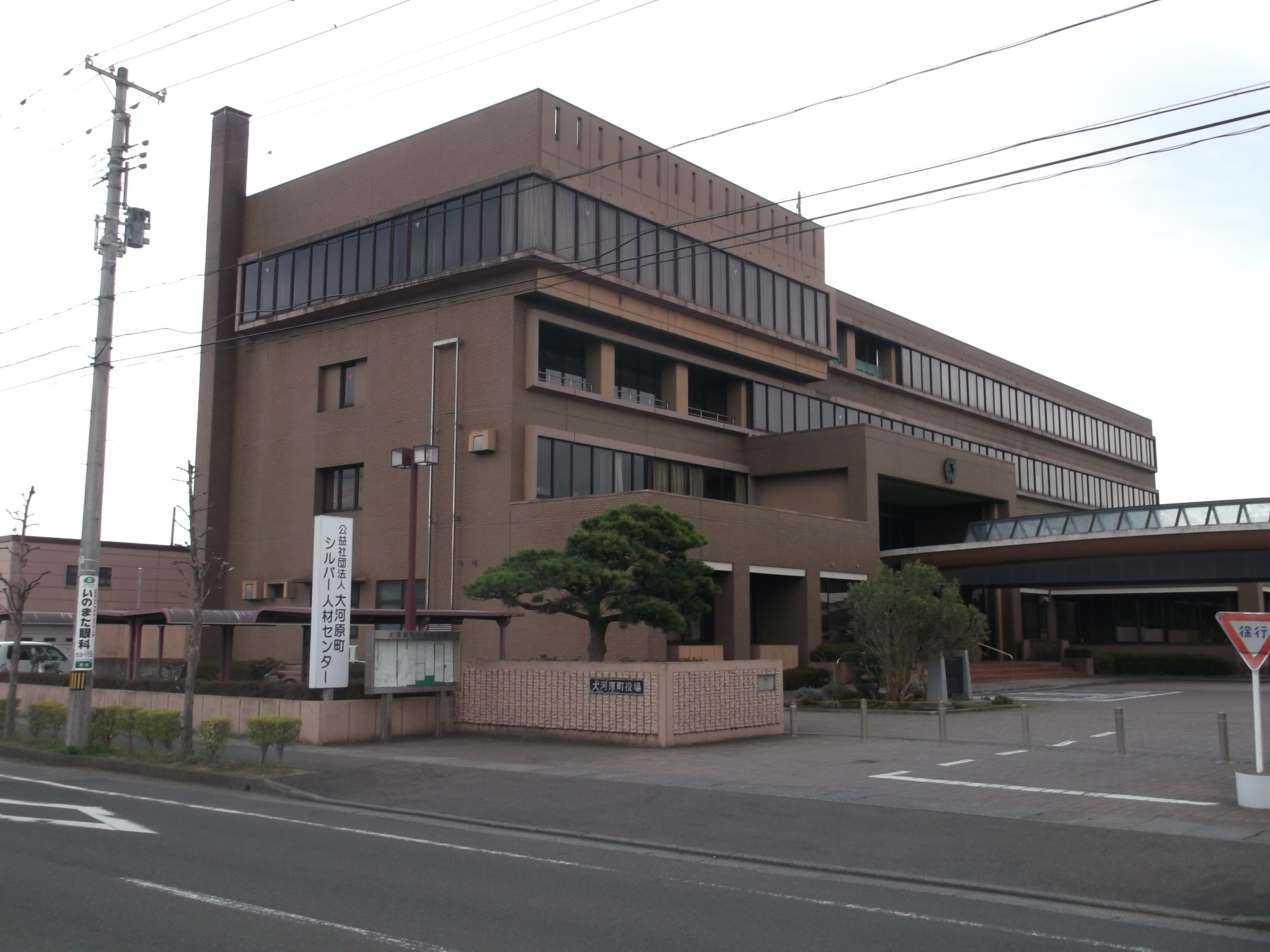
- Ōgawara Town Office

- Flag Seal

- Location of Ōgawara in Miyagi Prefecture

- Coordinates: 38°02′57.8″N 140°43′50.7″E
- Country: Japan
- Region: Tōhoku
- Prefecture: Miyagi
- District: Shibata

Area
  - Total: 24.99 km^{2} (9.65 sq mi)

Population (May 31, 2020)
  - Total: 23,618
  - Density: 945.1/km^{2} (2,448/sq mi)
- Time zone: UTC+9 (Japan Standard Time)
- Tree: Prunus mume
- Flower: Sakura
- Bird: Swan
- Phone number: 0224-53-2111
- Address: 19 Shin-minami, Ōgawara-machi, Shibata-gun, Miyagi-ken 989-1295
- Website: Official website

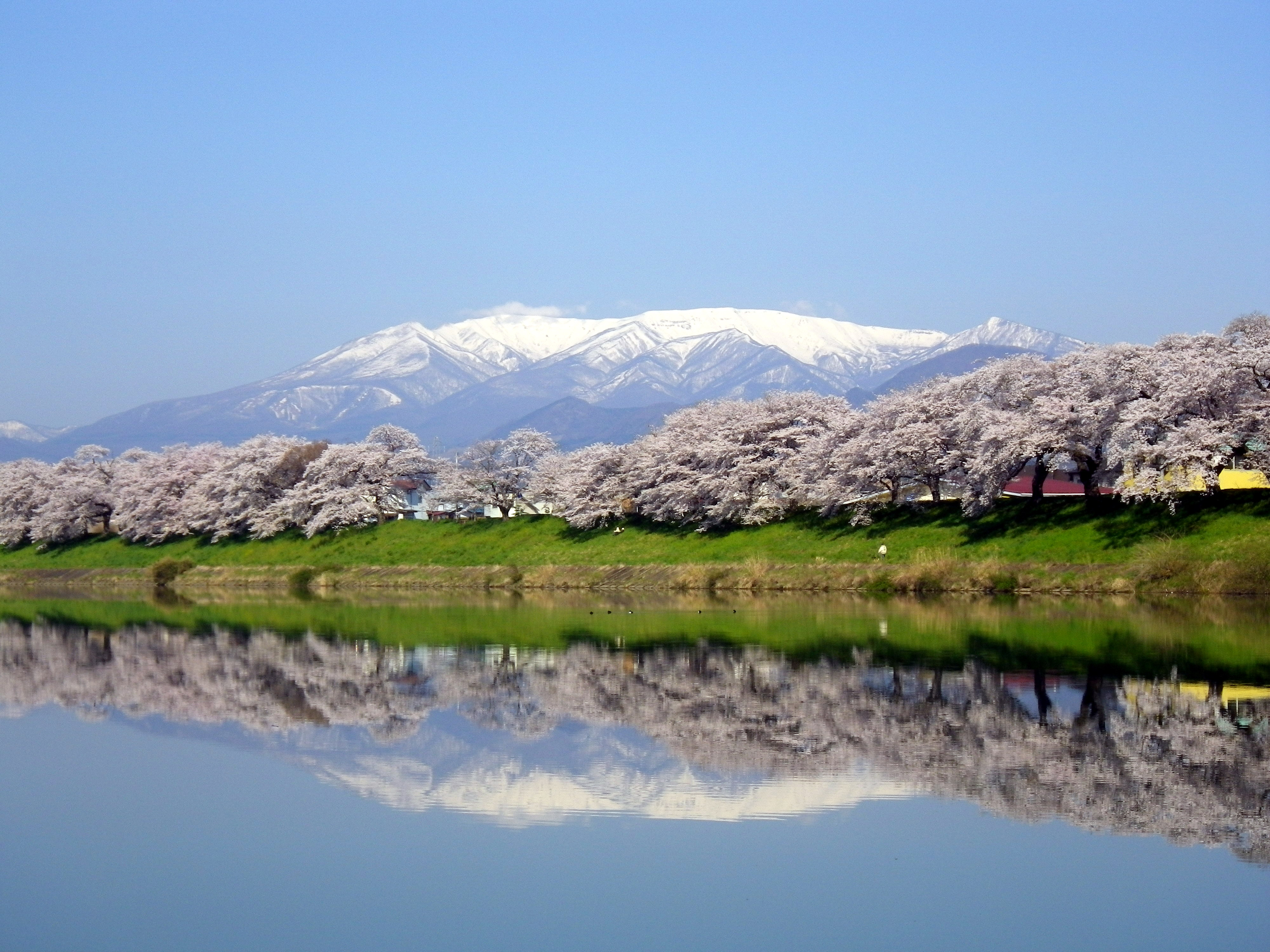
Mount Zao from Ōgawara

Ōgawara (大河原町, Ōgawara-machi) is a town located in Miyagi Prefecture, Japan. As of 31 March 2020, the town had an estimated population of 23,618, and a population density of 950persons per km^{2} in 9,925 households. The total area of the town is 24.99 square kilometres (9.65 sq mi).

== Geography ==
Ōgawara is located in south-central Miyagi Prefecture, in the Tōhoku region of northern Japan. The Shiroishi River runs through the town.

=== Neighboring municipalities ===
Miyagi Prefecture

- Kakuda
- Murata
- Shibata
- Shiroishi
- Zaō

=== Climate ===
Ōgawara has a humid subtropical climate (Köppen climate classification Cfa) characterized by mild summers and cold winters. The average annual temperature in Ōgawara is 12.5 °C. The average annual rainfall is 1272 mm with September as the wettest month. The temperatures are highest on average in August, at around 24.9 °C, and lowest in January, at around 1.4 °C.

== Demographics ==
Per Japanese census data, the population of Ōgawara has steadily increased over the past 60 years.

Historical population
Year	Pop.	±%
1920	8,536	—
1930	9,957	+16.6%
1940	10,642	+6.9%
1950	15,656	+47.1%
1960	15,279	−2.4%
1970	16,033	+4.9%
1980	19,332	+20.6%
1990	20,901	+8.1%
2000	22,767	+8.9%
2010	23,530	+3.4%
2020	23,571	+0.2%

== History ==
The area of present-day Ōgawara was part of ancient Mutsu Province, and was part of the holdings of Sendai Domain under the Edo period Tokugawa shogunate. The town of Ōgawara was established on April 1, 1889, with the establishment of the post-Meiji restoration modern municipalities system. The town annexed the neighboring village of Kanegase on September 30, 1955. However, an effort to merge Ōgawara with the neighboring towns of Shibata and Murata in 2002 was rejected by the town assembly in 2004.

== Government ==
Ōgawara has a mayor-council form of government with a directly elected mayor and a unicameral town council of 15 members. Ōgawara, collectively with the other municipalities in Shibata District contributes two seats to the Miyagi Prefectural legislature. In terms of national politics, the town is part of Miyagi 3rd district of the lower house of the Diet of Japan.

== Economy ==
The economy of Ōgawara is largely based on agriculture.

== Education ==
Ōgawara has three public elementary schools and two public middle schools operated by the town government, and two public high schools operated by the Miyagi Prefectural Board of Education. The prefecture also operates one special education school for the handicapped.

== Transportation ==
=== Railway ===
East Japan Railway Company (JR East) - Tōhoku Main Line

- Ōgawara

=== Highway ===
- Tōhoku Expressway
- National Route 4
