= Zaō Quasi-National Park =

Quasi-National Park

- 蔵王国定公園
- IUCN category V (protected landscape/seascape)
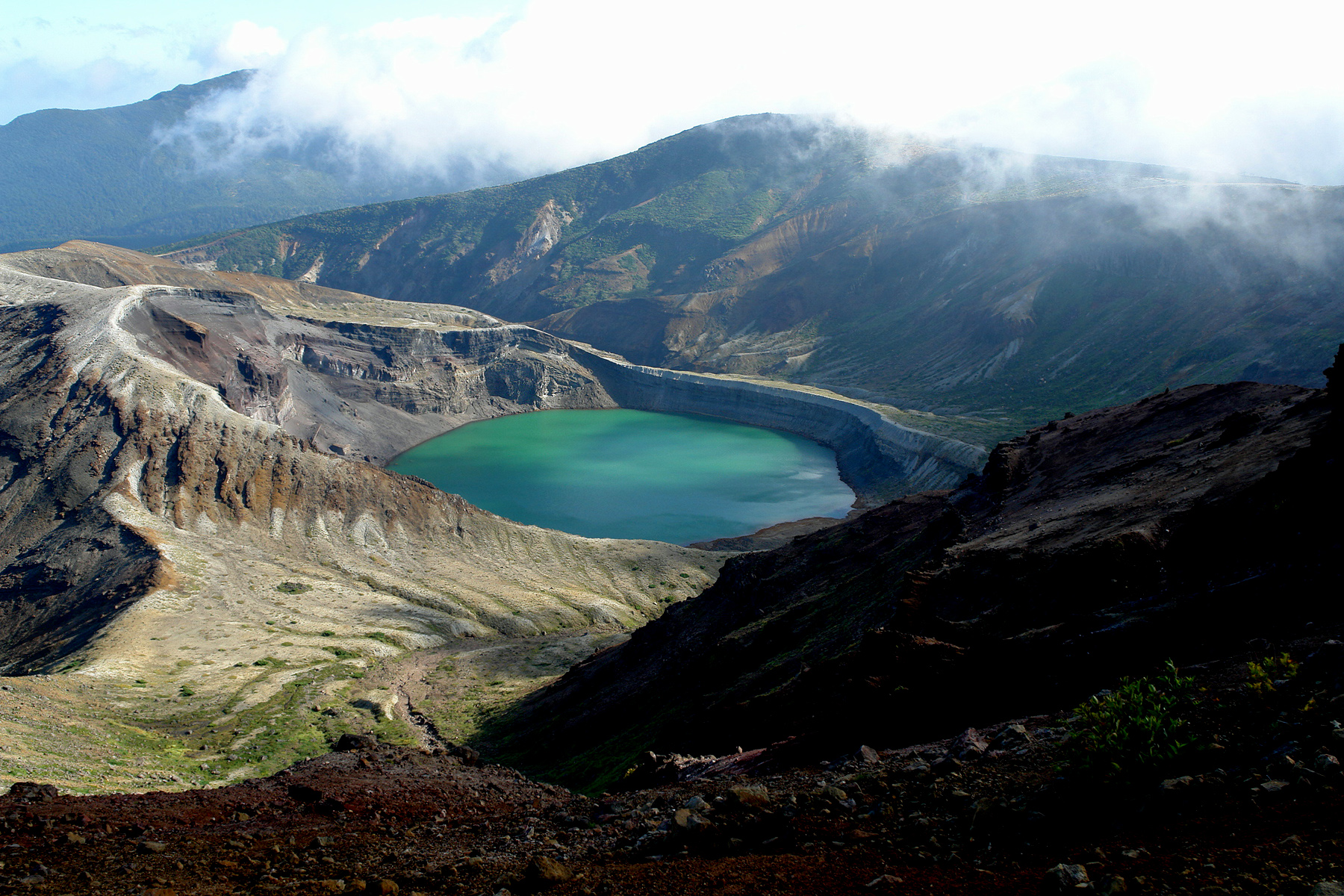
- Mount Zaō

- Location within Miyagi Prefecture Location within Japan
- Location: Tōhoku, Japan
- Coordinates: 38.091°N 140.44°E
- Area: 396.35 km^{2} (153.03 sq mi)
- Established: 8 August 1963
- Governing body: Miyagi Prefecture and Yamagata Prefecture

Zaō Quasi-National Park (蔵王国定公園, Zaō Kokutei Kōen) is a Quasi-National Park that extends in the Ōu Mountains between Miyagi and Yamagata Prefectures, Japan. Established in 1963, the central feature of the park is Mount Zaō. It is rated a protected landscape (Category V) according to the IUCN.

Like all quasi-national parks in Japan, the park is managed by the local prefectural governments, in this case, that of Yamagata and Miyagi prefectures.

== Related municipalities ==
- Miyagi: Kawasaki, Sendai, Shichikashuku, Shiroishi, Zaō
- Yamagata: Kaminoyama, Yamagata

== See also ==
- National Parks of Japan
