= Kawasaki, Miyagi =

Kawasaki 川崎町
- Town
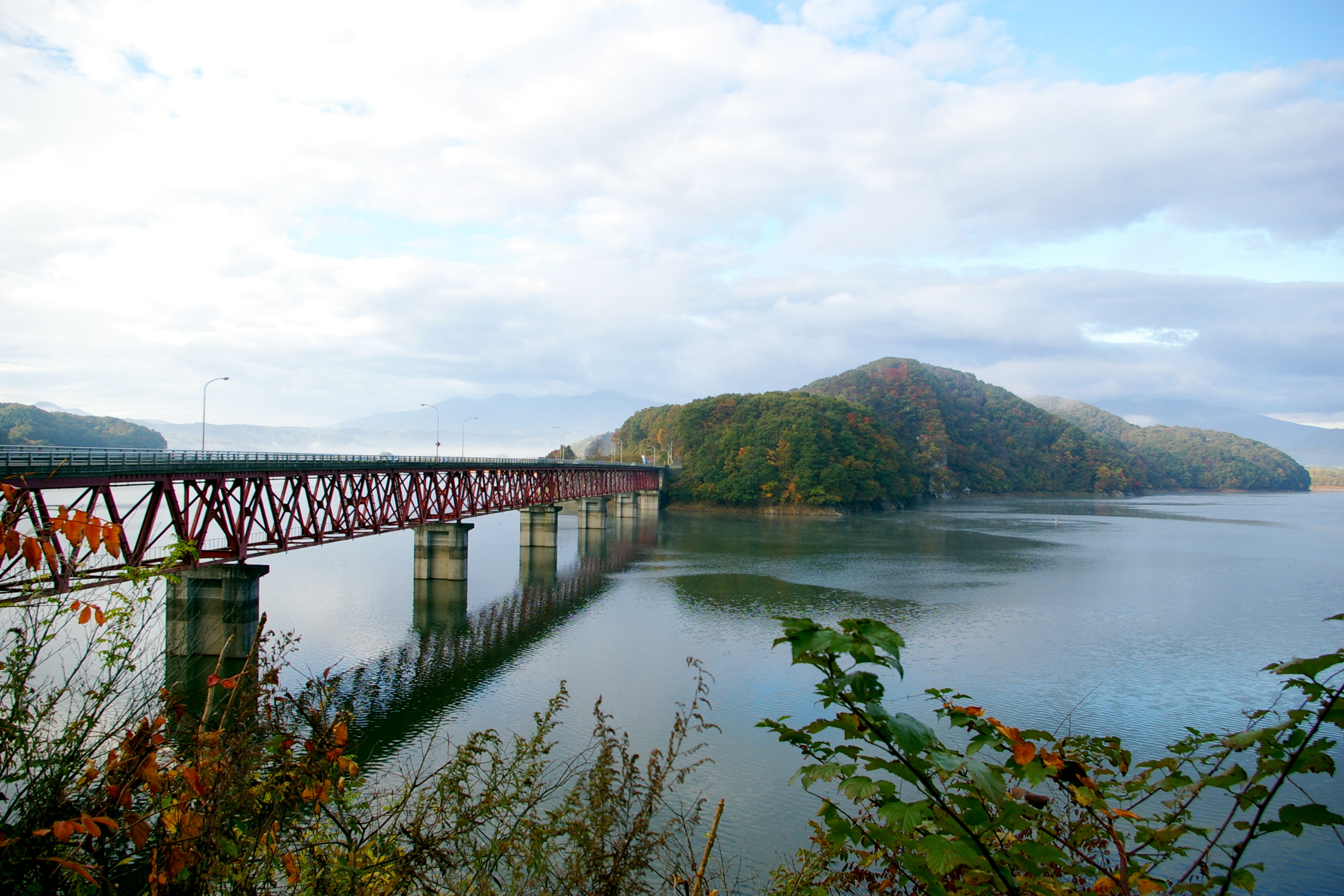
- Kamafusa Lake in Kawasaki

- Flag Seal

- Location of Kawasaki in Miyagi Prefecture

- Coordinates: 38°10′40.4″N 140°38′23″E
- Country: Japan
- Region: Tōhoku
- Prefecture: Miyagi
- District: Shibata

Area
  - Total: 270.77 km^{2} (104.54 sq mi)

Population (May 31, 2020)
  - Total: 8,637
  - Density: 31.90/km^{2} (82.62/sq mi)
- Time zone: UTC+9 (Japan Standard Time)
- Tree: Enkianthus perulatus
- Flower: Rhododendron subg. Hymenanthes
- Phone number: 0224-55-2111
- Address: Maekawa Urate 175-1, Kawasaki-machi, Shibata-gun, Miyagi-ken 989-1592
- Website: Official website

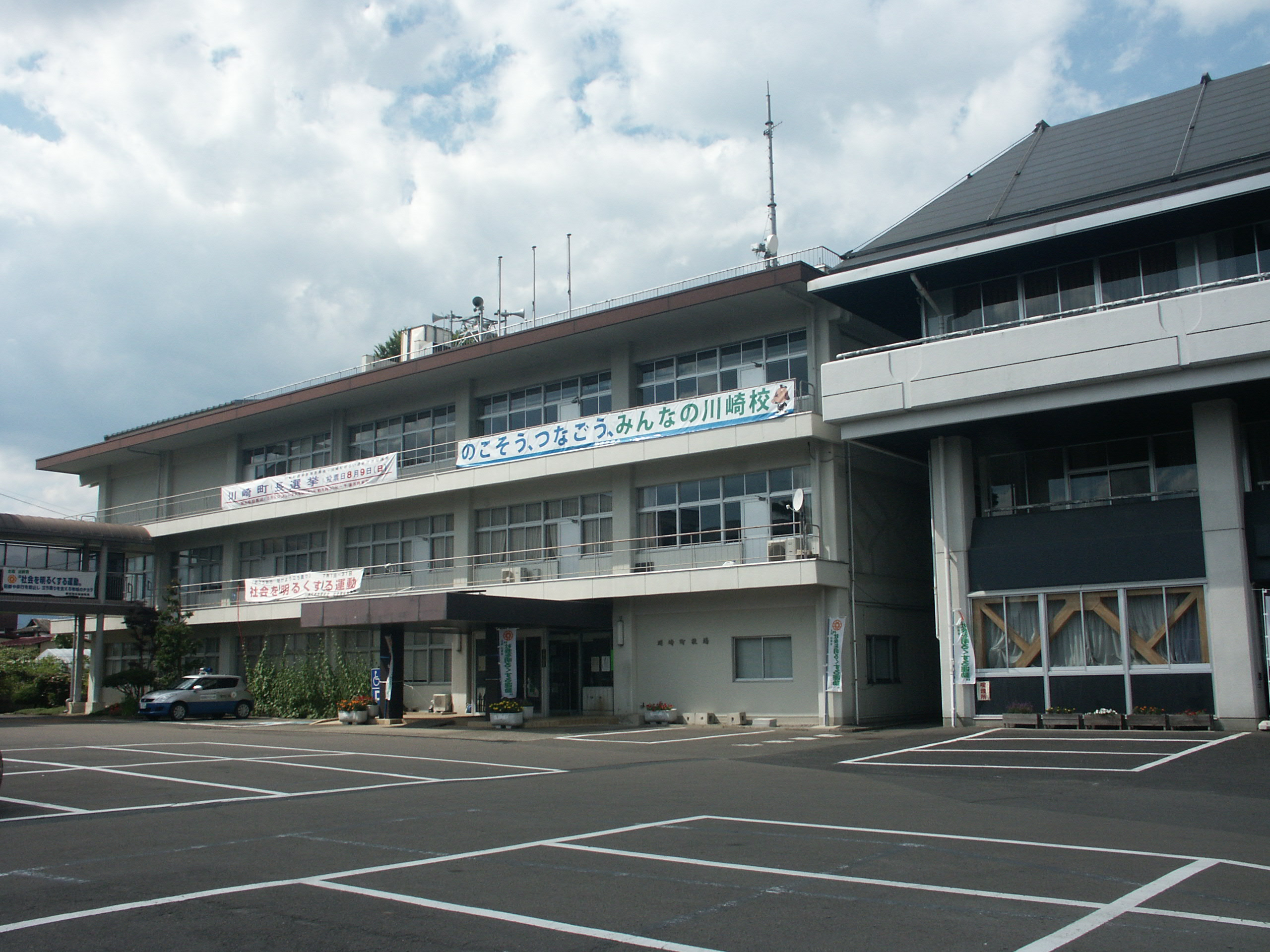
Kawasaki town hall

Kawasaki (川崎町, Kawasaki-machi) is a town located in Miyagi Prefecture, Japan. As of 31 May 2020, the town had an estimated population of 8,637 and a population density of 32 persons per km^{2} in 3,391 households. The total area of the town is 270.77 square kilometres (104.54 sq mi).

== Geography ==
Kawasaki is located in south-western Miyagi Prefecture, bordered by the Ōu Mountains to the west. Mount Zaō (1840.8 meters) is partly within the borders of Kawasaki. About 85% of the town area is classified as mountainous.

=== Neighboring municipalities ===
Miyagi Prefecture

- Sendai
- Murata
- Zaō

Yamagata Prefecture

- Kaminoyama
- Yamagata

=== Climate ===
Kawasaki has a humid subtropical climate (Köppen climate classification Cfa) characterized by mild summers and cold winters. The average annual temperature in Kawasaki is 11.0 °C. The average annual rainfall is 1318 mm with September as the wettest month. The temperatures are highest on average in August, at around 24.1 °C, and lowest in January, at around -0.9 °C.

== Demographics ==
Per Japanese census data, the population of Kawasaki has declined over the past 70 years.

Historical population
Year	Pop.	±%
1950	13,137	—
1960	12,981	−1.2%
1970	10,344	−20.3%
1980	10,636	+2.8%
1990	10,797	+1.5%
2000	10,871	+0.7%
2010	9,978	−8.2%
2020	8,345	−16.4%

== History ==
The area of present-day Kawasaki was part of ancient Mutsu Province, and was part of the holdings of Sendai Domain under the Edo period Tokugawa shogunate. The village of Kawasaki was established on April 1, 1889, with the establishment of post-Meiji restoration modern municipalities system. It was promoted to town status on May 3, 1948. Kawasaki merged with the neighboring town of Tomioka and the former village of Hasekura on April 20, 1955.

== Government ==
Kawasaki has a mayor-council form of government with a directly elected mayor and a unicameral city legislature of 13 members. Kawasaki, collectively with the other municipalities in Shibata District contributes two seats to the Miyagi Prefectural legislature. In terms of national politics, the town is part of Miyagi 3rd district of the lower house of the Diet of Japan.

== Economy ==
The economy of Kawasaki is largely based on agriculture and forestry.

== Education ==
- Kawasaki has four public elementary schools and two public middle schools operated by the town government, one public high school operated by the Miyagi Prefectural Board of Education.

== Transportation ==
=== Railway ===
Kawasaki is not served by any passenger train lines.

=== Highway ===
- Yamagata Expressway: Miyagi-Kawasaki and Sasaya IC
- National Route 286
- National Route 457

== Local attractions ==
- Kamafusa Dam
- Site of Kawasaki Castle
