= Kasuya =

Kasuya may refer to:

== People ==
- Kasuya (surname)

== Places ==
- Kasuya, Fukuoka, town in Kasuya District, Fukuoka Prefecture, Japan
- Kasuya, Tokyo, district of Setagaya, Tokyo, Japan
