= Ga-Rei =

Japanese manga series

- Cover of the first Japanese volume, featuring protagonist Kagura Tsuchimiya

喰霊 (Ga-rei)
- Genre: Action, supernatural
- Manga
- Written by: Hajime Segawa
- Published by: Kadokawa Shoten
- English publisher: BookWalker (digital)
- Magazine: Shōnen Ace
- Original run: October 26, 2005 – January 26, 2010
- Volumes: 12
- Manga

Ga-Rei: Tsuina no Shō
- Written by: Hajime Segawa
- Published by: Kadokawa Shoten
- Magazine: Shōnen Ace
- Original run: July 10, 2007 – June 10, 2008
- Volumes: 1
- Anime television series

Ga-Rei: Zero
- Directed by: Ei Aoki
- Produced by: Atsushi Itō
- Written by: Katsuhiko Takayama
- Music by: Noriyasu Agematsu
- Studio: AIC Spirits; Asread
- Licensed by: AUS: Madman Entertainment; EU: MVM Films; NA: Crunchyroll (Note: Formerly known as Funimation Entertainment)
- Original network: CTC, TV Saitama, tvk, KBS, Sun TV, TVQ, Tokyo MX, TV Aichi, TVh, AT-X
- English network: US: Funimation Channel
- Original run: October 5, 2008 – December 21, 2008
- Episodes: 12
- icon

Ga-Rei (喰霊), is a Japanese manga series written and illustrated by Hajime Segawa. It has been serialized by Kadokawa Shoten in the magazine Shōnen Ace from 2005 to 2010 and collected in twelve tankōbon volumes. The English version was then released digitally on BookWalker on October 29, 2014. A prequel anime series, Ga-Rei: Zero, aired from October 5, 2008, to December 21, 2008, which details the backstory of key characters Kagura and Yomi.

== Plot ==
Kensuke Nimura is just your average high school student—except for the fact that he can see spirits. This ability generally hinders him more than it helps him, especially in trying to get a girlfriend. However, everything changes one day when he encounters Kagura Tsuchimiya while being pursued by evil spirits. They accidentally kiss and manage to destroy the source of energy that is drawing the evil spirits. A few days later, Kagura transfers into Kensuke's class, much to his surprise. Kagura is an agent of a government agency that secretly defends the public from supernatural enemies. She wields a Ga-rei, a "spirit devourer," named Byakuei that she uses to fight. Kensuke's spiritual awareness and his attraction to Kagura compels him to follow her to the agency, where he is recruited to fight the supernatural.

Their first enemy is Yomi Isayama, Kagura's former best friend, now an evil spirit due to a stone known as a sesshouseki embedded in her forehead. Also introduced is another old friend, the perverted Izuna Noriyuki. Yomi tries to release an ancient immortal demon sealed under Tokyo. The Agency manage to stop her after a long battle, resealing the demon and putting Yomi to rest in the process. A mysterious boy removes her sesshouseki and disappears.

The next story arc concerns the re-emergence of the Juugondō organization and its heir, Shizuru Imawano. She encounters and alternatively threatens and flirts with Kensuke, angering Kagura. Soon, a contest begins between her and Kagura as to who can collect more sesshōseki, with Kensuke—and the Kyūbi-kitsune (or nine-tailed fox)—as the prize. The pressure is building as Kagura starts losing control of Byakuei and the Juugondō arrive in full force. Shockingly, Shizuru's long-lost sister Setsuna arrives, kills her father and takes over the Juugondō. She attacks and demolishes the Agency and the government try to distance themselves from the Agency for fear of revealing secrets to the public.

Kagura, Kensuke, Kyouko and Iwahata survive and meet Izuna and Shizuru at an agency hideout. After resting, the group faces off against Setsuna inside Tamamo-no-Mae's garden, with Kagura as the winner. However, Kensuke was gravely injured in the battle, leading Kagura to use the power of the sesshōseki to save his life. As a result, she loses control and becomes the core of the newly created Kyūbi, destroying the center of Tokyo. Kensuke manages to reach the Kyūbi, using his new Michael Revolution sword to free Kagura.

Due to her brief time as the Kyūbi's core, Kagura has suffered amnesia, much to everyone's shock. She and Kensuke resume their daily lives at school, but start investigating ghosts alongside Kensuke, Tanaka, and Izumi, a new student who bears a resemblance to Yomi. Investigations lead the group closer to Naraku, the area in Tokyo destroyed by the Kyūbi and now filled with spirits. Kensuke later meets Mikado and Tsuina from the Agency. A few days later, Kensuke and Izumi are attacked by Kirin, a black wolflike monster from Naraku, who cuts Kensuke's right eye. Izumi is later revealed to be Yomi, who has dissociative identity disorder, alternating between Yomi and Izumi. When the revived Agency imprisons Izumi with the intention of exorcising Yomi, which will likely kill Izumi as well, Kagura breaks her free and the two go on the run. Kagura resolves to defend Yomi, disregarding others' opinions. Fending evil spirits and eventually the escorts of the Black Priestess—Yomi—they are cornered on a snow-covered cliff. There, Kensuke and Tsuina arrive to save them, leading to Kagura completely regaining her memories. The ensuing ruckus causes the cliff to collapse, causing them to fall near Micheal Kohara's residence, where Izuna and Shizune find them unconscious.

After recovering, Kensuke and the others learn of Earth's impending destruction at the Black Priestess's (Yomi) hands and the White Priestess's (Kagura) potential to stop it. While everyone recuperates from resulting disbelief, government agents arrive to efface them: Izuna sacrifices himself for Yomi, relieving his guilt at allowing her previous deaths. She retreats with her retainers, mired in sorrow and her miasma, despite Kagura's pleas. After resurrecting Izuna with an escort's soul, Yomi arrives at Tokyo's Naraku, releasing all her miasma and disrupting the Reimyaku. Consequently, this gives rise to Immortals and Narakus worldwide. Kagura, Micheal, Kensuke, Tsuina and Shizuru search for Yomi. Following clashes with the Tengu, Okama and a revived Kyūbi, they encounter Yomi and Izuna, now a corrupted soul like herself. During the battle the Black Priestess's Black Kirin (opposing the White Priestess's Byakuei, together they are yin & yang) breaks Byakuei's chains thus tearing apart both Byakuei and Kagura's souls. To save Kagura, Yomi melds with Kagura's soul after comprehending Kagura's devotion to her, as Byakuei dies. Izuna subsequently vanishes. Two years later, after the miasma clears and society rebuilds itself, Yomi, Kyouko, Kensuke, Kagura, and Izuna, a free-floating ghost, continue exorcism duties and live together, per Kensuke's suggestion. Mikado finally proposes to Tsuina.

== Terminology ==
Sesshōseki
A stone made by the crystallization of the Nine-Tailed Fox's spiritual power when it was defeated hundreds of years ago. There are several spread all over the planet. As the power that they are made from is inherently evil, they tend to corrupt their user's minds and consume their bodies and minds, in return for limitless spirit power. Kagura possessed two in her earrings, while Kensuke had one (briefly) buried in his chest, near his heart. Kazuhiro appears to be their "keeper", as he gave one to Yomi and later took it away. They are the reason for Yomi's metamorphosis into an evil spirit and are extremely dangerous.
A person who possesses sesshōseki will have advanced regenerative abilities and may even be able to slow his/her aging, as demonstrated by Kazuhiro.

Shikigami
Paper spirits used by Kyouko and other members of her family. They are made up of fuda, pieces of paper with incantations on them and can be used in several different ways, such as making them into paper giants or barriers.
Hōjitsu
Spells, usually preceded by a lengthy Buddhist chant, that most spirit-users use to create a type of nature-related attack such as a lightning bolt. They are commonly used in conjunction with hand seals.
Jūgondō (呪禁道)
Taoist magic that was developed in the shadow of Onmyou and was later banned. Its practitioners were driven underground and reformed under the guise of a smuggling syndicate. They have since resurfaced. Shizuru and Setsuna are the daughters of the leader of Juugondo.
Naraku
An area of Miasma created from the Kyuubi attack in Tokyo. All living beings within became spirits, though they did not all become evil.
Supernatural Disaster Countermeasures Division (SDCD)
A government agency that fights the supernatural under the command of the Ministry of Environment. Formed after World War II, the agency has experience with fighting the supernatural, thanks to some of its members who are experts in dealing with it. The Division includes members of exorcist families, like Tsuchimiya and Isayama. Despite having hired such talented people into their ranks, the SDCD suffers from low manpower and as such have hired mercenaries or independent exorcists to help them in work especially in tough cases.
Paranormal Disaster Countermeasure Headquarters (PDCH)
A special military unit under the Ministry of Defense. The PDCH was formed to help the SDCD fight against the supernatural yet at the same time prevent the MoE and SDCD from gaining too much power. Unlike the SDCD, the PDCH lack experts who deal with the supernatural, which they make up for it with more manpower and the latest technology in their fights. Due to the actions of Yomi Isayama, the PDCH was almost destroyed and suffered heavy losses in their ranks. It is hinted the PDCH became part of the SDCD when the latter was revived.

== Media ==
=== Manga ===
Ga-Rei was published by Kadokawa Shoten in the shōnen magazine Shōnen Ace and was collected in twelve tankōbon volumes. In addition, a single volume side-story manga titled Ga-Rei: Tsuina no Shō was also published in Shōnen Ace. In Europe, the series was licensed by Pika Édition for France, by Planet Manga for Italy and by Tokyopop for Germany. Kadokawa Shoten has made the digital English version of the manga available on BookWalker.

=== Anime ===
Ga-Rei: Zero is directed by Ei Aoki and animated by AIC Spirits and asread. The show is aired on AT-X, Chiba TV, KBS Kyoto, Sun TV, Tokyo MX TV, TV Aichi, TV Hokkaido, TV Kanagawa, TV Saitama and TVQ Kyushu Broadcasting Co., Ltd.

The adaptation was announced on the promotional sleeve wrapper of Ga-rei's sixth volume regarding the green lighting of the show. A Ga-Rei: Zero television ad was soon aired to promote the show's upcoming release, followed by 30 second commercials that were on the Ga-Rei: Zero websites. Originally, it was announced that the anime would be an original story, suggesting that it had nothing to do with the manga except its setting: however, when the first episode aired, viewers were confused when the entire main cast was suddenly killed off. It was only later revealed in the second episode and still later in a radio interview with cast members Minoru Shiraishi, Kaoru Mizuhara & Minori Chihara, that the anime in fact tells the backstories of Yomi and Kagura before the events of the manga, thus making Ga-Rei: Zero a prequel to the original Ga-Rei series.

Funimation (which later as Crunchyroll, LLC) announced Ga-Rei: Zero's English license in August 2010 and released the series on Blu-ray and DVD in 2011. Funimation will stream the subtitled episodes on their video portal and YouTube channel.

=== Live-action series ===
The Hollywood Reporter wrote in October 2017 that Craig Kyle plans to adapt the manga into a live-action Hollywood TV series.
