= Makoto no Michi =

Japanese new religion

- 真の道
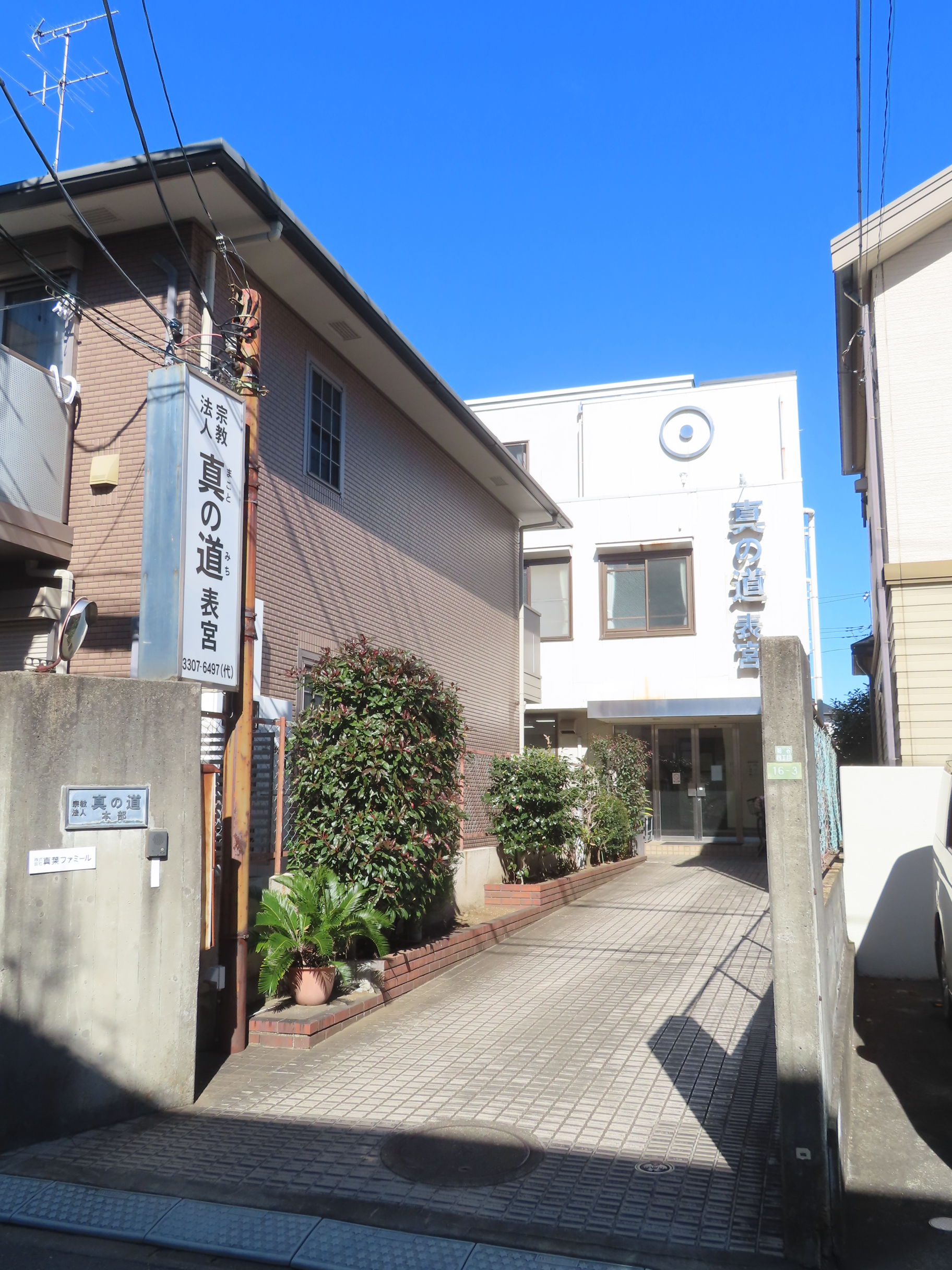
- Makoto no Michi's headquarters
- Scripture: Makoto no Michi shinji (真の道神示) (2 volumes)
- Headquarters: Kasuya, Tokyo
- Founder: Hagiwara Makoto (萩原真)
- Origin: 1949
- Official website: www.makoto.or.jp

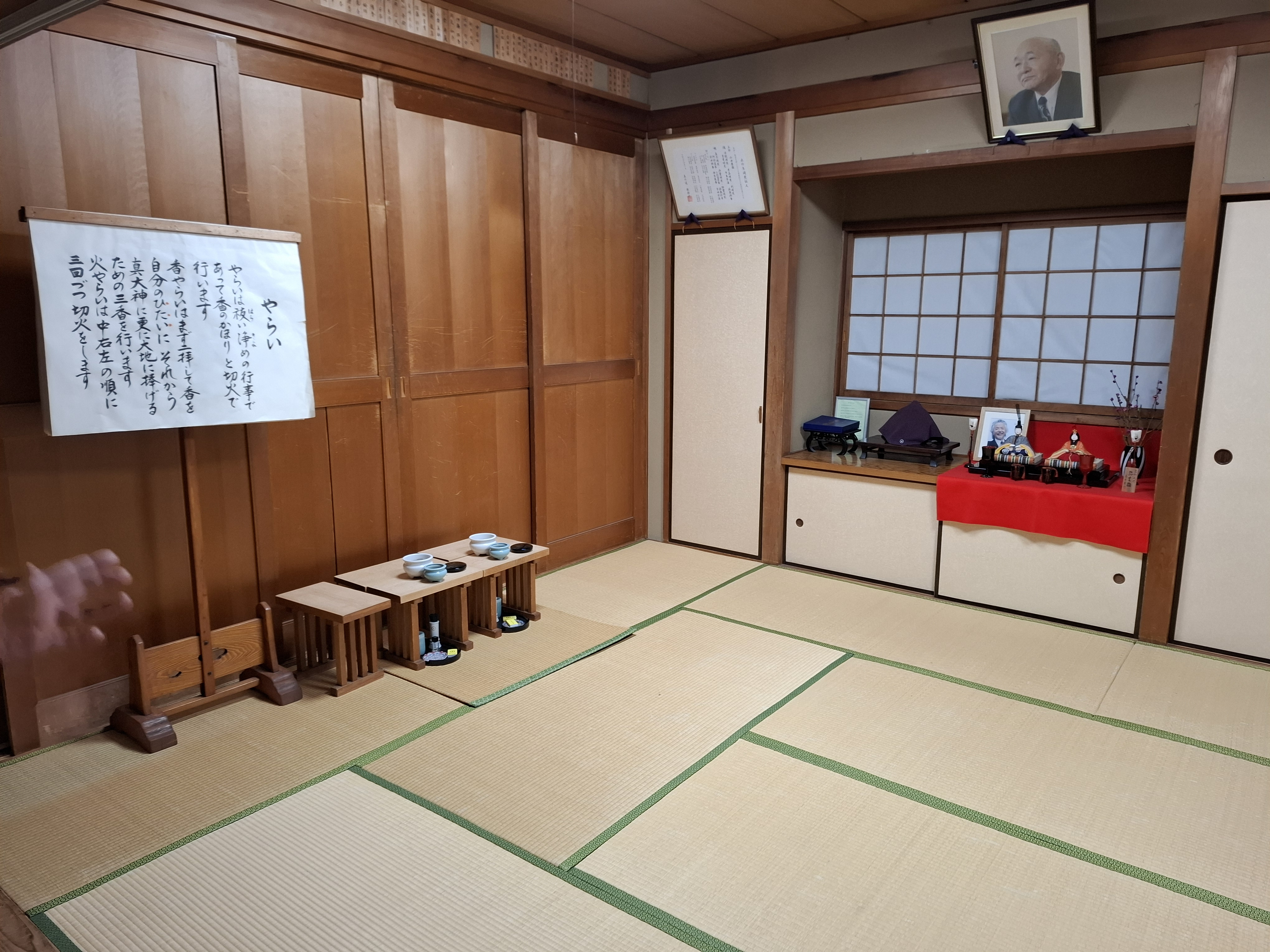
Congregation area on the second floor of Makoto no Michi's headquarters. A portrait of Hagiwara Makoto can be seen on the upper right.

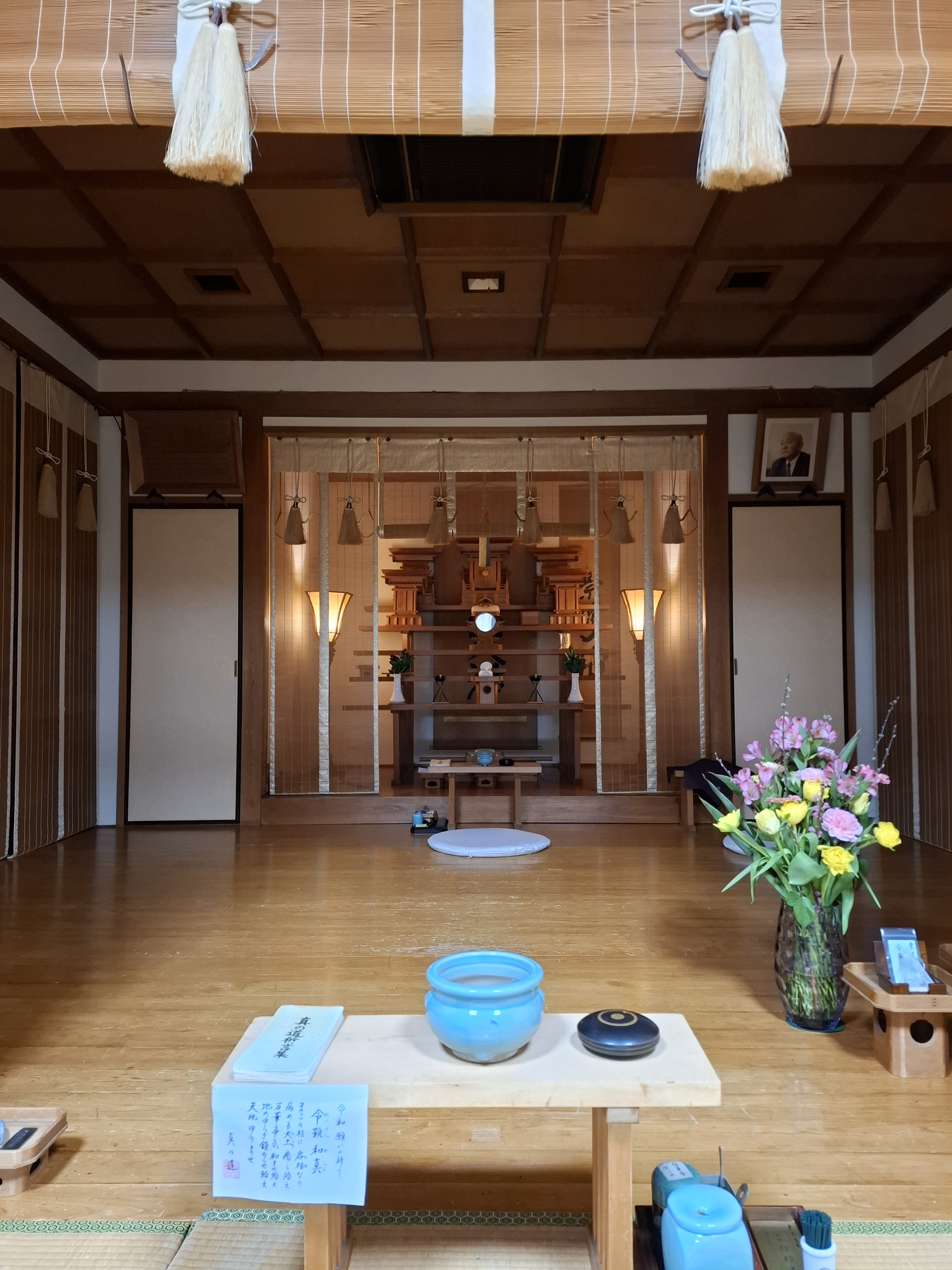
The main altar on the second floor of Makoto no Michi's headquarters, featuring a sacred mirror and other objects. A portrait of Hagiwara Makoto can be seen on the upper right.

Makoto no Michi (真の道) (lit. 'The Sincere Path') is a Shinto-based Japanese new religion. The headquarters of Makoto no Michi is located in Kasuya, Tokyo. Waterfall meditation, which is also a shugendo practice, is one of its main practices.

== History ==
In 1948, the religion was founded as Chidori-kai (千鳥会). Hagiwara Makoto (萩原真, 1910–1981), who had returned from China after World War II, registered it as a religious organization in 1949 and became its leader. In 1952, the organization's name was changed to Makoto no Michi.

One of Hirohito's former aides claimed that Empress Nagako's lady-in-waiting Imaki Yoshiko (今城誼子) was a follower of Makoto no Michi, and that the empress herself may have been influenced by the religion as she was looking for a way to alleviate Hirohito's illness during his later years.

== Spiritual leaders ==
In order of succession, the spiritual leaders (教え主) of Makoto no Michi are:

1. Hagiwara Makoto (萩原真): founder and leader from the religion's founding until his death in 1981
2. Hagiwara Shinmei (萩原真明): son of Hagiwara Makoto and leader from February 1982 to May 2023
3. Nagasawa Meishin (永澤明眞): leader from May 2024 to present

== Beliefs and practices ==
Makoto Ōkami is the central deity of the universe in Makoto no Michi. The religion's official symbol is a circle with a point in the middle.

=== Divine revelations ===
Makoto no Michi practices the receiving of divine revelations (神示, shinji) (お伝え), in which a spirit medium (神伝え人) under divine possession works together with a spirit mediator known as a saniwa (審神者) (サニワ), along with various ritual assistants (see also chinkon kishin).

=== Geography ===
Makoto no Michi's sacred geography is derived from that of Oomoto founder Onisaburo Deguchi's Reikai Monogatari, in which Japan is viewed as a model (雛形, hinagata) or microcosm of the world. Hokkaido is viewed as the equivalent of North America, Honshu as Eurasia, Shikoku as Australia, Kyushu as Africa, and Taiwan as South America; these equivalences stem from their common mythical origins during the creation of the world. The geographic equivalents of the main Japanese islands and Taiwan with the world's continents are identical in both Oomoto and Makoto no Michi. For comparison, Oomoto's headquarters in Ayabe has a garden with islands that represent the same set of islands and continents; the garden is centered around an artificial lake called Kinryūkai (金竜海) (lit. 'Golden Dragon Sea')..

For mountains and lakes, equivalents include:

- Hokkaido – North America
  - Daisetsuzan – Rocky Mountains
- Honshu – Eurasia
  - Lake Towada – Lake Baikal
  - Mount Gassan – Central Siberian Plateau
  - Lake Suwa – Lake Manasarovar / Mount Kailash
  - Mount Kisokoma – Mount Sinai
  - Mount Fuji – Himalayas / Mount Everest
- Shikoku – Australia
  - Mount Tsurugi – Uluru
- Kyushu – Africa
  - Mount Aso – Kilimanjaro
- Taiwan – South America
  - Yu Shan – Aconcagua

== Locations ==
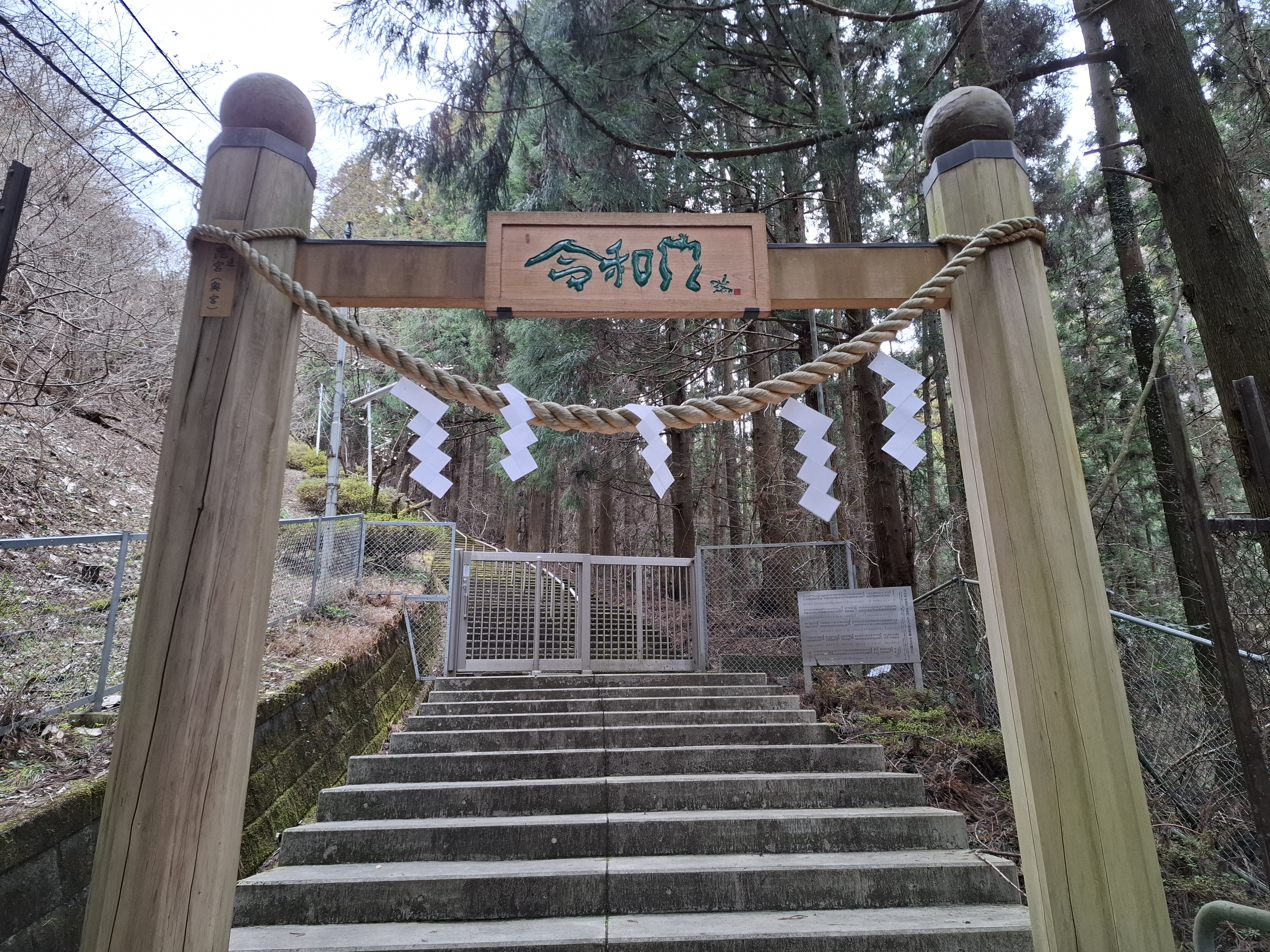
Entrance to a Makoto no Michi shrine at the eastern foot of Mount Takao

Makoto no Michi's administrative headquarters is in Kasuya, Tokyo. The headquarters is also known as Omote-miya (表宮, "Main Temple") or Aratama-no-miya (荒魂宮). The religion also has a waterfall meditation site at Nigitama-no-miya (和魂宮; also called Tsuki-miya 月宮) just north of the summit of Mount Takao. Makoto no Michi's "inner temple" (Oku-miya 奥宮) is Naohi-no-miya (直毘宮), located in Nasu, Tochigi. Makoto no Michi also has members in Italy.

Makoto no Michi has the following branch locations (支部, shibu).

Branch name	Location
Tokyo 東京支部（表宮）	Setagaya, Tokyo
Chiba 千葉支部	Chiba
Yokohama 横浜支部	Yokohama
Iwaki いわき支部	Iwaki
Aizu 会津支部	Shōwa, Fukushima
Osaka 大阪支部（涛華宮）	Osaka
Maizuru 舞鶴支部	Maizuru, Kyoto
Yura 由良支部	Yura, Wakayama
Nagoya 名古屋支部（中京宮）	Tajimi, Gifu
Kyushu 九州支部（津久志宮）	Fukuoka
Iizuka 飯塚支部	Iizuka, Fukuoka
Fukuoka Minami 福岡南支部	Yame, Fukuoka
Italy イタリア支部	Rome

=== Italy ===
The history of Makoto no Michi in Italy dates back to the early 1990s. Kurihara Koshi, a Makoto no Michi member who was born in Ibaraki Prefecture in 1957, introduced Makoto no Michi to Italy in 1990. He settled in Italy and taught aikido (合気道) there. Later in 1996, Koshi started his own aikido-derived martial art called shinkido (神気道) in Rome. During the early 1990s, waterfall misogi rituals were performed at Sassinoro, Monte Pollino, and Zompo lo Schioppo. The I-no-miya Dōjō (伊宮道場, "Italy-miya Dōjō") was inaugurated in Rome in 1996, and the Tempio della Luna (Japanese: Tsuki-miya 月宮, "Temple of the Moon") was inaugurated in Assisi in 2002. As of 2024, there are approximately 100 Makoto no Michi members in Italy.

== Books ==
Makoto no Michi has published about a dozen books, a few of which include:

- Makoto no Michi shinji / 真の道神示 (1972)
- Makoto no Michi shinji: vol. 2 / 真の道神示 第二集 (2000)

Other books include:

- 真を求めて:萩原真自伝
- 飛翔:萩原真先生を偲ぶ
- 大峰老仙:わしはピヨピヨじゃったよ
- 守護霊様と私（第二集）
- 真手入門
- 天源
- 車に乗った巫女

Books in the Makoto no Michi o motomete (まことの道を求めて) series:

1. 天命が見える
2. 梶さんの霊界通信
3. 人間の幸福

Italian books include:

- Yuniwa (1996) (magazine)
- Il Misoghi del Cuore (2003)
- Il Cuore del Misoghi (2003)
- Il Nostro Cammino (2005)
- Il Nostro Cammino 2006-2008 (2008)
