= Nasu Imperial Villa =

Japanese imperial villa

Coordinates: 37°05′16.7″N 140°01′25.2″E

Nasu Imperial Villa, located in the town of Nasu, Nasu District in Tochigi Prefecture, is a retreat used by the Japanese Imperial Family. The structure dates to 1926, a further addition came in 1935.

The Imperial Family normally stays in the villa during the months of August and September. On May 22, 2011, approximately half of the grounds of the villa were opened to the public as the Nasu Heisei no Mori Park.
