= Toyohara Station =

Railway station in Nasu, Tochigi Prefecture, Japan

Toyohara Station 豊原駅
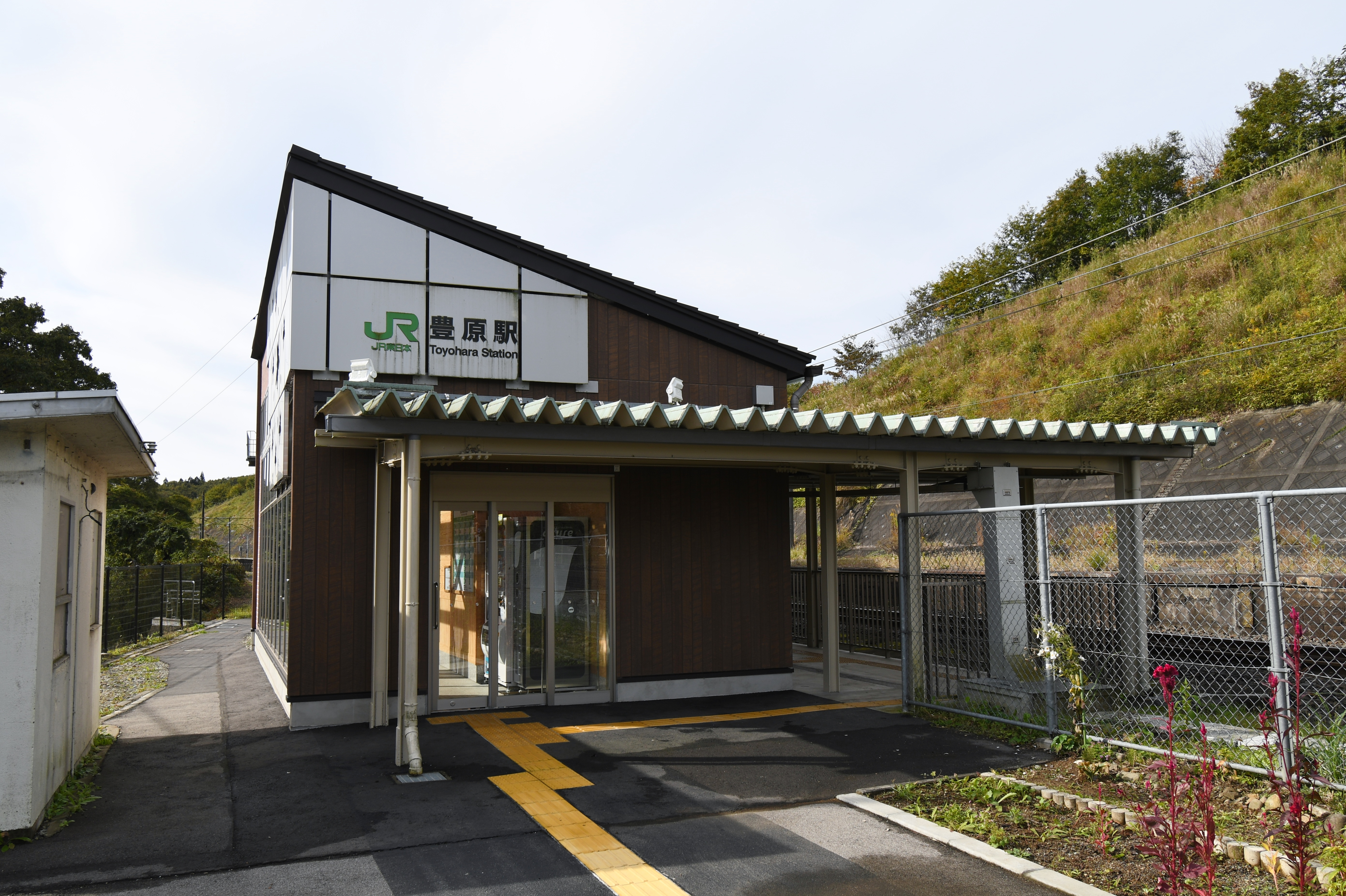
- Toyohara Station, October 2021

General information
- Location: Toyoharako, Nasu-machi, Nasu-gun, Tochigi-ken 329-3211; Japan
- Coordinates: 37.0553°N 140.1550°E
- Operator: JR East
- Line: ■ Tōhoku Main Line
- Distance: 176.7 km from Tokyo
- Platforms: 2 side platforms

Other information
- Status: Unstaffed
- Website: Official website

History
- Opened: July 16, 1887

Passengers
- FY2008: 55 daily

Services
Preceding station	JR East	Following station
Kurodahara towards Kuroiso	Tōhoku Main Line Local	Shirasaka towards Morioka
Location
- Location within Tochigi Prefecture Location within Japan

Toyohara Station (豊原駅, Toyohara-eki) is a railway station in the town of Nasu, Tochigi Prefecture, Japan, operated by the East Japan Railway Company (JR East).

== Lines ==
Toyohara Station is served by the Tōhoku Main Line, and is located 176.7 kilometers from the official starting point of the line at Tokyo Station.

== Station layout ==
Toyohara Station has two opposed side platforms connected to the station building by a footbridge. The station is unattended.

=== Platforms ===
1	■ Tohoku Main Line	for Kuroiso and Utsunomiya
2	■ Tohoku Main Line	for Shirakawa and Kōriyama

== History ==
Toyohara Station opened on July 16, 1887. It was renamed Shimotsuke Toyohara Station (下野豊原駅) on April 1, 1925, but reverted to its original name on August 1, 1948. The station was absorbed into the JR East network upon the privatization of Japanese National Railways (JNR) on April 1, 1987.

== Surrounding area ==
The station is located in an isolated mountainous area, with few buildings in the vicinity.

- National Route 294

== See also ==
- List of railway stations in Japan
