= Takaku Station =

Railway station in Nasu, Tochigi Prefecture, Japan

Takaku Station 高久駅
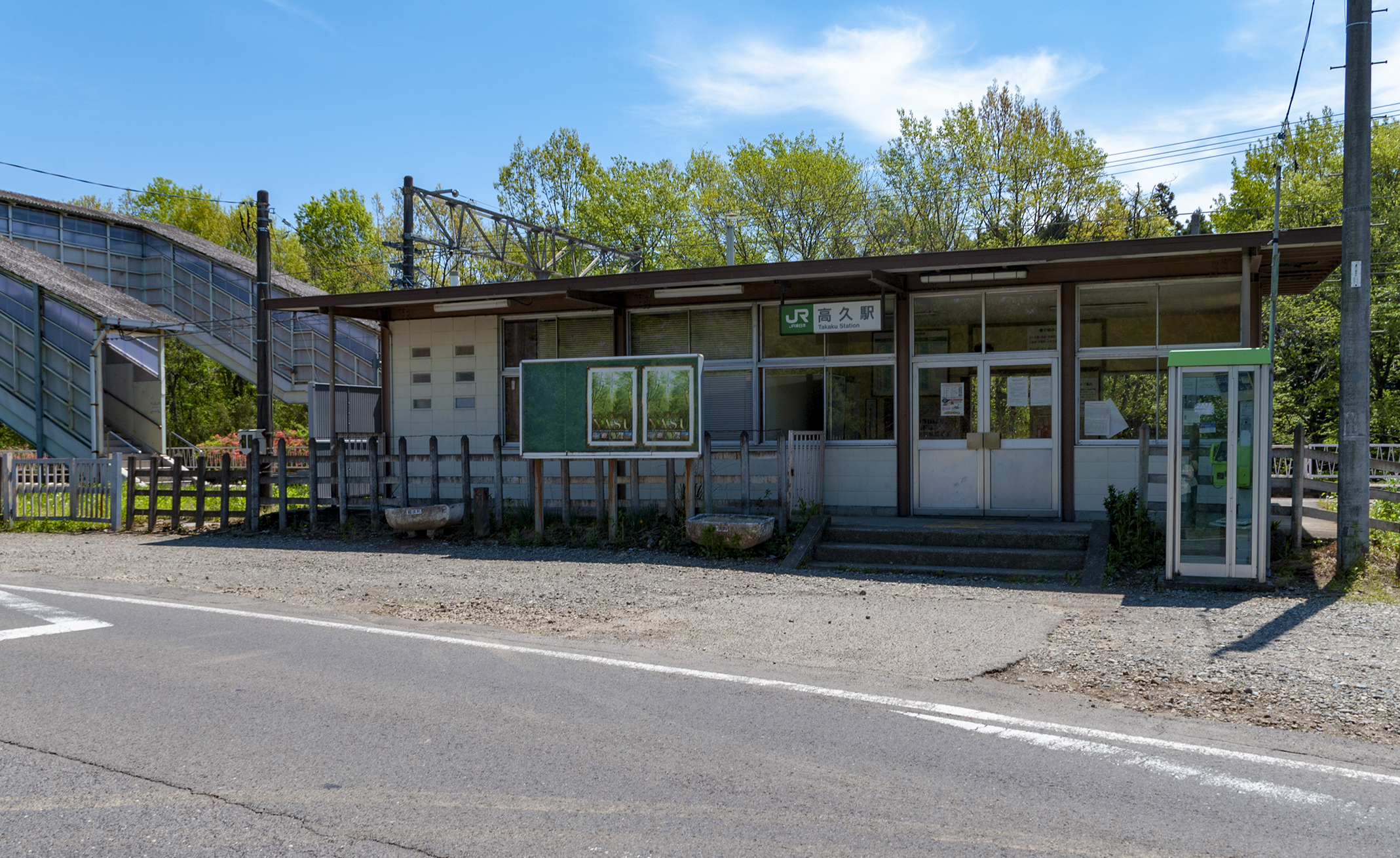
- Takaku Station, May 2011

General information
- Location: Takaku Nishikubo 720-4, Nasu-machi, Nasu-gun, Tochigi-ken 325-0001; Japan
- Coordinates: 36.9964°N 140.0876°E
- Operator: JR East
- Line: ■ Tōhoku Main Line
- Distance: 167.3 km from Tokyo
- Platforms: 2 side platforms

Other information
- Status: Unstaffed
- Website: Official website

History
- Opened: September 1, 1964

Passengers
- FY2011: 38 daily

Services
Preceding station	JR East	Following station
Kuroiso Terminus	Tōhoku Main Line Local	Kurodahara towards Morioka
Location
- Location within Tochigi Prefecture Location within Japan

Takaku Station (高久駅, Takaku-eki) is a railway station in the town of Nasu, Tochigi Prefecture, Japan, operated by the East Japan Railway Company (JR East).

== Lines ==
Takaku Station is served by the Tōhoku Main Line, and is located 167.3 rail kilometers from the official starting point of the line at Tokyo Station.

== Station layout ==
Takaku Station has two opposed side platforms connected to the station building by a footbridge. The station is unattended.

=== Platforms ===
1	■ Tōhoku Main Line	for Shirakawa and Kōriyama
2	■ Tōhoku Main Line	for Kuroiso and Utsunomiya

== History ==
Takaku Station opened on September 1, 1964. The station was absorbed into the JR East network upon the privatization of the Japanese National Railways (JNR) on April 1, 1987.

== Surrounding area ==
- Nasukogen Hospital
