= Tamamo-no-Mae =

Legendary figure in Japanese mythology

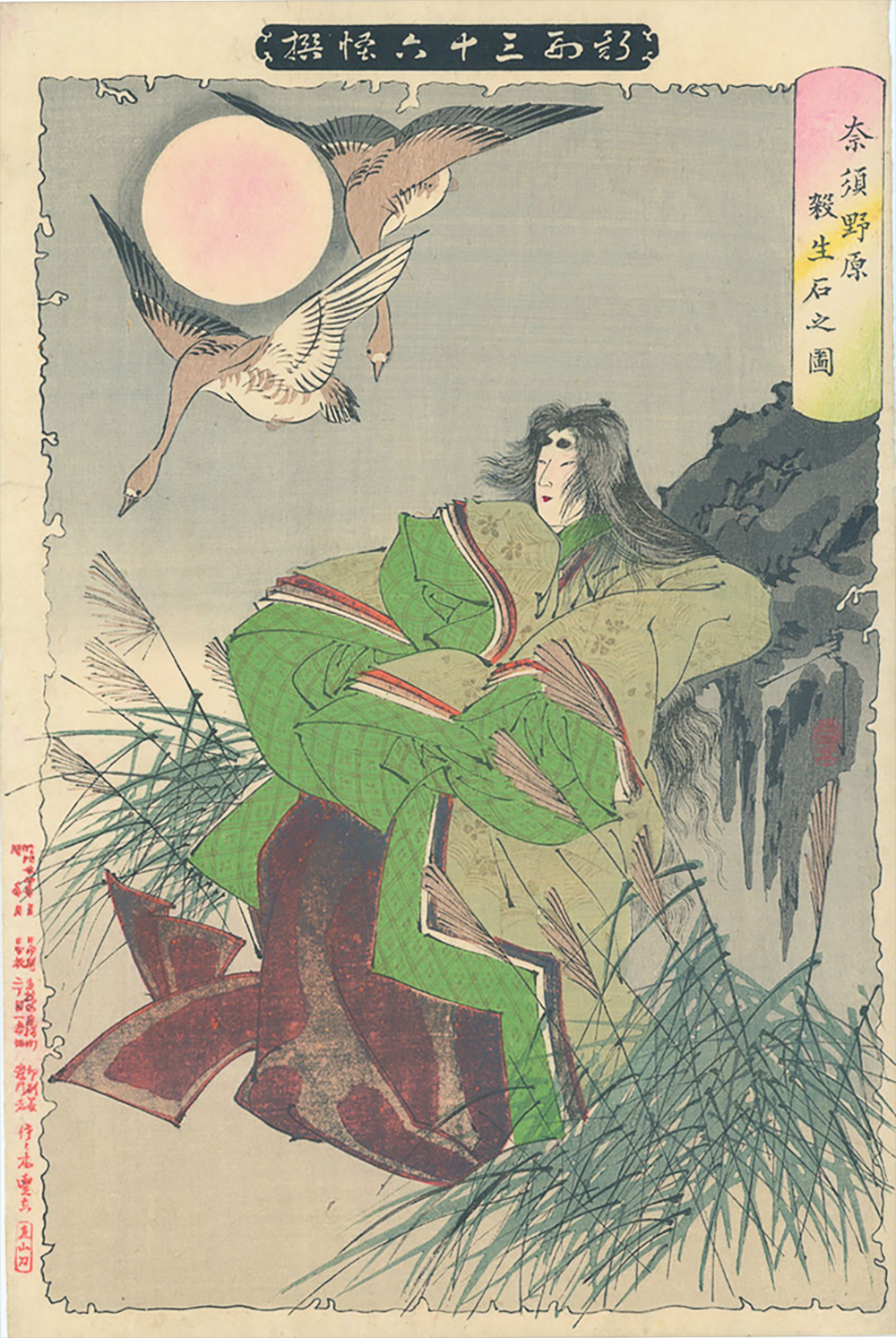
Tamamo-no-Mae Woodblock print by Tsukioka Yoshitoshi

Tamamo-no-Mae (玉藻前, 玉藻の前, also 玉藻御前) is a legendary figure in Japanese mythology. One of the stories explaining the legend comes from Muromachi period (1336 to 1573) genre fiction called otogizōshi. In the otogizōshi, Tamamo-no-Mae was a courtesan under the Japanese Emperor Konoe (who reigned from 1142 through 1155).

== Legends ==
Stories of Tamamo-no-Mae being a legendary kitsune fox spirit appear during the Muromachi period as otogizōshi (prose narratives), and were also mentioned by Toriyama Sekien in Konjaku Hyakki Shūi. Edo period folklore then conflated the legend with similar foreign stories about fox spirits corrupting rulers, causing chaos in their territories.

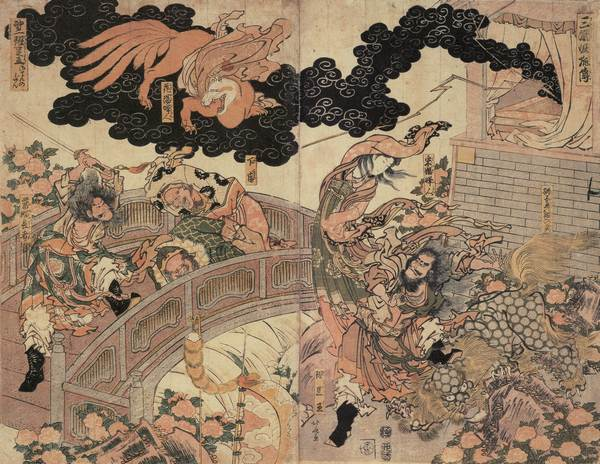
Fleeing fox spirit as Lady Kayō depicted in Hokusai's Sangoku Yōko-den (三国妖狐伝)

In the story told by Hokusai, formed in the Edo period, the nine-tailed fox first appeared in China and possessed Daji, a concubine of the Shang dynasty's last ruler King Zhou. She enchanted the king and brought on a reign of terror that led to a rebellion that ended the Shang dynasty. The fox spirit fled to Magadha of Tianzhu (ancient India) and became Lady Kayō (華陽夫人), concubine of the crown prince Banzoku (班足太子; based on Indian tales of Kalmashapada the man-eater), causing him to cut off the heads of a thousand men. It was then defeated again, and fled the country. The same fox returned to China around 780 BC and was said to have possessed Bao Si, a concubine of the Zhou dynasty King You. It was again chased away by human military forces.

The fox stayed quiet for some time. Then she appeared in Japan as Tamamo-no-Mae, the most favoured courtesan of Emperor Konoe. She was said to be a most beautiful and intelligent woman, being able to answer any question asked. She caused the Emperor to be extremely ill and was eventually exposed as a fox spirit by the astrologer Abe no Yasuchika, who had been called to diagnose the cause of the Emperor's poor health. A few years later, the emperor sent Kazusa-no-suke (上総介) and Miura-no-suke (三浦介) to kill the fox in the plains of Nasu.

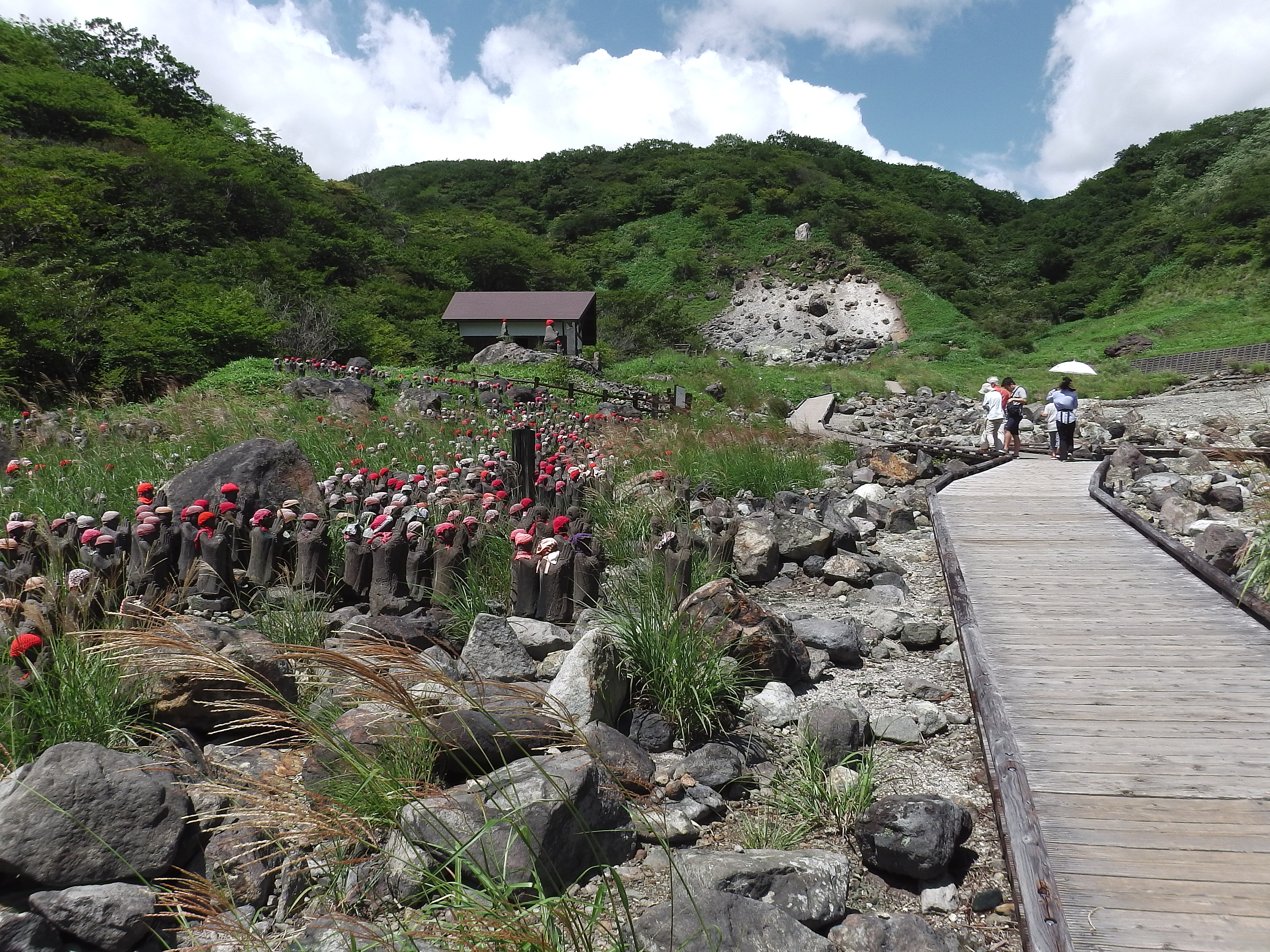
Sessho-seki (Killing Stone) and Thousand Jizō Statues

In the 1653 Tamamo no sōshi (玉藻の草紙), an addendum was added to the story describing that the spirit of Tamamo-no-mae embedded itself into a stone called the Sesshō-seki. The stone continually released poisonous gas, killing everything that touched it. The stone was said to have been destroyed in the Nanboku-chō period by the Buddhist monk Gennō Shinshō (源翁心昭), who exorcised the now-repentant fox spirit. He held a Buddhist memorial service after the deed, allowing the spirit to finally rest in peace.

The stone split in two on March 5, 2022. Cracks in the stone had been seen several years before the split, possibly allowing rainwater to penetrate and weaken it, so it is highly likely that the stone cracked naturally. Some humorously speculated that this had freed Tamamo-no-Mae, and social media in Japan predicted that dark forces had been released.
