= Kurodahara Station =

Railway station in Nasu, Tochigi Prefecture, Japan

Kurodahara Station 黒田原駅
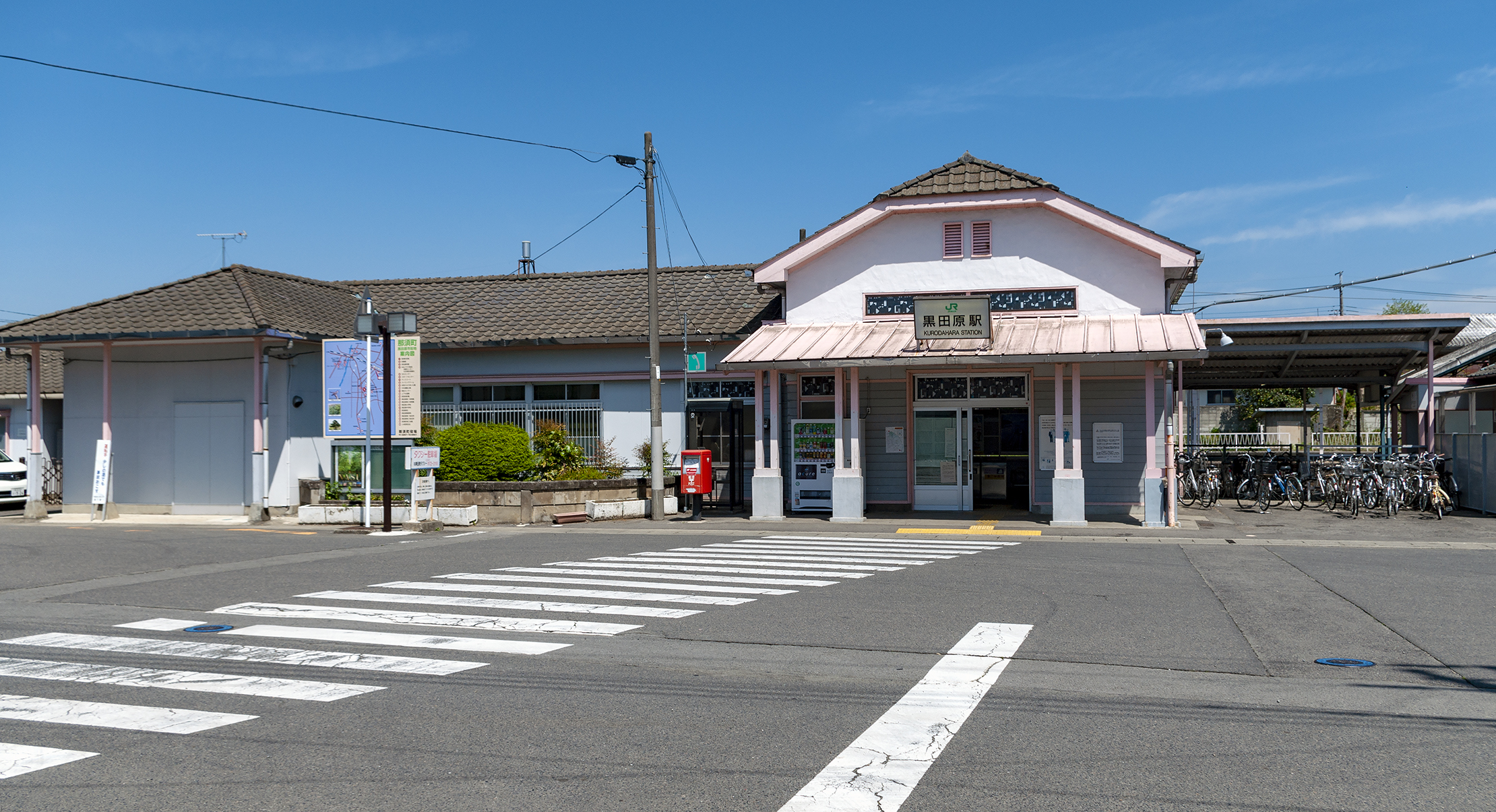
- Kurodahara Station, May 2011

General information
- Location: Terakohei 2, Nasu-machi, Nasu-gun, Tochigi-ken 329-3222; Japan
- Coordinates: 37.0227°N 140.1196°E
- Operator: JR East
- Line: ■ Tōhoku Main Line
- Distance: 171.5 km from Tokyo
- Platforms: 2 side platforms
- Connections: Bus stop

Other information
- Status: Staffed
- Website: Official website

History
- Opened: September 1, 1891

Passengers
- FY2019: 440 daily

Services
Preceding station	JR East	Following station
Takaku towards Kuroiso	Tōhoku Main Line Local	Toyohara towards Morioka
Location
- Location within Tochigi Prefecture Location within Japan

Kurodahara Station (黒田原駅, Kurodahara-eki) is a railway station in the town of Nasu, Tochigi Prefecture, Japan, operated by the East Japan Railway Company (JR East).

== Lines ==
Kurodahara Station is served by the Tōhoku Main Line, and is located 171.5 rail kilometers from the official starting point of the line at Tokyo Station.

== Station layout ==
Kurodahara Station has two opposed side platforms connected to the station building by a footbridge. The station is staffed.

=== Platforms ===
1	■ Tōhoku Main Line	for Kuroiso and Utsunomiya
2	■ Tōhoku Main Line	for Shirakawa and Kōriyama

== History ==
Kurodahara Station opened on September 1, 1891. The station was absorbed into the JR East network upon the privatization of the Japanese National Railways (JNR) on April 1, 1987.

== Passenger statistics ==
In fiscal 2019, the station was used by an average of 440 passengers daily (boarding passengers only).

== Surrounding area ==
- Nasu Town Hall
- Kurodahara Post Office
- Kurodahara Jinja
