= Kasuya (surname) =

Kasuya (written: 粕谷 or 糟屋) is a Japanese surname. Notable people with the surname include:

- Isamu Kasuya, Japanese motorcycle racer
- Kyoko Kasuya (粕谷 恭子) (born 1975), Japanese swimmer
- Shunji Kasuya (born 1962), Japanese racing driver
- Kasuya Takenori (糟屋 武則) (1562–1607), Japanese samurai
