= Nasu, Tochigi =

Nasu 那須町
- Town
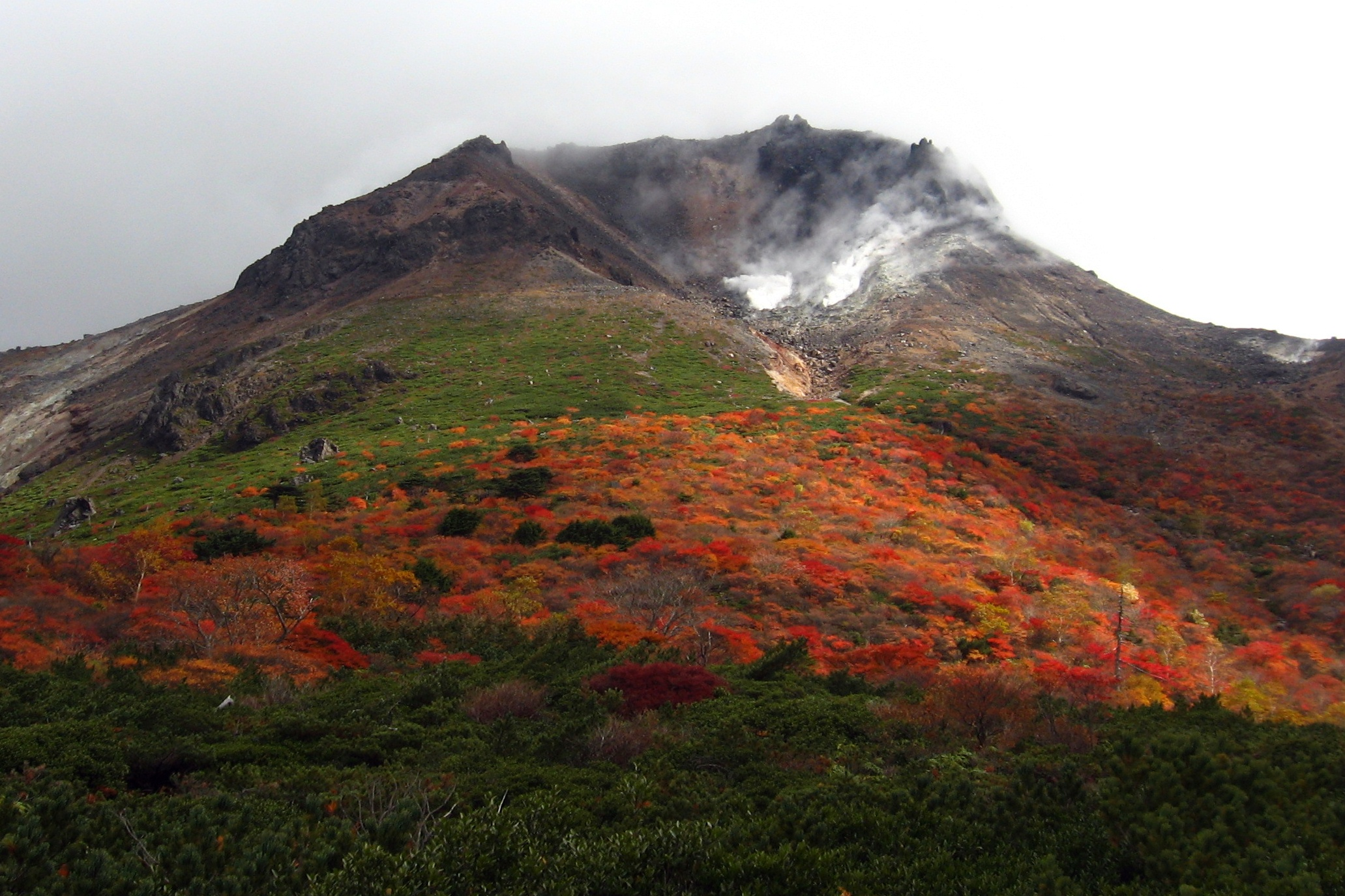
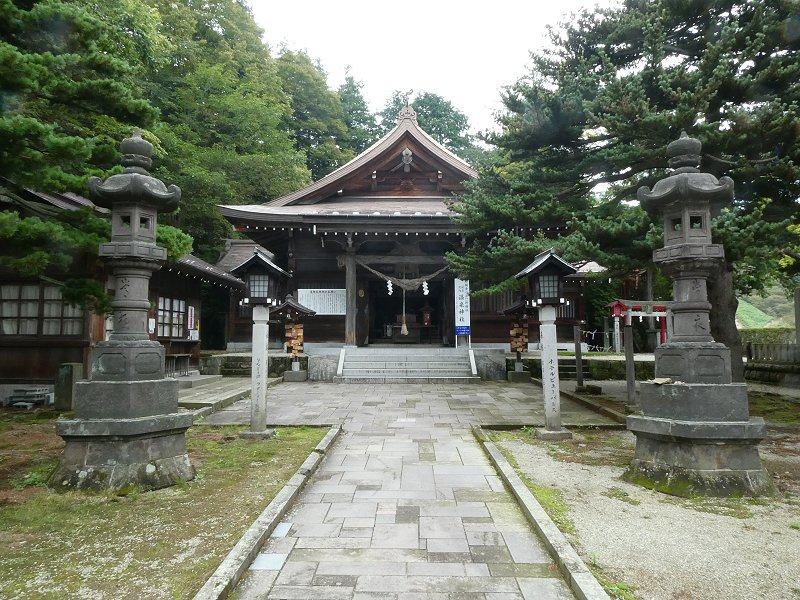
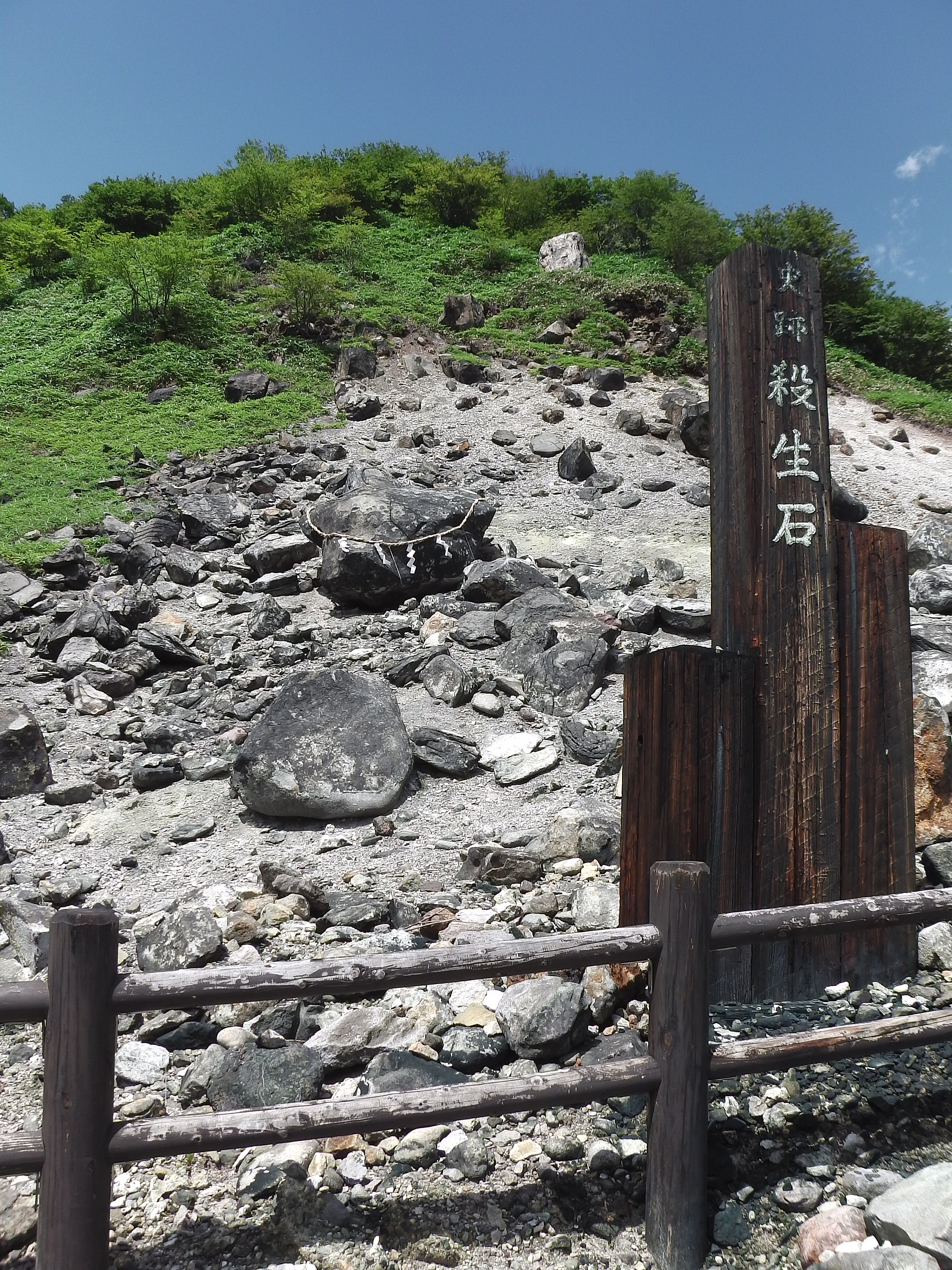
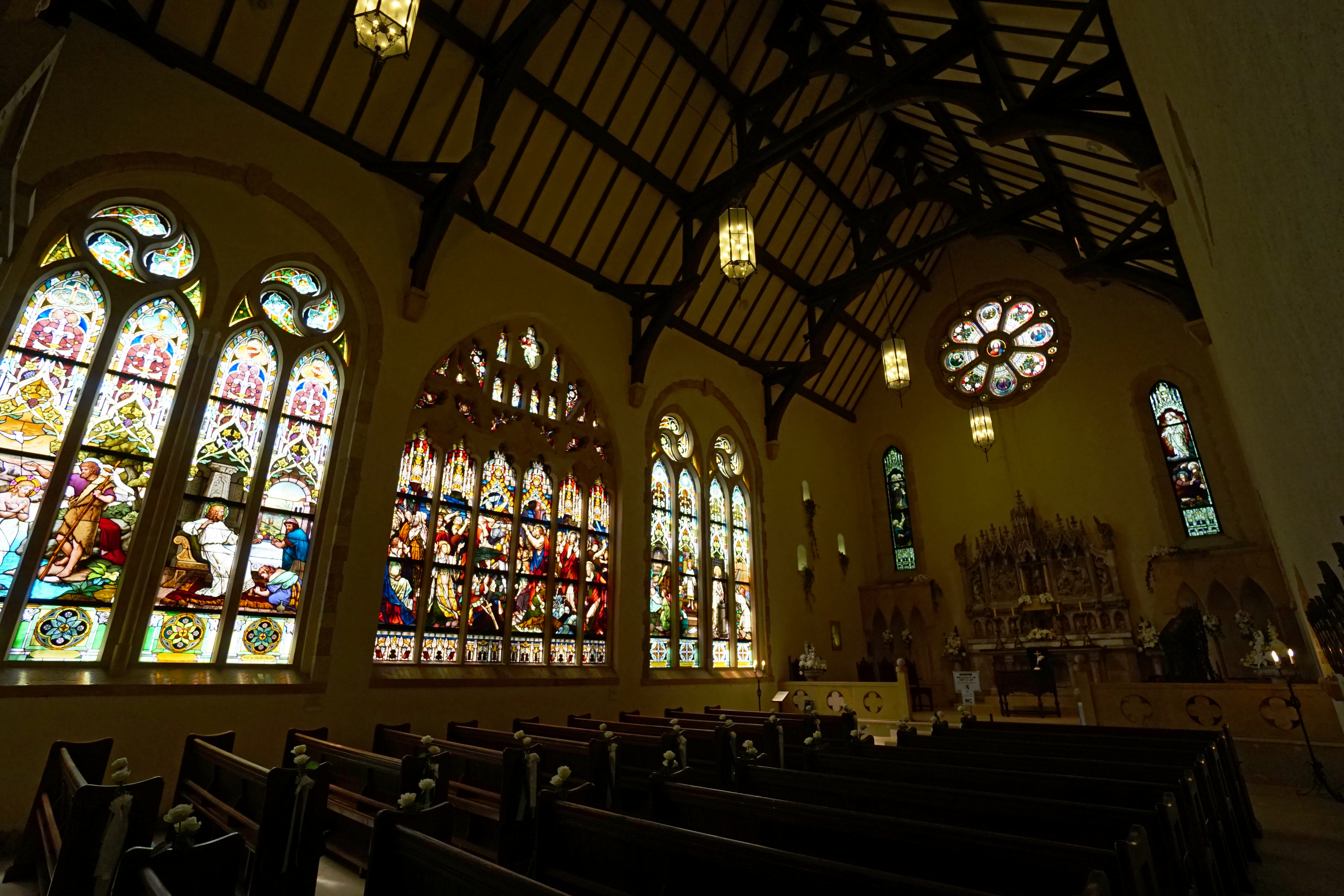
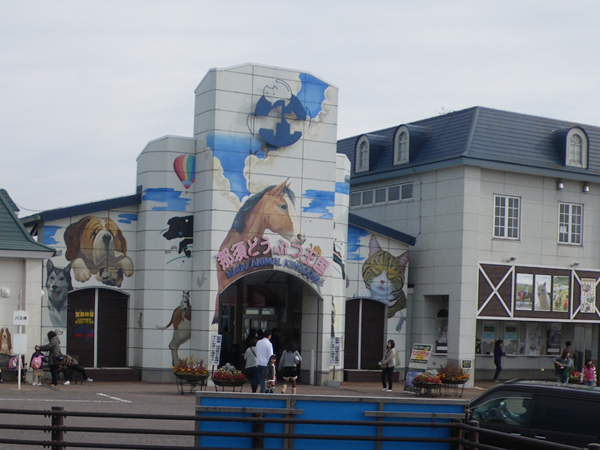
- From top, left to right: Chausudake volcano, Nasu Yuzen-jinja, Sessho-seki, Nasu Stained Glass Museum, Nasu Animal Kingdom

- Flag Seal

- Location of Nasu in Tochigi Prefecture

- Coordinates: 37°01′11.1″N 140°07′15.5″E
- Country: Japan
- Region: Kantō
- Prefecture: Tochigi Prefecture
- District: Nasu

Area
  - Total: 372.34 km^{2} (143.76 sq mi)

Population (August 2020)
  - Total: 24,851
  - Density: 66.743/km^{2} (172.86/sq mi)
- Time zone: UTC+9 (Japan Standard Time)
- Phone number: 0287-72-6901
- Address: 3-13 Terakohei, Nasu-machi, Nasu-gun, Tochigi-ken 329-3222
- Climate: Dfb
- Website: Official website
- Symbols
- Bird: Common cuckoo
- Flower: Gentian
- Tree: Pine

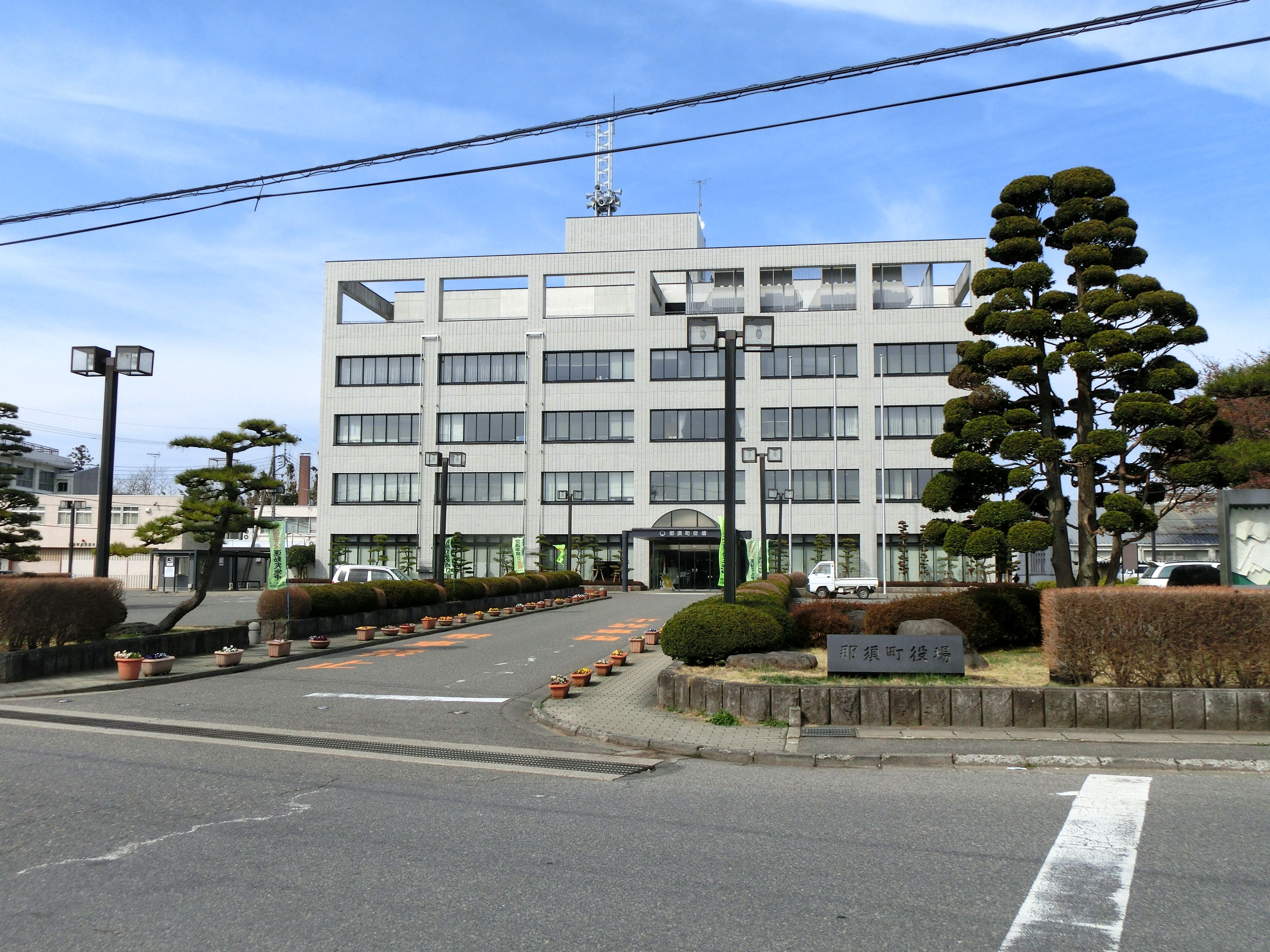
Nasu town office

Nasu (那須町, Nasu-machi; Japanese pronunciation: [nä̀.sɨ́, nä́.sɨ̀]) is a town located in Tochigi Prefecture, Japan. As of 1 August 2020, the town had an estimated population of 24,851 in 10,400 households, and a population density of 67 persons per km^{2} (174 per sq. mi.). The total area of the town is 372.34 square kilometres (143.76 sq mi).

== Geography ==
Nasu is located in the mountainous far northeast of Tochigi Prefecture. The Naka River runs through the southwestern portion of the town and the Kurokawa River through the northeast.

=== Surrounding municipalities ===
Fukushima Prefecture

- Nishigō
- Shirakawa
- Tanagura

Tochigi Prefecture

- Nasushiobara
- Ōtawara

=== Demographics ===
Per Japanese census data, the population of Nasu has declined slowly over the past 70 years, with a small uptick around the year 2000.

Historical population
Year	Pop.	±%
1920	20,064	—
1930	22,216	+10.7%
1940	23,069	+3.8%
1950	31,241	+35.4%
1960	30,359	−2.8%
1970	28,121	−7.4%
1980	26,824	−4.6%
1990	26,670	−0.6%
2000	27,027	+1.3%
2010	26,754	−1.0%
2020	23,956	−10.5%

== Climate ==
Nasu has a humid continental climate (Köppen Dfb) characterized by warm summers and cold winters with heavy snowfall. The average annual temperature in Nasu is 9.5 °C (49.1 °F). The average annual rainfall is 2,014.7 mm (79.32 in) with July as the wettest month. The temperatures are highest on average in August, at around 21.0 °C (69.8 °F), and lowest in January, at around −1.7 °C (28.9 °F).

Climate data for Nasu Kōgen, Nasu (1991–2020 normals, extremes 1977–present)
Month	Jan	Feb	Mar	Apr	May	Jun	Jul	Aug	Sep	Oct	Nov	Dec	Year
Record high °C (°F)	12.7 (54.9)	16.8 (62.2)	21.1 (70.0)	26.8 (80.2)	29.6 (85.3)	31.1 (88.0)	33.2 (91.8)	32.2 (90.0)	30.5 (86.9)	25.6 (78.1)	21.0 (69.8)	17.4 (63.3)	33.2 (91.8)
Mean daily maximum °C (°F)	1.9 (35.4)	2.7 (36.9)	6.8 (44.2)	13.0 (55.4)	18.2 (64.8)	20.7 (69.3)	24.3 (75.7)	25.4 (77.7)	21.4 (70.5)	16.1 (61.0)	10.9 (51.6)	5.1 (41.2)	13.9 (57.0)
Daily mean °C (°F)	−1.7 (28.9)	−1.3 (29.7)	2.0 (35.6)	7.8 (46.0)	13.0 (55.4)	16.4 (61.5)	20.2 (68.4)	21.0 (69.8)	17.3 (63.1)	11.8 (53.2)	6.4 (43.5)	1.1 (34.0)	9.5 (49.1)
Mean daily minimum °C (°F)	−5.3 (22.5)	−5.3 (22.5)	−2.4 (27.7)	2.6 (36.7)	7.7 (45.9)	12.3 (54.1)	16.7 (62.1)	17.5 (63.5)	13.8 (56.8)	7.7 (45.9)	2.0 (35.6)	−2.6 (27.3)	5.4 (41.7)
Record low °C (°F)	−11.8 (10.8)	−12.1 (10.2)	−10.4 (13.3)	−6.0 (21.2)	−2.3 (27.9)	3.6 (38.5)	8.7 (47.7)	8.9 (48.0)	3.2 (37.8)	−1.2 (29.8)	−6.1 (21.0)	−10.2 (13.6)	−12.1 (10.2)
Average precipitation mm (inches)	52.6 (2.07)	42.8 (1.69)	101.6 (4.00)	139.6 (5.50)	180.8 (7.12)	220.5 (8.68)	305.7 (12.04)	303.9 (11.96)	305.3 (12.02)	212.6 (8.37)	89.2 (3.51)	60.1 (2.37)	2,014.7 (79.32)
Average snowfall cm (inches)	103 (41)	79 (31)	45 (18)	7 (2.8)	0 (0)	0 (0)	0 (0)	0 (0)	0 (0)	0 (0)	4 (1.6)	55 (22)	296 (117)
Average precipitation days (≥ 1.0 mm)	9.1	8.3	10.4	11.3	12.1	15.9	18.3	17.0	14.8	11.5	8.3	9.1	146.0
Mean monthly sunshine hours	131.0	129.0	156.4	170.4	169.1	108.8	98.7	115.3	98.9	115.1	130.1	132.6	1,555.2
Mean daily sunshine hours	4.2	4.6	5.0	5.7	5.5	3.6	3.2	3.7	3.3	3.7	4.3	4.3	4.3
Source: Japan Meteorological Agency (1991–2020 normals, extremes 1977–present)

== History ==
Nasu and Iouno villages and Ashino Town were created within Nasu District on April 1, 1889 with the creation of the modern municipalities system. The three municipalities merged to form Nasu Town on November 3, 1954.

Nasu Imperial Villa was built in 1926.

In March 2017 an avalanche killed 8 people.

== Government ==
Nasu has a mayor-council form of government with a directly elected mayor and a unicameral town council of 13 members. Nasu, together with the city of Nasushiobara collectively contributes four members to the Tochigi Prefectural Assembly. In terms of national politics, the town is part of Tochigi 3rd district of the lower house of the Diet of Japan.

== Economy ==
The economy of Nasu is heavily dependent on tourism from its numerous hot spring and ski resorts.

== Education ==
Nasu has six public primary schools and two public middle schools operated by the town government. The town has one public high school operated by the Tochigi Prefectural Board of Education. There is also one private school including junior and high school.

== Transportation ==
=== Railway ===
JR East – Tōhoku Main Line (Utsunomiya Line)

- Takaku - Kurodahara - Toyohara

=== Highway ===
- Tōhoku Expressway – Nasu Interchange, Nasu Kogen Service Area and Smart Interchange
- National Route 4
- National Route 294

== Local attractions ==
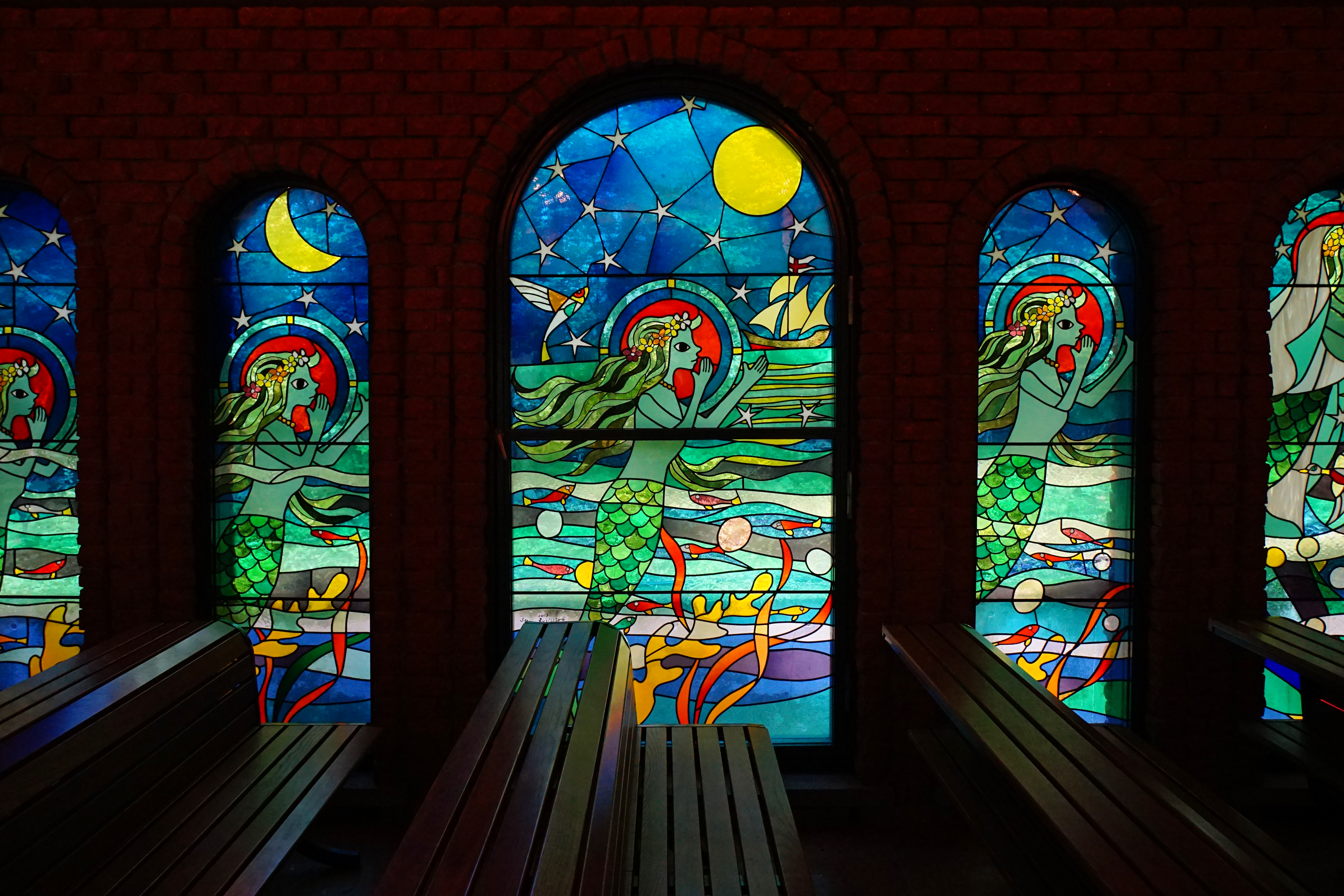
Seiji Fujishiro Museum Nasu

- Ashio Onsen
- Cannabis Museum
- Mount Jeans Nasu Ski Resort, a ski resort to the far north of Nasu
- Naohi-no-miya (直毘宮), Makoto no Michi's "inner temple" (Okumiya 奥宮)
- Mount Nasu
- Nasu Animal Kingdom
- Nasu Highland (那須高原, Nasu kōgen)
- Nasu History Museum (Designed by Kengo Kuma)
- Nasu Imperial Villa
- Nasu Onsen, the collective name given to the various hot springs in the Nasu area surrounding Mt. Chausu. The eight hot springs in this area with accommodation and bathing facilities are sometimes referred to as Nasu Hachiyu (那須八湯) (Shika no yu (鹿の湯), sandogoya onsen (三斗小屋温泉), ōmaru onsen (大丸温泉), kita onsen (北温泉), benten onsen (弁天温泉), takao onsen (高雄温泉), yahata onsen (八幡温泉), shin nasu onsen (新那須温泉))
- Nasu Rindō-ko Lake View (那須りんどう湖レイクビュー, Nasu rindō-ko reiku byū), an amusement facility based around the rindō lake, with activities such as a zip-line, boat ride, go-karts, and more.
- Ōkanmichi (おうかんみち) headquarters, the main facility for a Tenrikyo-derived Japanese new religion
- Sessho-seki
- STONE PLAZA (Designed by Kengo Kuma)
