= Sessho-seki =

Mythological stone in Tochigi, Japan

Coordinates: 37.1016692°N 139.9985806°E

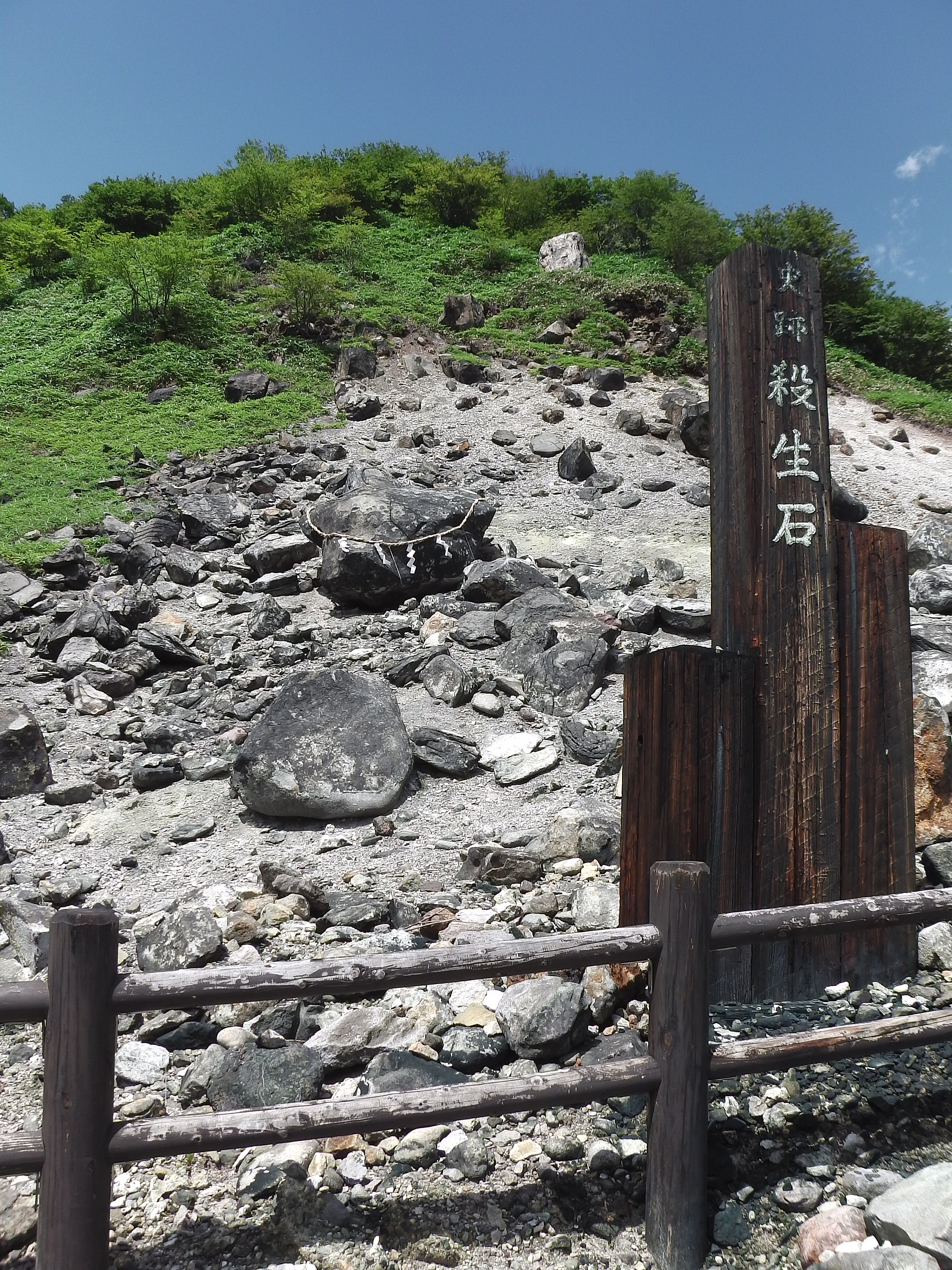
Sessho-seki in 2016

The Sessho-seki (殺生石, Sesshōseki), or "Killing Stone", is a stone in the volcanic mountains of Nasu, an area of Tochigi Prefecture, Japan, that is famous for sulphurous hot springs. In Japanese mythology, the stone is said to kill anyone who comes into contact with it. In Japan, rocks and large stones in areas where volcanic toxic gases are generated are often named Sessho-seki (殺生石), meaning Killing Stone, and the representative of such stones is this one associated with the legend of Tamamo-no-Mae and the nine-tailed fox.

== Legend ==
The stone is believed to be the transformed corpse of Tamamo-no-Mae, a beautiful woman who was exposed as a nine-tailed fox working for an evil daimyō plotting to kill Emperor Konoe and take his throne. According to the otogi-zōshi, when the nine-tailed fox was killed by the famous warrior named Miura-no-suke, her body became the Sessho-seki. Later, a Buddhist priest called Genno stopped for a rest near the stone and was threatened by the spirit of Tamamo-no-Mae. Genno performed exorcism rituals and begged the spirit to consider her salvation. Tamamo-no-Mae relented and swore never to haunt the stone again.

== Split ==
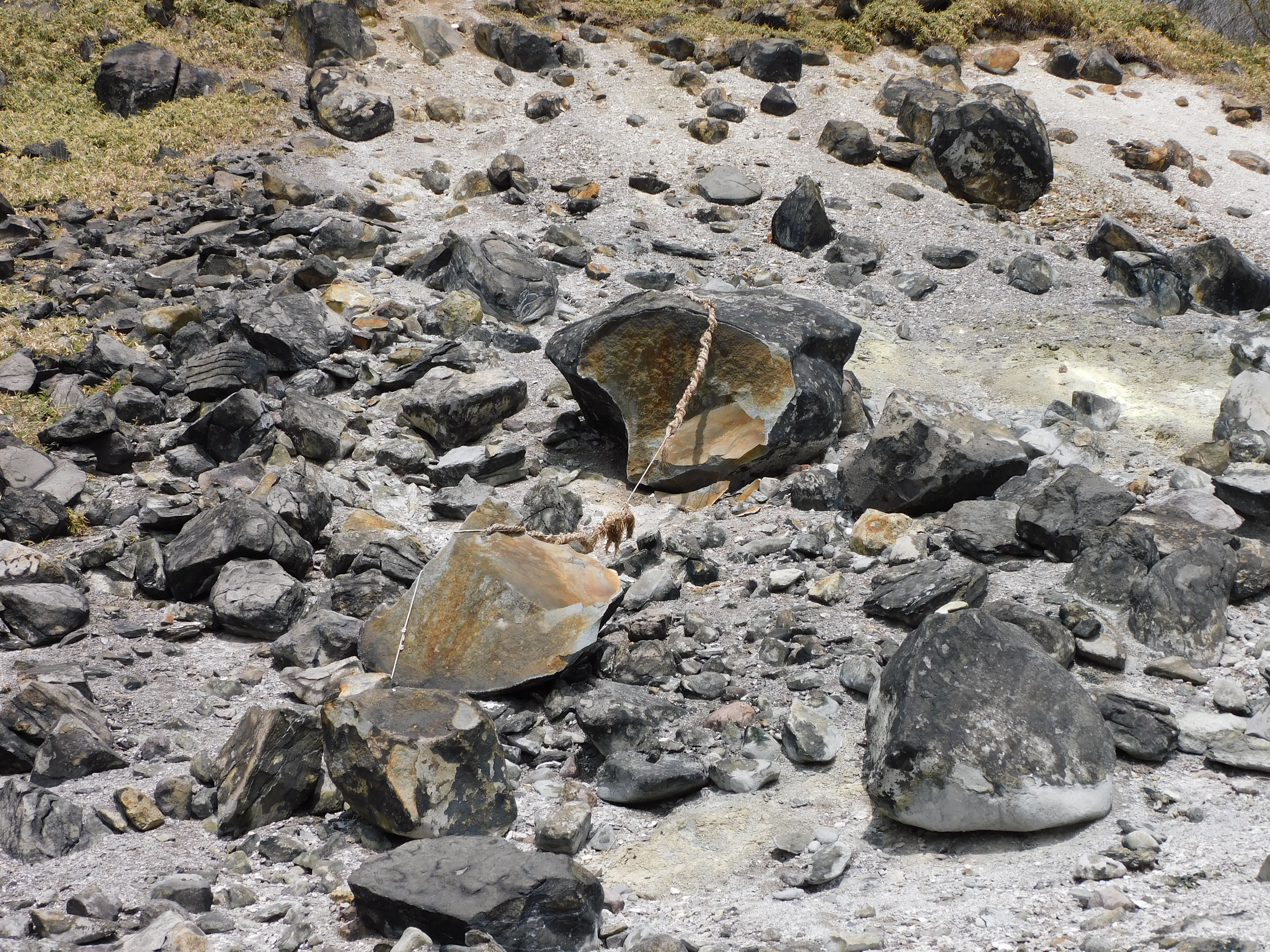
Sessho-seki in May 2022

It was reported on March 5, 2022, that the stone had split into two parts, likely as a result of natural weathering. Some people expressed their fear of the exorcised Kitsune. On 26 March 2022, the local government had priests host a ceremony to appease the spirit and pacify the beast at the site with prayers, offerings, and waving haraegushi upon the split rock.

== In popular culture ==
- A Noh play about the stone, attributed to Hiyoshi Sa'ami.
- It was mentioned in Oku no Hosomichi by Matsuo Bashō as he visited the stone in the 17th century and tells of his visit in his book (Narrow Road to the Deep North).
- Tamamo-no-Mae, a novel by Kido Okamoto, was based on the legend of the stone. A film adaptation, Kyuubi no Kitsune to Tobimaru (Sesshouseki) followed.
- In chapter 123 of the manga Bakidou the author used the story of the rock breaking to show the kick power of one of the characters.
- The legend was made into an anime film titled Kyuubi no Kitsune to Tobimaru (Sesshouseki) (九尾の狐と飛丸(殺生石)) in 1968.

== Gallery ==
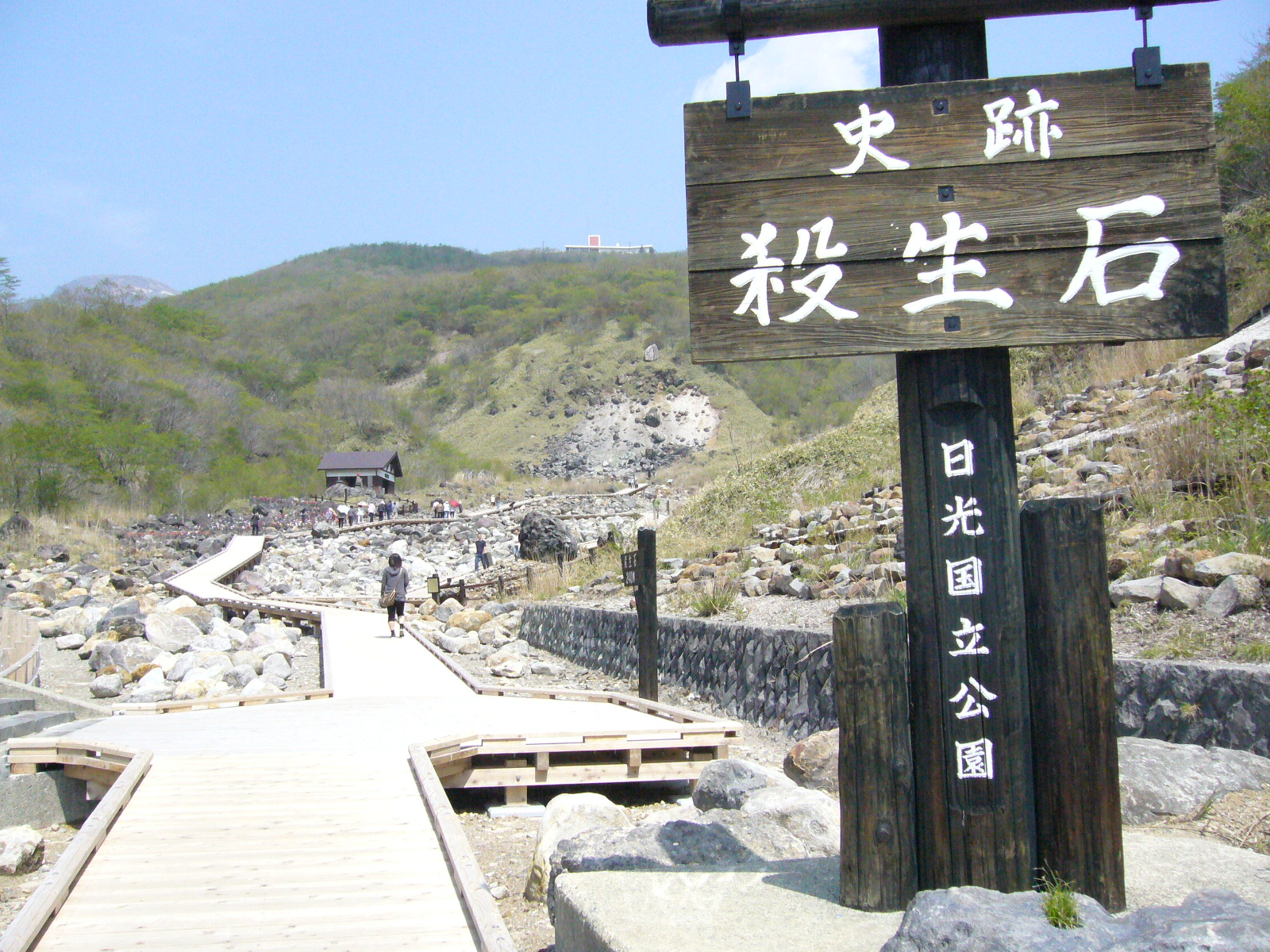
Entrance to the area

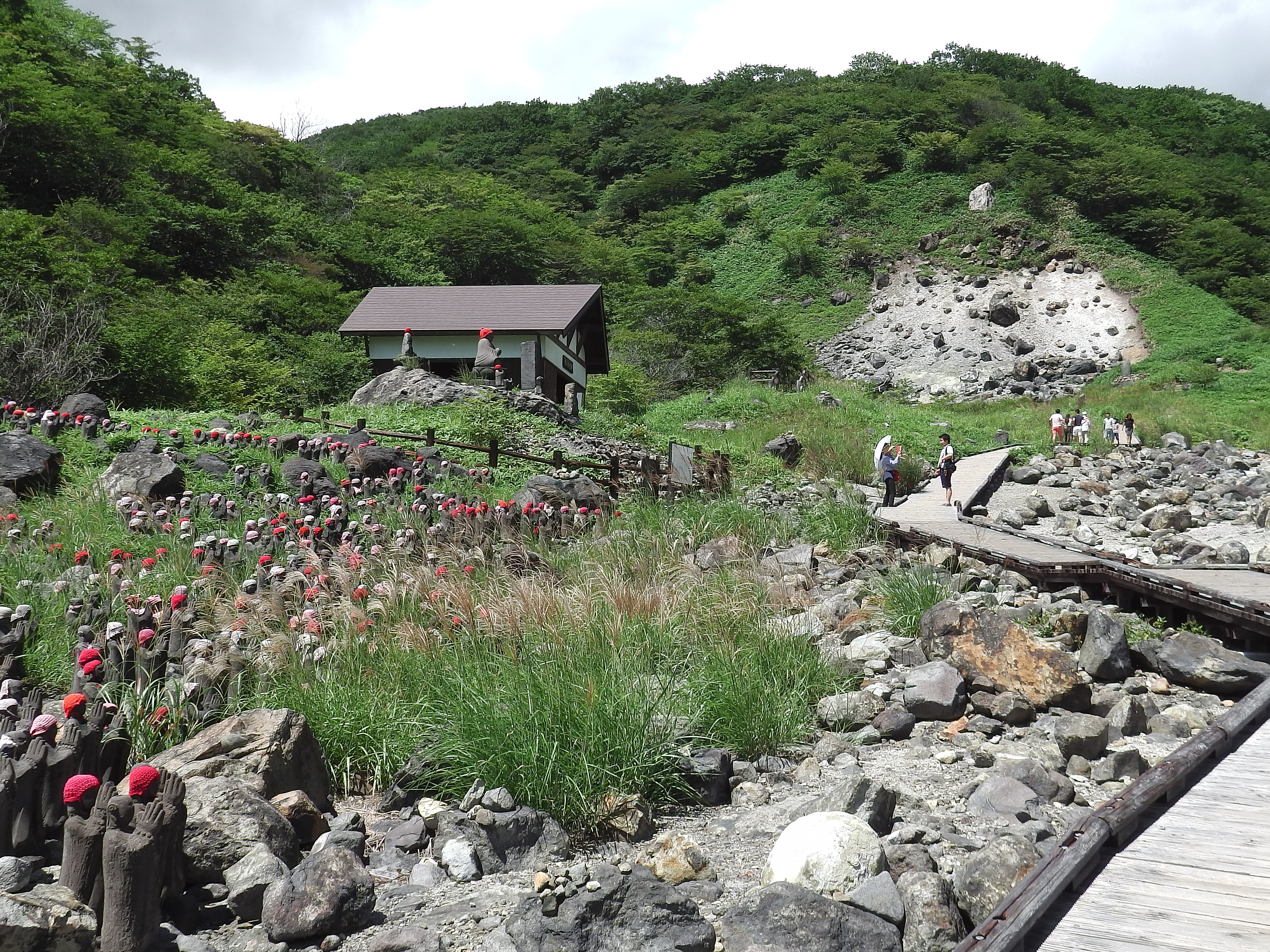
A thousand Jizōs at the site

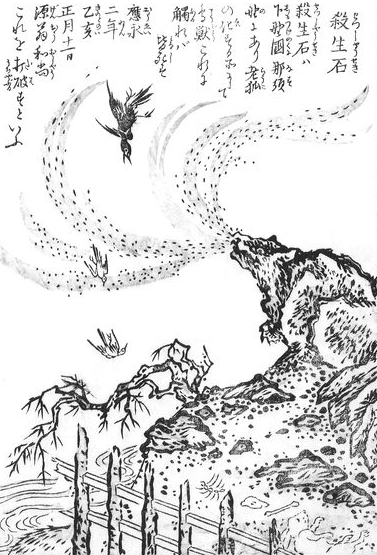
Print by Toriyama Sekien

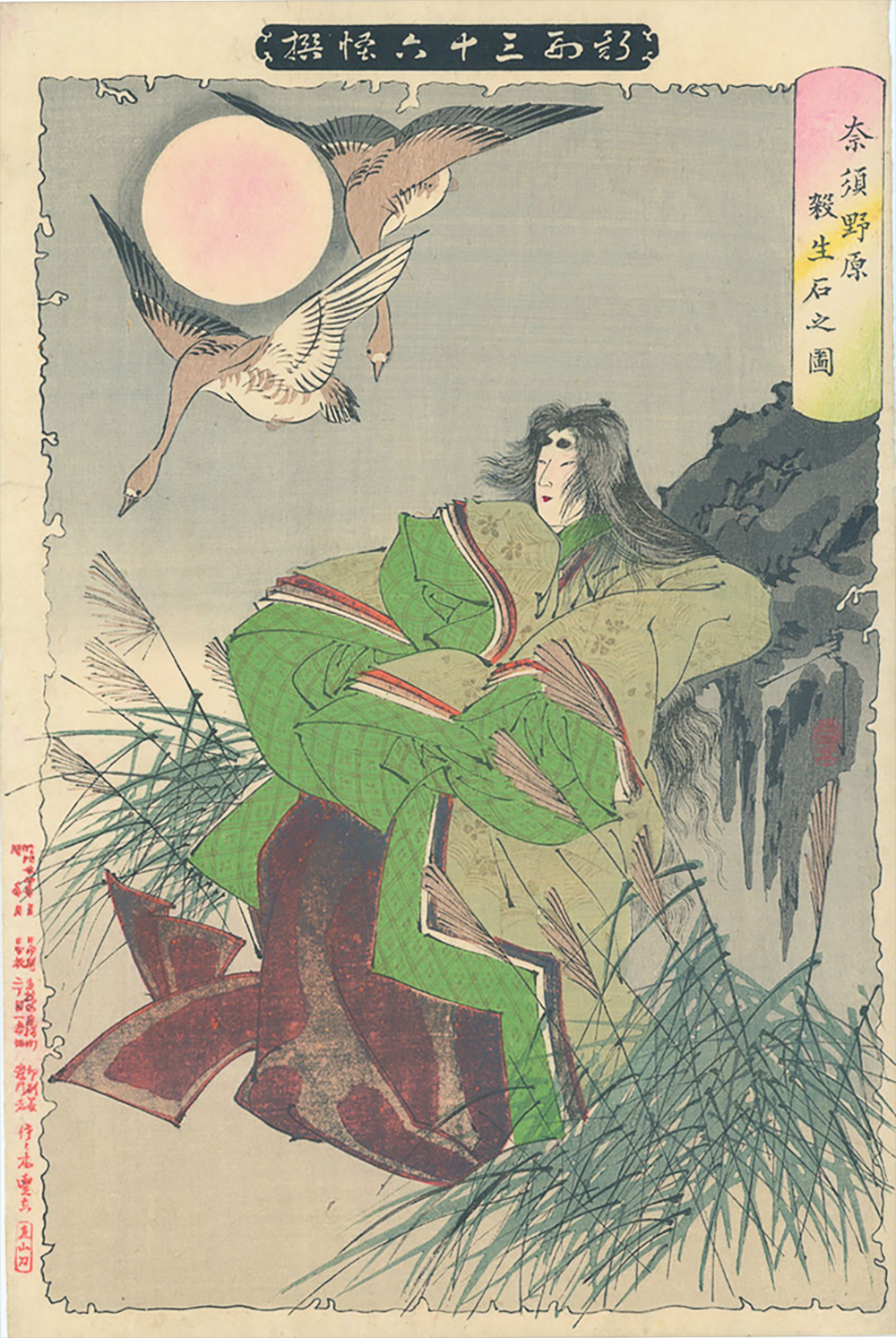
Print by Yoshitoshi

== See also ==
- List of individual rocks
