= Kasuya, Tokyo =

Kasuya 粕谷
- District
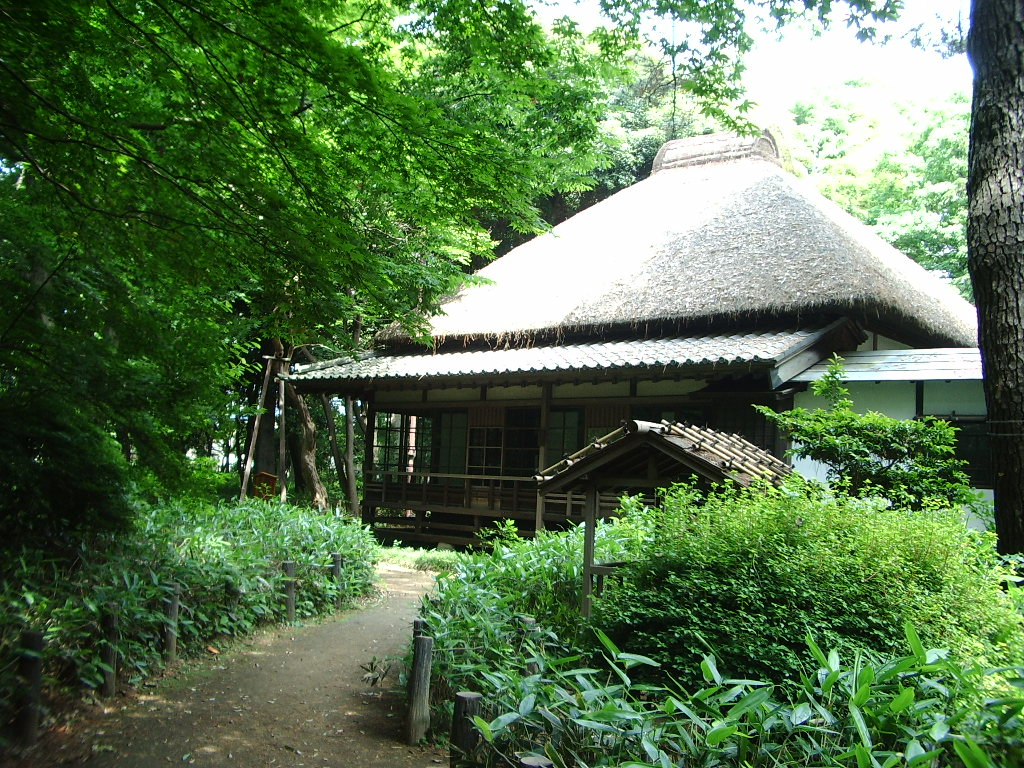

- Location within Special wards of Tokyo
- Coordinates: 35°39′47.01″N 139°36′18.81″E
- Country: Japan
- City: Tokyo
- Ward: Setagaya

Population (September 1, 2019)
  - Total: 12,850
- Time zone: UTC+9 (JST)
- Postal code: 157-0063
- Area code: 03

Kasuya (粕谷) is a district of Setagaya, Tokyo, Japan.

== Education ==
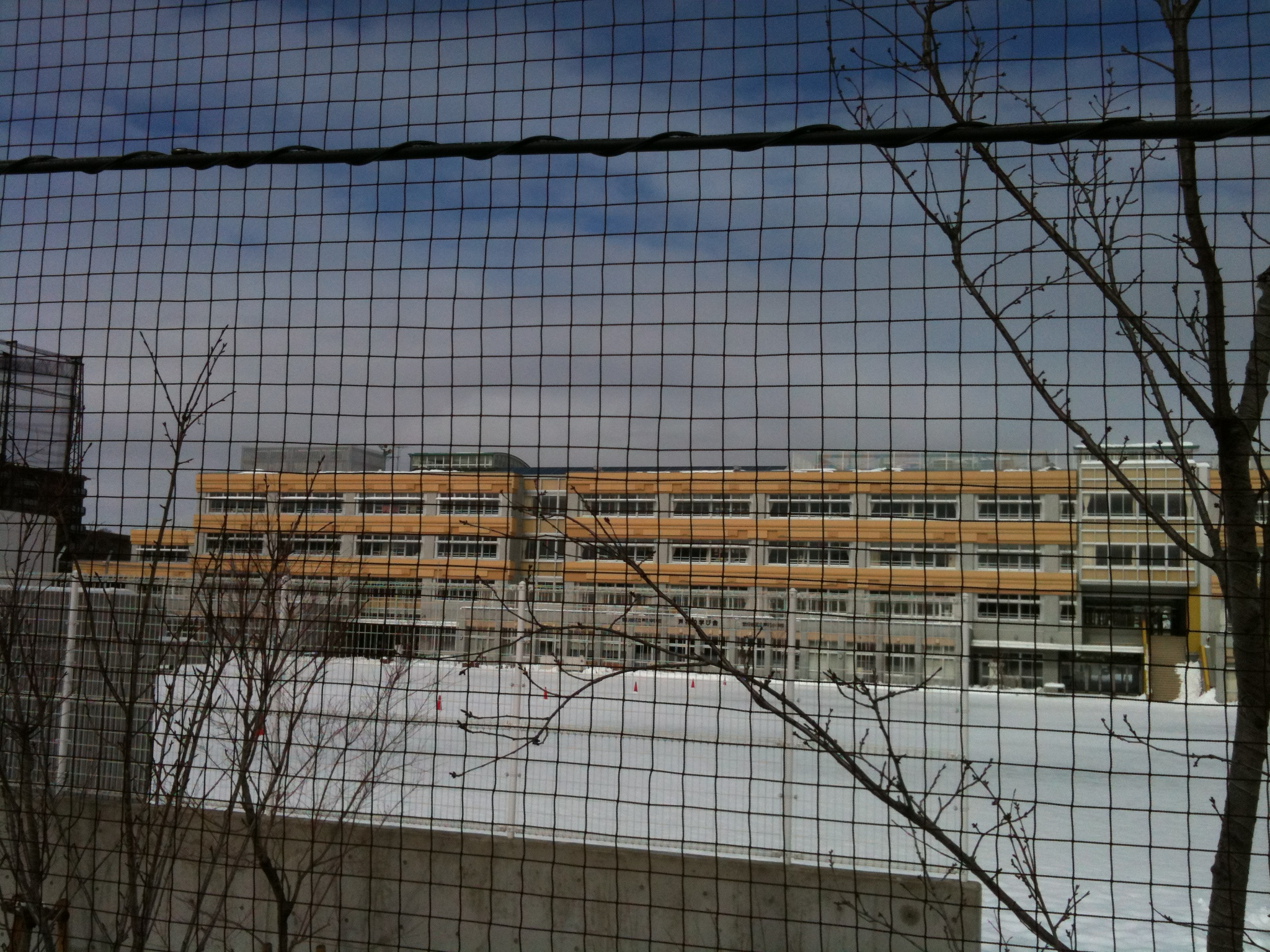
Roka Junior High School (芦花中学校)

Setagaya Board of Education operates public elementary and junior high schools.

Kasuya 1-2 and 4-chome are zoned to Roka Elementary School (芦花小学校) and Roka Junior High School (芦花中学校). 3-chome is zoned to Tsukado Elementary School (塚戸小学校) and Chitose Junior High School (千歳中学校).
