= Kameoka Hachimangū =

Shinto shrine in Aoba-ku, Sendai, Japan

Coordinates: 38.2616°N 140.8431°E

Kameoka Hachimangū 亀岡八幡宮
- Crest of the Date clan

Religion
- Affiliation: Shinto
- Deity: Hachiman
- Leadership: Kōriyama Munekatsu

Location
- Location: 62 Kawauchi, Kameoka-chō Aoba-ku, Sendai, Miyagi
- Interactive map of Kameoka Hachimangū 亀岡八幡宮

Architecture
- Founder: Date Tomomune
- Established: 1190, moved to present site 1681, rebuilt October 1965.

Website
- www.hachimanguu.org

Kameoka Hachimangū (亀岡八幡宮) is a Shinto shrine in Aoba-ku, Sendai, Miyagi, Japan. It is the tutelary shrine of the Date clan.

== History ==
Kameoka Hachimangū was founded in 1190 as a branch of Tsurugaoka Hachimangū by Date Tomomune, the Date clan founder, at Takako, in the former town of Hobara, now a part of modern Date City in Fukushima Prefecture. The 1719 text Ōū Kanseki Monrōshi, however, claims that the shrine was founded by Tomomune's son, Date Munemura. A legend in the Date clan holds that a mythical black turtle, one of the Four Symbols, appeared as the shrine was under construction, thus prompting its name of Kameoka ("Turtle Hill") Hachimangū.

In 1427, the shrine was relocated to Yanagawa. In 1532, Date Tanemune, the 14th hereditary lord of the Date Clan moved and brought the shrine with him. In 1570, it was moved back to Yanagawa. Moved to Date territory in Sendai domain by the priestly Yamada family, it was relocated to the Sendai castle town by 1602. According to the 1695 chorographic study Sendai Ika no Ko, after its move, it was called Ima-Hachiman, and upon moving to its present location in Sendai's Aoba Ward in 1681, it was renamed to "Kameoka Hachimangū." Its move to its present location was by order of Date Tsunamura. There is a smaller, subsidiary shrine, Kōratamatare-jinja, which stands beside the sanctuary along with a smaller Toyouke-Inari-jinja.

Haiku poets Matsuo Bashō and Kawai Sora visited the shrine in 1689 during the trip described in the book Oku no Hosomichi.

During the Edo period and the existence of Sendai domain, the shrine's neighborhood and its residents had privileged status. Their affairs came under the jurisdiction of the Date clan's Temple and Shrine Magistrates rather than the clan's Sendai City Magistrates who usually oversaw municipal affairs. The shrine neighborhood's residents also had the right to brew vinegar; other shrine neighborhoods, such as that around Sendai Tōshōgū, were allowed to brew sake.

The shrine was destroyed in July 1945 during the Bombing of Sendai during World War II, with only the stone torii and stone steps surviving. The shrine was rebuilt in October 1965. Its present chief priest is Kōriyama Munekatsu. One of the shrine's treasures, a sword made by Osafune Yoshimitsu, is listed as an Important Cultural Property by the Japanese government.

== In popular culture ==
Yanagawa Hachimangū in Date City, Fukushima appears as a setting in Masamune Datenikuru, an anime produced by the city in concert with GAINA. The deity Hachiman holds as collateral the soul of young Date Masamune, in a bid to prompt him toward courage and responsibility as the new Date lord. While a shrine by that name on that site exists in the 21st century, in Masamune's time, the present Kameoka Hachimangū once stood on the site of Yanagawa Hachimangū during Masamune's time and was then briefly called Yanagawa Hachimangū.
