= Yahei Miura =

Japanese long-distance runner

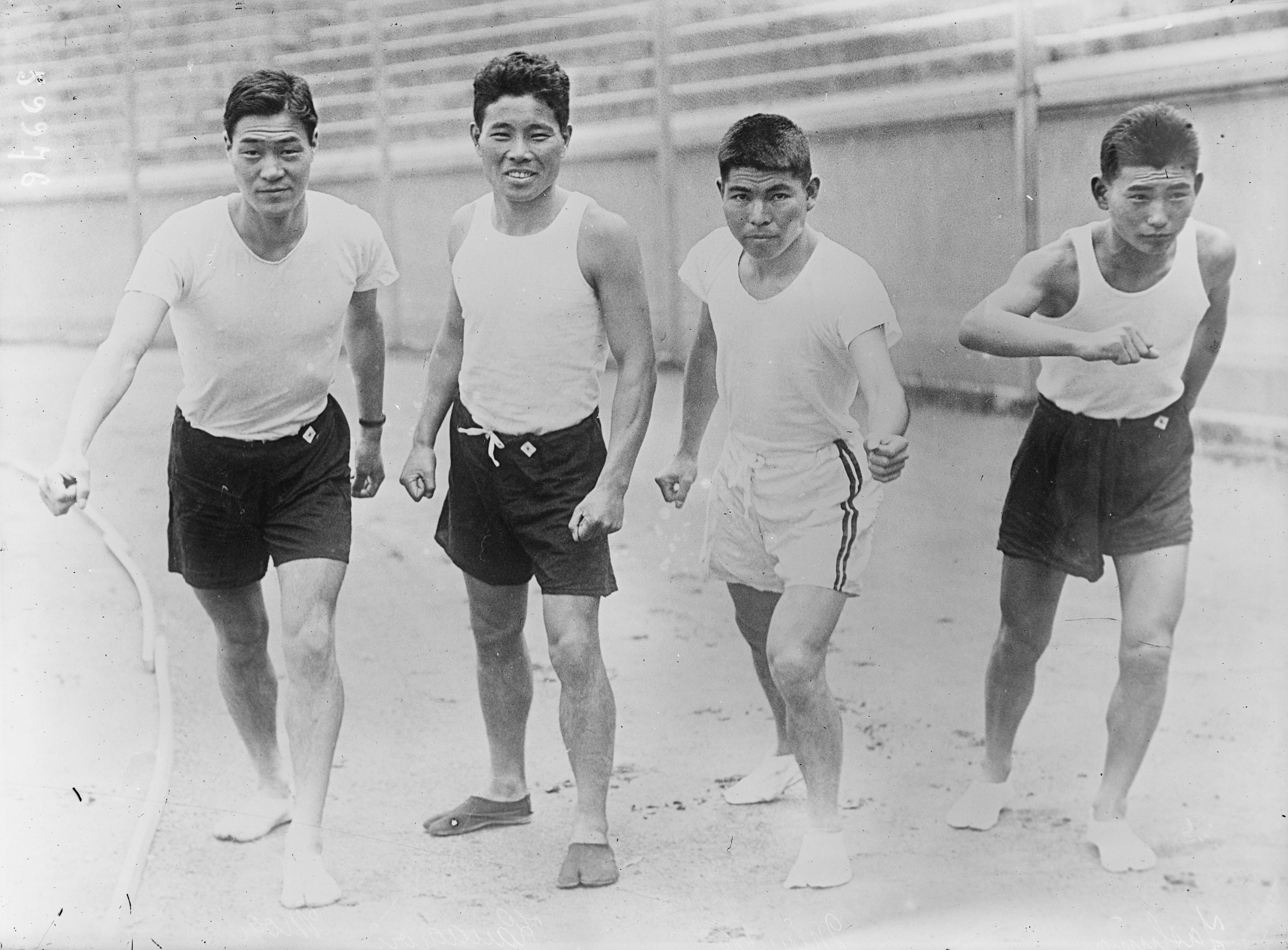
- Kenzo Yashima, Yahei Miura, Chizo Kanakuri, and Zensaku Motegi; 1920 (Miura is second from the right.)

Personal information
- Nationality: Japanese
- Born: 2 April 1891 Shirane Village, Yanagawa Town, Date, Fukushima Prefecture, Japan
- Died: 1971 (aged 79–80)

Sport
- Sport: Long-distance running
- Event: Marathon

Yahei Miura (三浦弥平, 2 April 1891 – 1971) was a Japanese long-distance runner. He competed in the marathon at the 1920 and 1924 Summer Olympics.

== Biography ==
Yahei Miura was born in the village of Shirane, in present-day Yanagawa, now a part of Date, Fukushima Prefecture. As a child, he was often sick to the point of having to leave school for months at a time. He used this time to exercise and strengthen his body, setting the foundation for his life as an athlete. At the age of twenty-four, Miura entered Waseda University, where he was a member of the racing club. Five years later, he placed 24th in the 1920 Olympic marathon in Antwerp, Belgium.

Miura spent the following years studying in Belgium. He then participated in the 1924 Paris Olympics before returning to Shirane Village in 1928. He went on to be an active member of the community. He founded the "Momo Marathon" held in September in Date's former town of Hobara. Additionally, the "Miura Yahei Road Race" is held in his honor in Yanagawa in October.
