= Shutoku Museum of Art =

Museum of art in Koori, Fukushima, Japan

- 種徳美術館
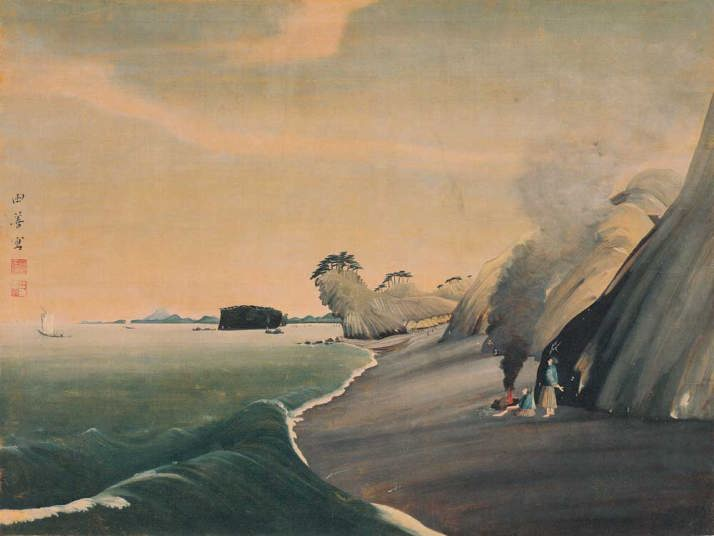
- Shichirigahama by Aōdō Denzen
- Interactive map of the Shutoku Museum of Art area

General information
- Location: 12 Jin'ya, Koori, Fukushima Prefecture, Japan
- Coordinates: 37°50′36″N 140°31′06″E
- Opened: October 1981

Website
- Official website (ja)

Shutoku Museum of Art (種徳美術館, Shutoku Bijutsukan) opened in Koori, Fukushima Prefecture, Japan in 1981. The collection comprises some 400 items, predominantly calligraphy and paintings of the Edo period and early Meiji era—including works by Kanō Tan'yū, Kanō Tsunenobu, Maruyama Ōkyo, Kakizaki Hakyō, Tani Bunchō, Kanō Hōgai, and Hashimoto Gahō—amassed by Tsunoda Rinbei, and donated to the town by his grandson. The museum has been closed since an earthquake in March 2021.

== See also ==
- Fukushima Prefectural Museum of Art
- Former Kameoka Family Home
- Kōri-Nishiyama Castle
