= Hobara =

Hobara may refer to:

- Hobara, Fukushima, a former town, now part of Date City
  - Hobara Station
- Sayaka Hobara (born 1998), Japanese badminton player
