= Saitou Hikonai =

Japanese farmer and insurgent (1709–1750)

- Born: 1709; Fukushima, Japan
- Died: 17 April 1750 (aged 40–41)
- Occupation: farmer

Saitou Hikonai (斎藤彦内, 1709-1750) was a farmer and leader of a peasants' revolt in Mutsu province's Date district (within present day Fukushima Prefecture) during the Edo Period.

In the second year of the Kan'en Era (1749), cold weather patterns severely damaged rice fields and other produce. Following the poor harvest, the annual rice tax was lowered by regional offices working under the Tokugawa shogunate within the Fukushima Domain and other areas. In neighboring Ko'ori, however, the regional government office raised the tax. This, after local farmers had applied a number of times for the tax to be lowered. Refusing to starve themselves in order to pay the tax, 17,000 people from the 68 villages within the Date district gathered to petition the office of the regional government. They organized through the circulation of a letter originally called the Warada Kaijou (わらだ廻状). The letter came to be known as the Tengu Kaijou Soudou (天狗廻状騒動) or the "Tengu's Circulating Letter Revolt," tengu being a legendary creature known, among other things, for their speed. Following the revolt, the tax was lowered, but countless farmers were arrested and tortured. Saitou is said to have returned to the government office and surrendered himself as the ringleader, joining two other farmers who had been accused; Yomoto Hanzaemon (蓬田半佐衛門) and Igari Genshichi (狩源七). The three were brutally tortured and subsequently executed on the riverbed bordering present day Date City and Koori Town on April 17 of the year following the revolt. Saitou was forty-two.

This story was printed in the national newspaper, the Asahi Shimbun in 1908, reportedly angering the emperor.

In 1918 a stone monument honoring the three men was constructed in the former town of Date (present day Date City). Six decades later, in 1979, a monument marking the site of their execution was erected through the cooperation of Date City, Fukushima City, and Ko'ori Town.

Saitou's grave is located at Fukugen Temple in Date City, Fukushima, where he is worshiped as "one who sacrificed oneself for justice" (正義のために身を捨ててはたらく人). A memorial service for the dead is held at Fukugen Temple every April 17. Descendants of Saitou Hikonai and members of the local historical society gather to present offerings of flowers to the grave.
