= Mount Ryōzen =

Mountain in Fukushima Prefecture, Japan

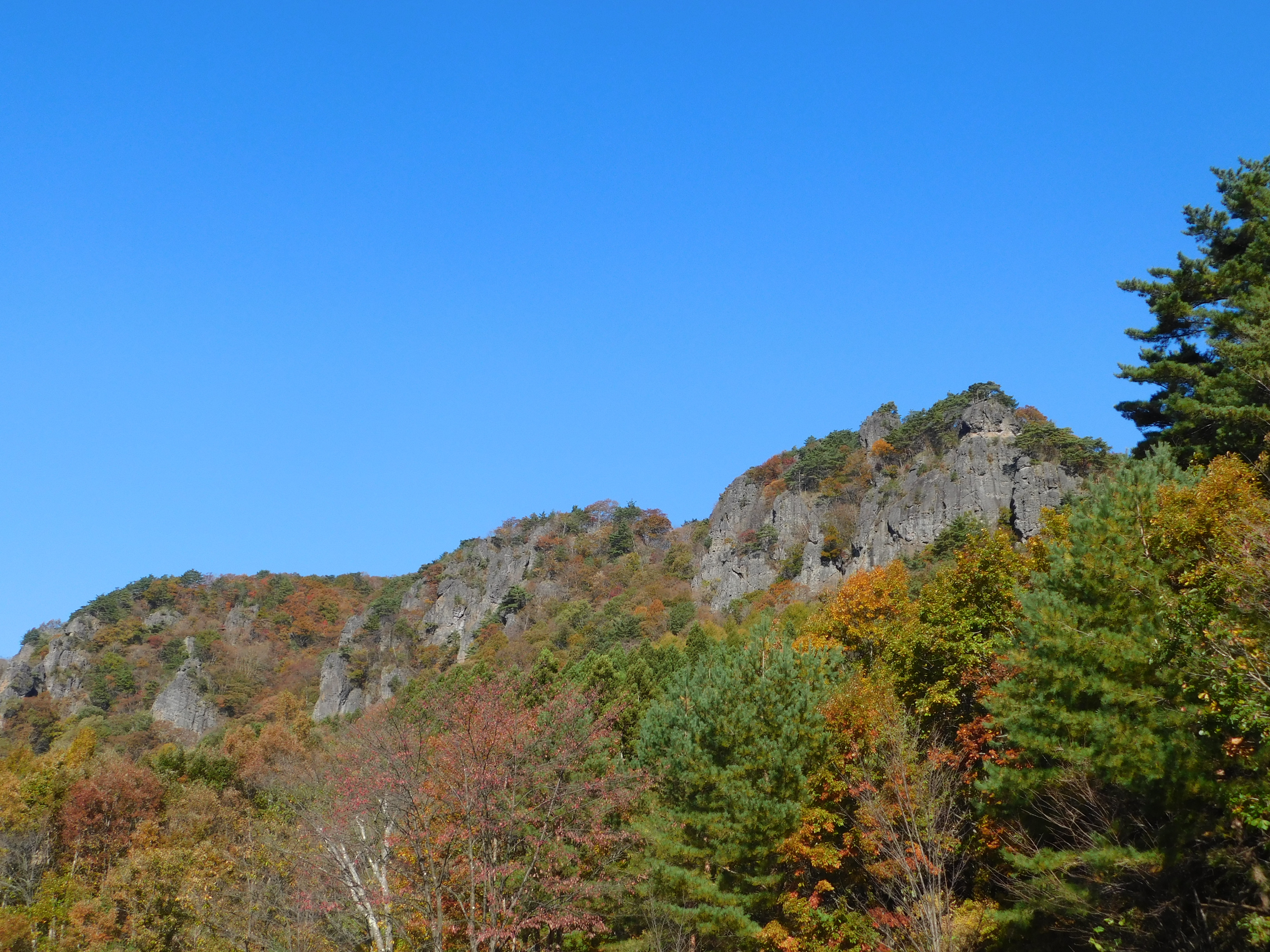
- Mount Ryōzen in Fall

Highest point
- Elevation: 825 m (2,707 ft)
- Coordinates: 37°46′27″N 140°40′59″E

Naming
- Native name: 霊山（りょうぜん） (Japanese)
- English translation: Spirit Mountain

Geography
- Location within Fukushima Prefecture Location within Japan
- Country: Japan
- State: Fukushima Prefecture
- Region: Tōhoku

Climbing
- Easiest route: Hiking
- National Historic Site of Japan Place of Scenic Beauty of Japan

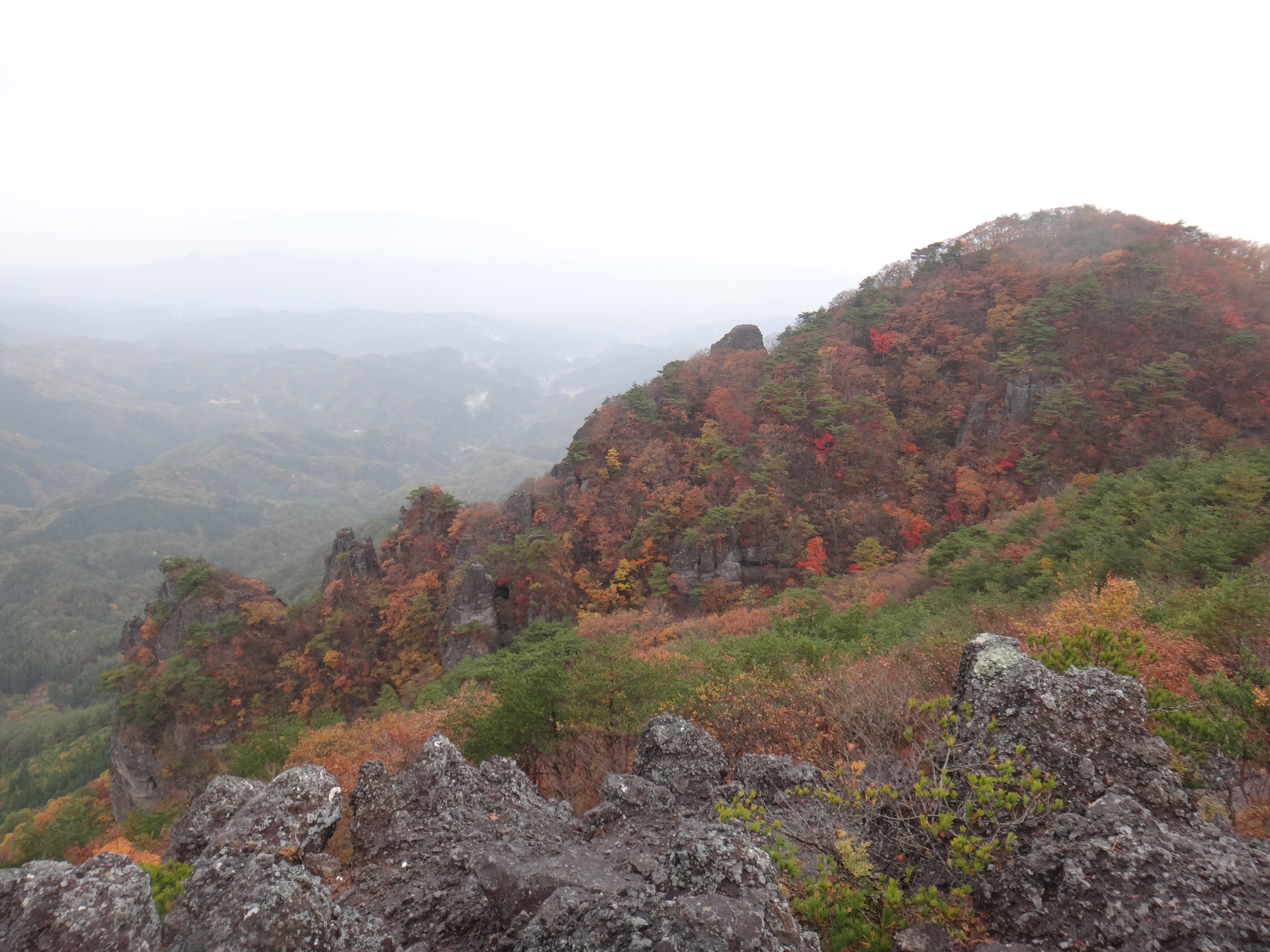
View from the mountain trail

Mount Ryōzen (霊山, Ryōzen) is a mountain on the border of Sōma and the former town of Ryōzen, in Date, Fukushima. It is 825 metres (2,707 ft) in height. Along the hiking trail are the sites of what were Ryōzen Temple and Ryōzen Castle. The mountain is listed as one of the 100 Landscapes of Japan in a contest sponsored by the Tokyo Nichi Nichi Shimbun and Osaka Mainichi Shimbun. It is also a national Place of Scenic Beauty as determined by the Agency for Cultural Affairs in Japan and is noted for its autumn foliage and a National Historic Site of Japan.

== The mountain ==
Mount Ryōzen is part of the basalt volcanic plateau known as the Abukuma Highlands in northern Fukushima. It was regarded as a sacred mountain and was once known as a center for the Shugendō mountain religion.

== History ==
=== Ryōzen Temple ===
In the first year of the Jōgan Era (859), Ennin, a Buddhist monk of the Tendai sect founded the temple Ryōzen-ji (not to be confused with Ryōzen Shrine). The name Ryōzen was adapted from that of Mount Ryojusen (or Gridhakuta) in India. The temple was burnt down in the wars of the Nanboku-chō period, but the Date clan restored the temple during the late Sengoku period. It was restored again in the early days of the Edo period.

=== Ryōzen Castle ===
Acting in support of the Southern Court, Kitabatake Akiie fortified the temple of Ryōzen-ji and turned it into his residence, which he proclaimed to be Ryōzen Castle. Acting as governor of the province of Mutsu, he proclaimed it to be the provincial capital. Kitabatake Akiie received the support of the 7th hereditary chieftain of the Date clan, Date Yukitomo against the forces of the Northern Court led by Ashikaga Takauji. In 1337 he led a campaign south, waging battle several times before he was killed on May 22, 1338, at the age of 21. Ryōzen Castle remained for nine years after Akiie's death, before it was destroyed by the Northern Court's army. The site was excavated in 1980, with a large amount of artifacts discovered, including Seto ware pottery and coins from Song dynasty China. The site was designated a National Historic Site of Japan in 1934.

== Hiking Trail ==
=== Hōjudai ===
Hōjudai (宝寿台) is the point at the top of the cliff that stands upright from the foot of the mountain. From this point, one can see the Abukuma and Azuma Mountain Ranges.

=== Kokushisawa ===
From the bottom of the valley, Kokushisawa (国司沢) seems to stand at a nearly perfect right angle. There are ladders to reach this point on the trail.

=== Tengu no Sumō Jō ===
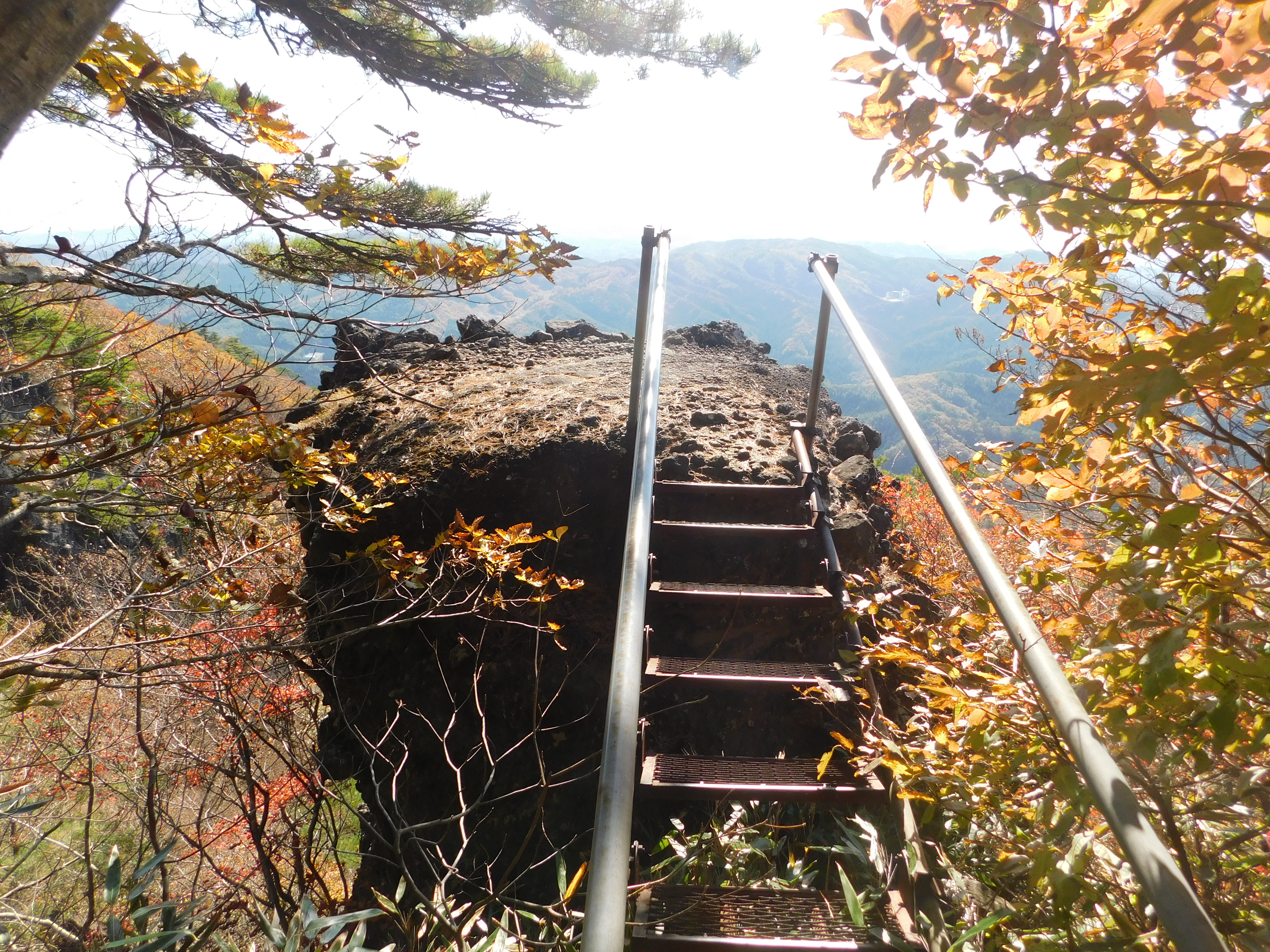
The tengu no sumo jo or "tengu sumo wrestling hall" on Mount Ryōzen.

The "tengu sumo wrestling hall" (天狗の相撲) is a rock protruding towards the West with a flat surface the size of eight tatami mats. It is said that tengu prefer this spot for wrestling.

=== Gomadan ===
Gomadan (護摩壇) is the entrance to the area that was once the site of Ryōzen Castle. There is a low hanging rock to pass under before arriving at a large flat area where it is believed that Buddhist rituals were once performed.

== Amenities ==
There is a restroom in the parking lot before the entrance to the main trail as well as one at the peak of the mountain, at the site of Ryōzen Castle.

Below the parking lot is Ryōzen's Kōsaikan (a hotel and bathhouse).

== Access ==
The entrance to the main path up the mountain is located in a parking lot connected to the Nakamura Highway (Route 115) and the Central Tohoku Expressway. It is about 45 minutes from the Kunimi Inter-change (IC) on the Central Tohoku Expressway. It is also about fifty minutes from the Fukushima-Iizaka IC, or thirty minutes by taxi from the local Abukuma Express Line's Hobara Station.

Mountain Climbing Season
Start of Mountain Climbing Season	April 29
Cherry blossom viewing period	Late April
Azaela viewing period	Early May
New green leaves	Mid-May
Autumn leaves	Late Oct - Early Nov
First snowfall	Mid-Dec
Snow thawing	Late March

== See also ==
- List of Historic Sites of Japan (Fukushima)
- List of Places of Scenic Beauty of Japan (Fukushima)
