= Miyawaki temple ruins =

Archaeological site in Date, Japan

- 宮脇廃寺跡
- Location within Fukushima Prefecture Location within Japan

Religion
- Affiliation: Buddhist
- Deity: unknown
- Rite: unknown
- Status: ruins (no public facilities)

Location
- Location: Date, Fukushima
- Country: Japan
- Interactive map of Miyawaki temple ruins
- Coordinates: 37°49′09″N 140°33′46″E

Architecture
- Founder: Date clan (?)

Miyawaki temple ruins (宮脇廃寺跡, Miyawaki Haiji ato) is an archaeological site with the ruins of a Muromachi period Buddhist temple located in what is now the town of Date, Fukushima, Japan. The temple no longer exists, but the temple grounds were designated as a National Historic Site by the Japanese government in 2014.

== Overview ==
The site is located near the northwest end of the Abukuma Mountains in a narrow valley along the road leading from Ryōkawa, the original home of the Date clan, to Mount Ryōzen. The foundation stones for two buildings built around a pond were confirmed in excavations conducted from 2006, and were found to be in good preservation. The style of the roof tiles indicates that the buildings were erected in the first half of them 15th century, and that the temple burned down in the middle of the 15th century. The name of the temple is unknown, and it does not appear in any written documentation. However, it is known from historical sources that the Date clan were strong supporters of the Ashikaga shogunate and the layout of this temple complex is representative of the "Kitayama culture" for Kyoto favored by the Ashikaga Shoguns during this period.

The site was backfilled after excavation and is now an empty field.

== See also ==
- List of Historic Sites of Japan (Fukushima)
