= Former Kameoka Family Home =

Historic building in Fukushima, Japan

Coordinates: 37°49′10.3″N 140°34′10.4″E

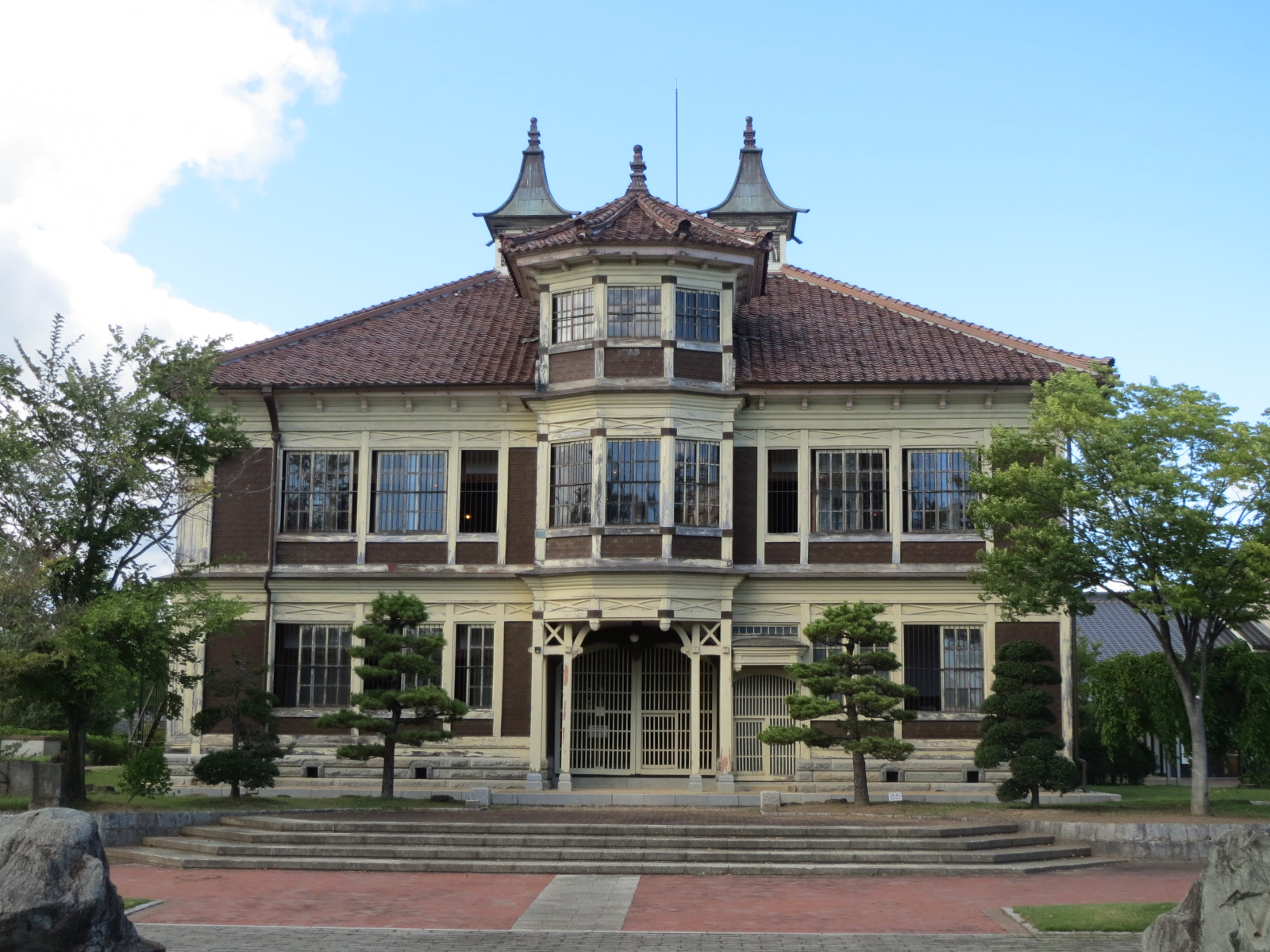
August 2018

The Former Kameoka Family Home is a residential structure that was originally located in Koori Town within the Date District of Fukushima Prefecture. It was dismantled and rebuilt within the same prefecture, in the town of Hobara Town in Date. The house is designated an Important Cultural Property of Japan.

== History ==
The house was originally constructed in about Meiji 37 (1904) by the Kameoka family, who profited from silk manufacturing in Koori Town. The building was not donated to the former Hobara Town (present day Date) until Showa 61 (1986). It was later deconstructed and relocated to Hobara Recreational Park (Hobara Sougou Kouen) in Heisei 7 (1995). Although the outside of the structure exhibits a Western style, the inside includes a mix of Japanese architectural features. The house is managed by Date's Hobara Museum of History and Culture.

== Architecture ==
The design of the building is attributed to Egawa Saburōhachi (江川三郎八), whose plan was executed by carpenter Ogasawara Kunitarō (大工小笠原国太郎) of Iizaka. The house is made of wood and includes two floors of tatami mat rooms, as well as an attic floor with an East Asian hip-and-gable roof covered in tile. The exterior of the house is pale yellow in color and takes on a Western appearance. In the center of the facade of the house is a tower with an eight sided room protruding from the third floor. The interior of the house is Japanese is style. Wide washitsu rooms are arranged in the center of each floor. Detailed woodwork using valuable wood, including Japanese zelkova and imports from Southeast Asia are spread throughout the house. Two rooms on the first floor are especially well decorated, including the ceiling and wall fixtures of the main living room. On July 25, 2016, the house was designated as an important cultural property of Japan.

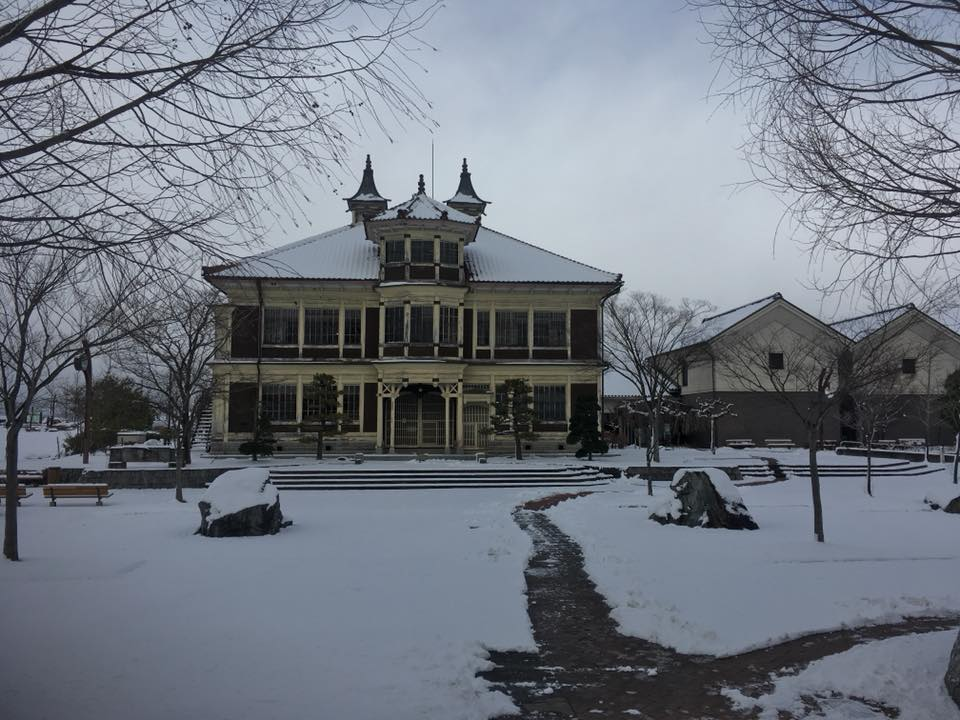
Formerk Kameoka Family Home (left), Hobara Museum of History and Culture (right)

== Access ==
- Open from 9:00 to 17:00 (final admission at 16:30)
- Closed every Tuesday and New Year Holidays (Dec. 28 - Jan. 4)
- Admission – Adults 210 yen, Children 100 yen (includes entry to the Hobara Museum of History and Culture)
- 7 minutes on foot from the Abukuma Express Line's Ōizumi Station
