= Tutiyu Tunnel =

Road tunnel in Japan

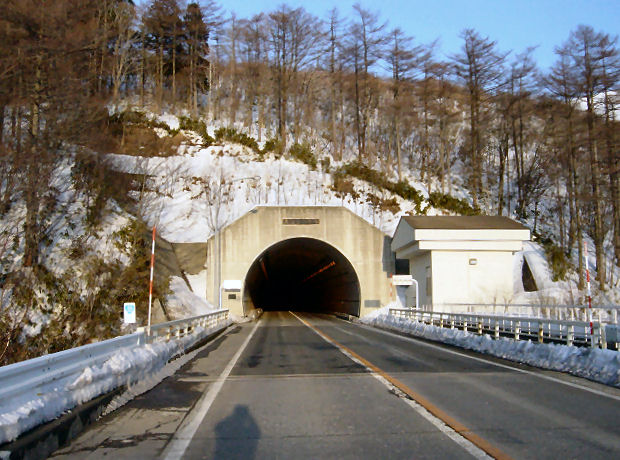
- Entrance to tunnel
- Interactive map of Tutiyu Tunnel

Overview
- Location: Fukushima Prefecture
- Coordinates: 37°39′18″N 140°16′16″E
- Route: Japan National Route 115 & Japan National Route 459
- Start: Fukushima, Fukushima
- End: Inawashiro, Fukushima

Operation
- Work began: September 7, 1982
- Constructed: November 1986
- Opened: September 27, 1989; 37 years ago

Technical
- Length: 3.36 kilometres (2.09 mi)
- No. of lanes: 2
- Operating speed: 50km/h
- Tunnel clearance: 4.7 metres (15 ft)
- Width: 9 metres (30 ft)

Tutiyu Tunnel (土湯トンネル, Tutiyu tonneru)is a Japanese road tunnel that opened September 27, 1989 between Fukushima City, and Inawashiro, Fukushima Prefecture. It is a mountain passage shared by Japan National Route 115 and Japan National Route 459 (tsuchiyu bypass). This tunnel is 3.36 kilometers long and was the longest tunnel in Fukushima Prefecture at the time of its opening. The opening of Ō-tōge Tunnel (3.94km) in 1992 exceeded this record.
