= Ryōzen, Fukushima =

Ryozen 霊山町
- Former municipality
- Interactive map of Ryozen
- Country: Japan
- Region: Tōhoku
- Prefecture: Fukushima Prefecture
- Merged: January 1, 2006 (now part of Date)

Area
  - Total: 87.33 km^{2} (33.72 sq mi)

Population (January 1, 2003)
  - Total: 9,491
  - Density: 106.68/km^{2} (276.3/sq mi)
- Time zone: UTC+09:00 (JST)
- Symbols
- Bird: the varied tit
- Flower: Gentiana scabra
- Tree: Japanese red pine

Ryōzen (霊山町, Ryōzen-machi) is one of the five towns incorporated into Date City, Fukushima Prefecture, Japan, along with the former towns of Date, Hobara, Tsukidate, and Yanagawa. It was formerly an independent town located in Date District.

== Population ==
As of 2003, the town had an estimated population of 9,491 and a density of 108.68 persons per km^{2}. The total area is 87.33 km^{2}.

== History ==
The town of Ryōzen was formed with the January 31, 1955 merger of the town of Kakeda (掛田町, Kakeda-machi) and the villages of Ryōzen (霊山村, Ryōzen-mura), Ishido (石戸村, Ishido-mura) and Shōkoku (小国村, Shōkoku-mura).

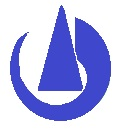
Ryozen Town Symbol

In anticipation of the town's 10th anniversary after the 1955 merger, the town symbol was established in 1964. It includes a representation of the hiragana character "ri" (り), as in "ryouzen," with the image of a mountain in the center. In 1975, the town's official tree, flower, and bird were established as the Japanese red pine, the gentiana scabra, and the varied tit, respectively.

On January 1, 2006, Ryōzen was merged with the former towns of Date, Hobara, Tsukidate, and Yanagawa to create Date City.

== Local attractions ==
=== Historic Sites ===
==== Mount Ryozen and Kitabatake Akiie ====
Mount Ryōzen is a mountain on the border of Soma City that stands at 825 meters. During the Heian Period, the original Ryōzen Temple (or Ryōzen-ji; not to be confused with Ryōzen Shrine, which was founded in 1881) was constructed on Mount Ryōzen, where it flourished as a center of Buddhist learning in the North for hundreds of years. During the War of the Northern and Southern Courts, otherwise known as the Nanboku-cho War, then governor of the province of Mutsu, Kitabatake Akiie had Ryozen Castle constructed within the temple grounds and stayed there for a number of months between military campaigns. Having left Ryōzen to pursue Ashikaga Takauji, Akiie died in battle at the young age of twenty-one. A statue of Akiie stands at the foot of Mount Ryōzen, at one entrance to Ryōzen Shrine, where he is enshrined with his father, Kitabatake Chikafusa.

==== Mount Chausu and Princess Gozen ====
Mount Chausu is a mountain standing at 252.5 meters in the former town of Kakeda, that is thought to have been the site of Kakeda Castle. Kakeda Castle was destroyed by Kakeda Yoshimune during the Tenbun Revolt, a civil war within the Date Clan that began in the eleventh year of the Tenbun Era (1542), when the 14th lord of the clan, Date Tanemune had a falling out with his son, Date Harumune, the 15th lord of the Date Clan. One reason for the rebellion was Tanemune's manner of gaining power through the marriage of his children. Tanemune's daughter, Kakeda Gozen, is said to have been in a relation with a retainer by the name of Nakajima Ise. Ise took advantage of the commotion caused by the revolt and brought Princess Gozen away to Kanayama Castle in Miyagi Prefecture's Marumori Town. Princess Gozen is then said to have thrown herself into a well out of grief. A Kan'non Temple on Mount Chausu is dedicated to her memory.

==== Others ====
- Suzutake Shrine
- Hie Shrine
- Ryōzen Kōsaikan (a hotel and bathhouse)
- Ryōzen Children's Village (park)
- Ryōzen Satoyama School

=== Ryōzen Taiko Drum Festival ===
The Ryōzen Taiko Drum Festival (霊山太鼓まつり) or Date na Taiko Drum Festival (だてな太鼓まつり) is an annual two-day festival held in August. While the festival originated in the town of Ryōzen, in recent years it has been held at Hobara Total Park (保原総合公園) in Hobara Town, the central area of Date City. There is usually a comedic performance, among other stage acts, food and activity booths, as well as a battle between teams of taiko drum performers.

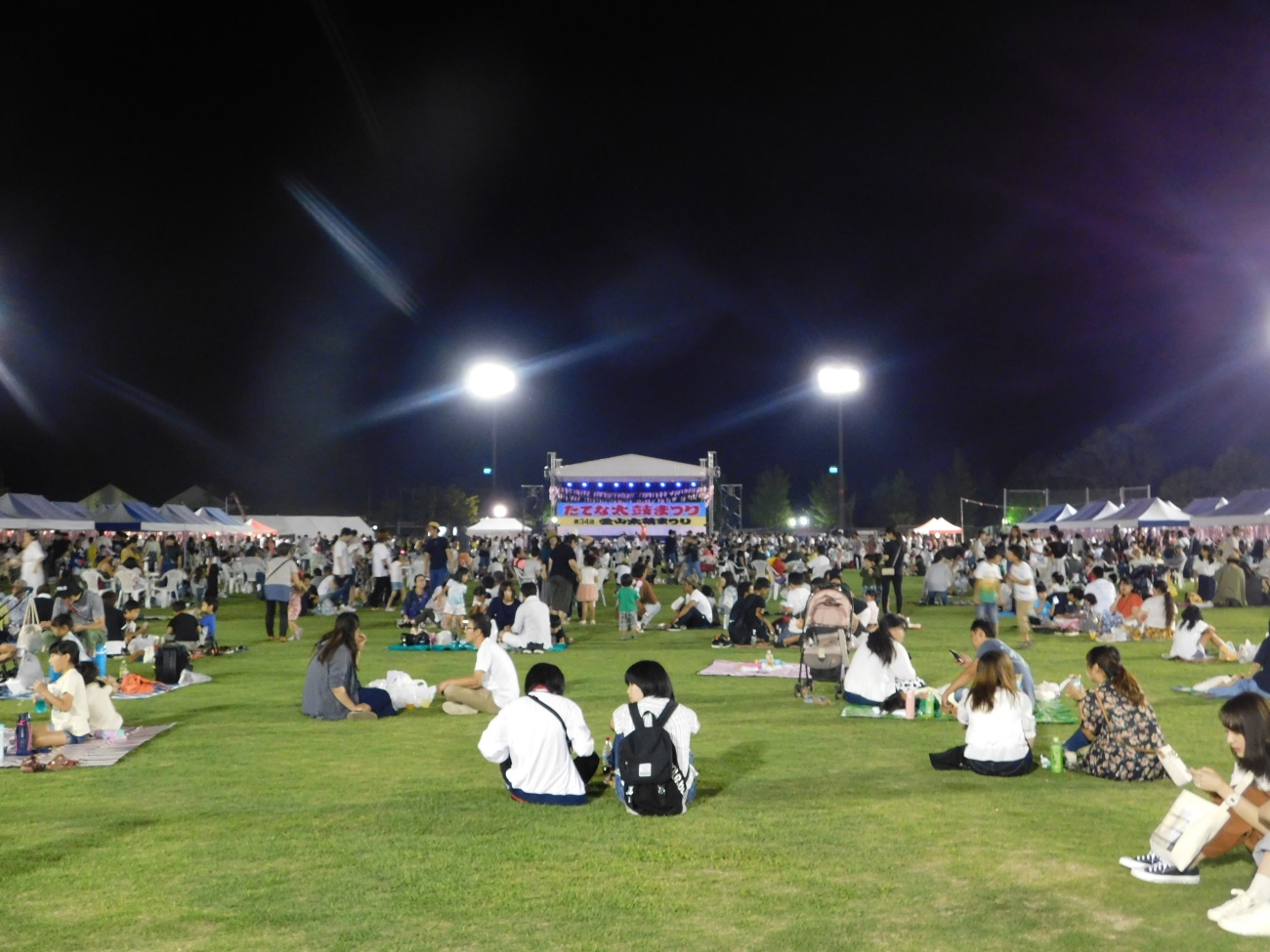
