= Date Kunishige =

Japanese samurai (1841–1904)

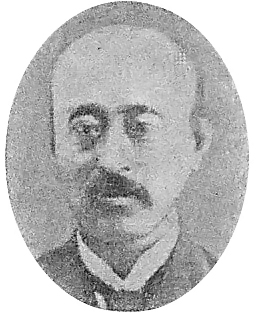
Date Kunishige.

Date Kunishige (伊達 邦成; DAH-tay; 10 December 1841 – 29 November 1904) was a Japanese samurai of the late Edo period. The 15th head of the Watari-Date family, Kuninari served as a retainer of Sendai han. Following the defeat of the Sendai domain during the Boshin War, he assisted in helping the daimyō of Sendai, Date Munemoto, in declaring allegiance to the new government. Kuninari requested permission from the Meiji Government to settle in Hokkaido and assist in land reclamation; this was granted in January 1870 (Meiji 3). Kuninari led his retainers north and settled in the Usu district (有珠郡, Usu-gun), succeeding in reclamation at the new Date Village (伊達村, Date-mura), which through mergers became the current Date City.

== See also ==
- Date clan

== Notes ==
The emblem (mon) of the Date clan
