= Date Tomomune =

Japanese nobleman and samurai

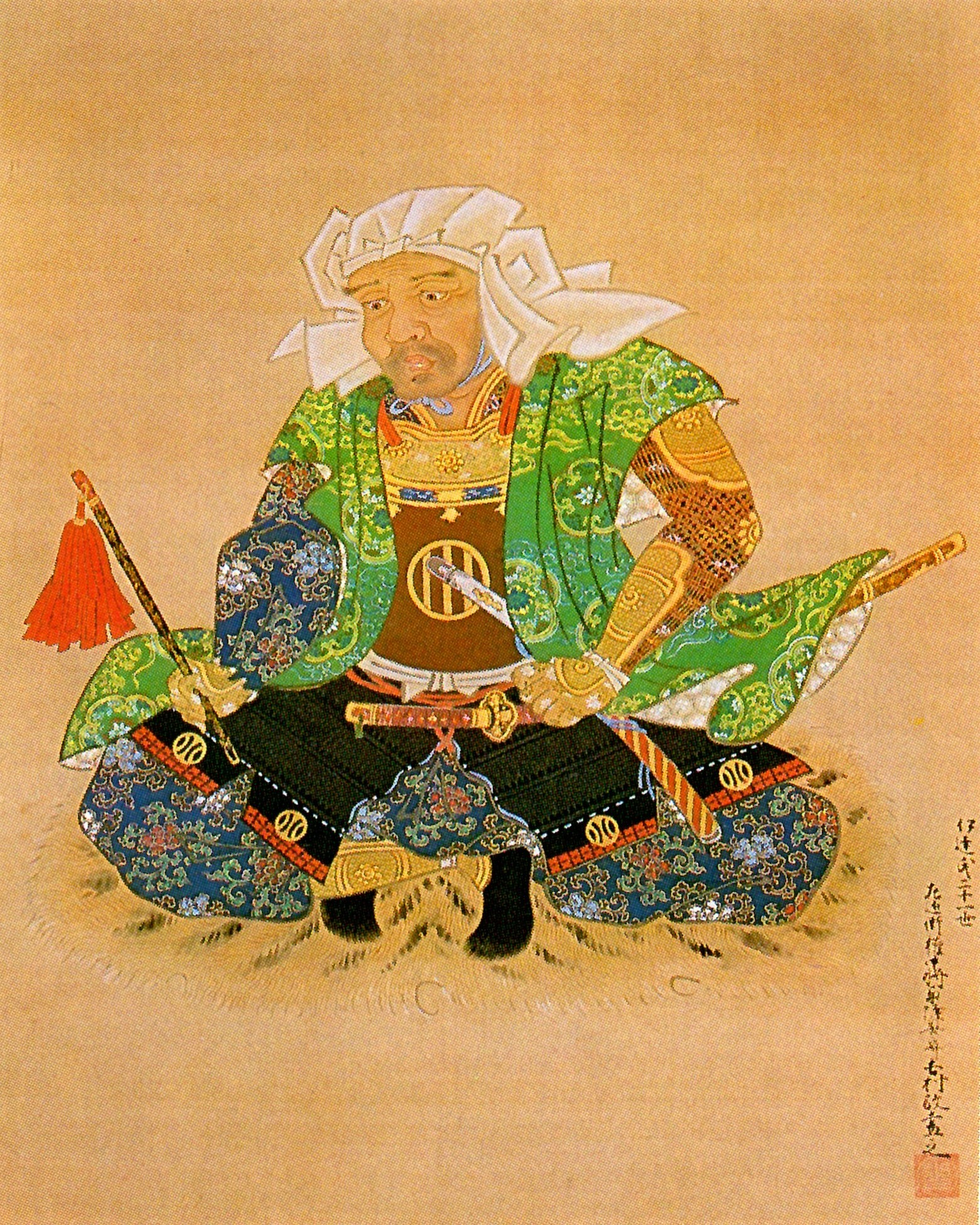
- Born: Nakamura Hitachi-nyudo Nensai
- Successor: Date Munemura

Date Tomomune (伊達 朝宗, DAH-tay; 1129 – October 23, 1199) was a samurai during the closing years of the Heian period through to the beginning of the Kamakura period. He is known as the founder of the Date Clan.

== Biography ==
In 1189, Nakamura Hitachi-nyudo Nensai received the territory of Date from Minamoto Yoritomo as a result of his participation in the Battle of Ōshu. He then changed his name to Date Tomomune and founded the Date Clan at Takakogaoka Castle, in the present day town of Hobara in Date City, Fukushima Prefecture.

His grave is in the present day town of Koori in Fukushima.

== Lineage ==
- Father: Nakamura Mitsutaka (中村 光隆)
- Mother: Daughter of Minamoto no Tameyoshi (源 為義, 1096 – August 17, 1156)
- Children:
  - Eldest son: Isa Tamemune (伊佐 為宗, ? - July 5, 1221)
  - Second son: Date Munemura (伊達 宗村, 1173? - November 11, 1251)
  - Third son: Nakamura Suketsuna (中村 資綱)
  - Fourth son: Tameie (為家)
  - Fifth son: Tameyuki (為行)
  - Sixth son: Tade Sanetsuna (田手 実綱)
  - Seventh son: 延厳 (monk)
  - Eighth son: Tomomoto (朝基)
  - Ninth son: Teramoto Tameyasu (寺本 為保)
  - Daughter: Daishin no Tsubone (大進局) - wife of Minamoto Yoritomo
  - Adopted child: Nakamura Tomosada (中村朝定)

== In popular culture ==
Date Tomomune is prominently featured in the anime Masamune Datenicle, produced by the City of Date in Fukushima in collaboration with Fukushima Gainax. Throughout the series, a young Date Masamune receives the help of his ancestors while struggling with his new role as the 17th lord of the Date Clan. Date Tomomune appears in the first episode.

Date Tomomune appears in a secondary mission of the 2020 video game Nioh 2, as part of The Tengu's Disciple DLC. The mission takes place around the same time as the Genpei War, and sees Tomomune team up with the game's protagonist to explore a cave filled with spirit stones capable of corrupting humans.
