= Date Yasumune =

Japanese head of the Date Clan (born 1959)

The emblem (mon) of the Date clan

Yasumune Date (伊達泰宗, DAH-tay; Date Yasumune, born February 9, 1959) is a Japanese historian, author and the 34th head of the Date clan.

== Personal life ==
Date was born and raised in Tokyo. After the death of his father, Date Sadamune, he moved to Miyagi Prefecture. His mother was Onodera Toshiko.

He is a qualified curator and an expert in history, working on the restoration of historical heritage related to the Date family. He has held many positions such as director of the Zuihoden Museum, director of Date Taizan Bunko, director of the Tohoku Broadcasting Culture Corporation, and is energetically active, and is widely engaged in business with Masamune-related goods and Hasekura Tsunenaga-related goods, but there are pros and cons to registering the family crest as a trademark.

== See also ==
- Dokuganryū Masamune
