= Masamune Datenicle =

Japanese anime television series

政宗ダテニクル (Masamune Date ni Kuru)
- Genre: Historical, supernatural
- Anime television series
- Directed by: Yoshinori Asao (Chief); Satoru Kiyomaru
- Music by: Mafumafu
- Studio: Fukushima Gainax
- Original run: May 2, 2016 – March 30, 2018
- Episodes: 6

Masamune Datenicle is a Japanese anime series produced through the cooperation of the anime studio Gaina (formerly known as Fukushima Gainax) and the city of Date, Fukushima. It is one of a number of anime produced by Gaina in promotion of Fukushima Prefecture. Otherwise known as Masamune Date ni Kuru (政宗ダテニクル), the anime references not only the word "chronicle" in its title, but also the Japanese phrase "come to Date."

== Plot ==
The series follows a young Date Masamune as he prepares for his first battle. Upon praying at the Date family shrine, Masamune is met by a dragon deity that bestows him with a jewel granting him the power to summon former leaders of the Date Clan to help him on his journey.

== Characters ==
- Date Masamune (伊達政宗), voiced by: Ayumu Murase
- Katakura Kojūrō Kagetsuna (片倉小十郎景綱), voiced by: Yūsuke Kobayashi
- Claude (クロード, Kurōdo), voiced by: Sōichirō Hoshi
- Megohime (愛姫, Megohime), voiced by: Sarah Emi Bridcutt
- Date Tomomune (伊達朝宗), voiced by: Toshiyuki Morikawa
- Date Shigezane (伊達成実), voiced by: Ryōta Ōsaka (逢坂良太)
- Mysterious Monkey Mask Man (謎の猿面, Nazo no Sarumen), voiced by: Yamamoto Kanehira (山本兼平)
- Dragon God (龍神, Ryūjin), voiced by: Naomi Shindō
- Date Kojirō (伊達小次郎), voiced by: Rikako Yamaguchi
- 9th Lord Masamune (9代政宗, Kyū-dai Masamune), voiced by: Toshiki Masuda
- 2nd Lord Munemura (2代宗村, Ni-dai Munemura), voiced by: Kaito Ishikawa
- 3rd Lord Yoshihiro (3代義広, San-dai Yoshihiro), voiced by: Yūichirō Umehara
- 4th Lord Masayori (4代政依, Yon-dai Masayori), voiced by: Amatsuki (天月)
- 5th Lord Munetsuna (5代宗綱, Go-dai Munetsuna), voiced by: KENN
- 6th Lord Motomune (6代基宗, Roku-dai Motomune), voiced by: Yoshitsugu Matsuoka
- 7th Lord Yukitomo (7代行朝, Shichi-dai Yukitomo), voiced by: Daiki Yamashita
- 10th Lord Ujimune (10代氏宗, Jū-dai Ujimune), voiced by: Hiroyuki Endō (遠藤広之)
- 12th Lord Shigemune (12代成宗, Jū-ni-dai Shigemune), voiced by: Yuma Uchida
- Anpon (あんぽん), voiced by: Tanaka Neo (田中音緒)
- Monmo (もんも), voiced by: Morioka Yuka (森岡由花)

== Reception ==
Masamune Datenicle was included in the 2019 edition of the 88 Japanese Anime Spots by the anime tourism association.
