= Hulaing Babies =

Japanese anime television series

フライングベイビーズ (Furaingu Beibīzu)
- Anime television series
- Directed by: Yoshinori Asao
- Written by: Ikoma
- Music by: F.M.F
- Studio: Fukushima Gaina
- Original network: TV Tokyo, AT-X, FCT
- Original run: January 11, 2019 – March 29, 2019
- Episodes: 12
- Anime television series

Hulaing Babies☆Petit
- Directed by: Yoshinori Asao
- Written by: Ikoma
- Music by: F.M.F
- Studio: Fukushima Gaina
- Original network: TV Tokyo, AT-X, FCT
- Original run: January 8, 2020 – March 25, 2020
- Episodes: 12

Hulaing Babies (フライングベイビーズ, Furaingu Beibīzu) is a Japanese anime television series produced by Gaina. The series aired from January 11 to March 29, 2019. An anime spinoff titled Hulaing Babies☆Petit aired from January 8 to March 25, 2020.

== Plot ==
The series follows a group of young girls who aspire to become hula dancers.

== Characters ==
Suzu (すず)
Voiced by: Haruka Yoshimura
Mona (モナ)
Voiced by: Suzuko Mimori
Fumi (ふみ)
Voiced by: Mikoi Sasaki
Nagisa (なぎさ)
Voiced by: Sarah Emi Bridcutt
Shiina (しいな)
Voiced by: Rikako Yamaguchi
Moe (もえ)
Voiced by: Moe Toyota
Miku (みく)
Voiced by: Miku Itō
Rei (れい)
Voiced by: Amami Kokumai
Natsu (なつ)
Voiced by: Non Harusaki
Kii (キイ)
Voiced by: Yukine Yaehata
Saya (さや)
Voiced by: Izumi Nanase
Emi (エミ)
Voiced by: Maho Taiga
Momo (もも)
Voiced by: Arisa Hirose
Rin (りん)
Voiced by: Yūka Hiyamizu
Migiwa (みぎわ)
Voiced by: Momoko Soyama
Kohara-sensei (小原先生)
Voiced by: Yurie Kobori
Chizu-sensei (千鶴先生)
Voiced by: Seiko Ueda

== Production and release ==
The series was announced on November 5, 2016, during a "Magical Hawaiians" event. The series will be directed by Yoshinori Asao and animated by Gaina. Character designs for the series are done by Ryōzō Ōminato. Ikoma is handling series composition, while F.M.F is composing the music. The series aired from January 11 to March 29, 2019, and broadcast on TV Tokyo, AT-X and FCT. It consisted of 5-minute episodes.

A spinoff series titled Hulaing Babies☆Petit aired from January 8 to March 25, 2020, with the cast and staff reprising their roles. The spinoff series consists of 80-second episodes.
