= Flaglia =

Japanese mixed-media project

- Created by: Madoka Takadono
- Anime television series

Flaglia: Natsuyasumi no Monogatari
- Directed by: Itsuro Kawasaki
- Written by: Madoka Takadono
- Studio: Gaina
- Licensed by: Amazon Prime Video (expired)
- Original network: Tokyo MX
- Original run: January 17, 2023 – January 31, 2023
- Episodes: 6

Flaglia (stylized in all caps) is a Japanese mixed-media project created by Madoka Takadono. A musical titled Flaglia The Musical: Yukite Kaerishi Monogatari ran from February 3–9 at the Nippon Seinenkan hall in Tokyo. A six-episode anime television series by Gaina titled Flaglia: Natsuyasumi no Monogatari aired in January 2023.

== Characters ==
Yuku
Voiced by: Jung Yoon-hak (credited as Yoonhak)
Adel
Voiced by: Yoshikuni Dōchin
Tagi
Voiced by: Mark Ishii
Ren
Voiced by: Junya Enoki
Mel
Voiced by: Takeo Ōtsuka
Kanchi
Voiced by: Seiichiro Yamashita
Tetsu
Voiced by: Yōhei Azakami
Silver
Voiced by: Shun'ichi Toki
Rabu
Voiced by: Yoshitaka Yamaya
Nitta
Voiced by: Eiji Takeuchi
Mythril
Voiced by: Katsunori Okai
Hasshu
Voiced by: Kensuke Nishi
Marie
Voiced by: Takuya Masumoto
Jango
Voiced by: Takugo Iwakawa
Iko
Voiced by: Hiromi Igarashi

== Media ==
=== Musical ===
A musical, titled Flaglia The Musical: Yukite Kaerishi Monogatari (FLAGLIA THE MUSICAL～ゆきてかえりし物語～) and taking place in a Middle Ages-like historical setting, ran from February 3–9 at the Nippon Seinenkan hall in Tokyo. The musical is directed by Tsuneyasu Tomoyoshi.

=== Anime ===
An anime series produced by Gaina, taking place in the present day, was announced alongside the musical on October 25, 2022. The anime, titled Flaglia: Natsuyasumi no Monogatari (FLAGLIA～なつやすみの物語～), is directed by Itsuro Kawasaki and written by Madoka Takadono. Original character designs are provided by Jiwataneho, while Eriko Itō adapts the designs for animation. The six-episode television series aired from January 17 to 31, 2023, on Tokyo MX. The anime's theme song "Here is" and the insert songs "Take Me Back" and "Talk About Us" are performed by The Boyz.
