= Date Kuninao =

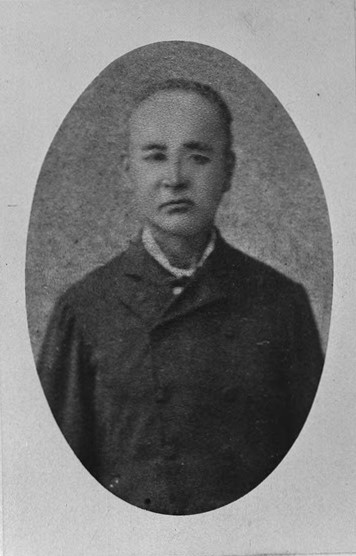

Date Kuninao (伊達 邦直; DAH-tay; November 2, 1834 – January 12, 1891) was a Japanese samurai of the late Edo period. The 10th head of the Date clan's Iwade-Date clan branch, Kuninao served as a retainer of Sendai han. After the Meiji Restoration, Kuninao went to Hokkaidō and assisted in land reclamation. Among various other contributions to the founding of modern Hokkaido, Kuninao planned what became the modern town of Tōbetsu.

== Notes ==
The emblem (mon) of the Date clan
