= Tsukidate, Fukushima =

Tsukidate 月舘町
- Former municipality
- Interactive map of Tsukidate
- Coordinates: 37.733°N 140.617°E
- Country: Japan
- Region: Tōhoku
- Prefecture: Fukushima Prefecture
- Merged: January 1, 2006 (now part of Date)

Area
  - Total: 43.63 km^{2} (16.85 sq mi)

Population (January 1, 2003)
  - Total: 4,443
  - Density: 101.83/km^{2} (263.7/sq mi)
- Time zone: UTC+09:00 (JST)
- Symbols
- Bird: Japanese bush warbler
- Flower: Golden-rayed lily
- Tree: Japanese zelkova

Tsukidate (月舘町, Tsukidate-machi) is one of five neighborhoods within the city of Date, Fukushima, along with the former towns of Date, Hobara, Ryozen, and Yanagawa. Until the merger in 2006 it was a town located in Date District, Fukushima Prefecture, Japan.

As of 2003, the town had an estimated population of 4,443, and a density of 101.83 persons per km^{2}. The total area is 43.63 km^{2}.

Tsukidate is primarily known for rice and wasabi cultivation. It is host to a hydrangea festival in Spring.

== History ==
Tsukidate Town Symbol

The town symbol was established in 1965. It includes a representation of the kanji "tsuki" (月), with the horizontal lines extended to indicate unlimited progress. In 1985, the golden-rayed lily, Japanese zelkova, and Japanese bush warbler were named the town's official flower, tree, and bird, respectively.

On January 1, 2006, Tsukidate, along with the towns of Date, Hobara, Ryōzen and Yanagawa (all from Date District), was merged to create Date.

== Local attractions ==
- Hana Koubo (resort and bathhouse)
- 16 Rakan Statues
- Tsukimidate Forest Park

== International relations ==
Since 1994, Tsukidate has been involved in a cultural exchange program with students from Revere, Massachusetts. Every two years, students from Tsukidate travel to the US for a week-long home-stay. On alternate years, those same students from Revere visit Tsukidate and stay in the student's homes. This program was expanded to include all of Date in 2006. In the summer of 2016, Date and Revere became sister cities. The program has been on hiatus since 2017.
