= Inawashiro Morikuni =

Japanese samurai

Inawashiro Morikuni (猪苗代 盛国, 1536 - ?) was a Japanese samurai of the Sengoku Period, who served the Date clan. He formerly served with the Ashina but he switched from the Ashina clan to the Date clan when Date clan invaded Mutsu Province.

In the Sendai domain's retainer structure, his family was classified as jun ichimon, with an income of 5,000 koku.
