= Hobara, Fukushima =

Hobara 保原町
- Former municipality
- Interactive map of Hobara
- Country: Japan
- Region: Tōhoku
- Prefecture: Fukushima Prefecture
- Merged: January 1, 2006 (now part of Date)

Area
  - Total: 41.99 km^{2} (16.21 sq mi)

Population (January 1, 2006)
  - Total: 24,491
  - Density: 583.25/km^{2} (1,510.6/sq mi)
- Time zone: UTC+09:00 (JST)
- Symbols
- Bird: the common cuckoo
- Flower: peach blossoms
- Tree: Japanese red pine

Hobara (保原町, Hobara-machi) is one of five neighborhoods within the city of Date, Fukushima, along with the towns of Date, Yanagawa, Ryozen, and Tsukidate. Until the merger of all five towns in 2006, Hobara was a town located in Date District, Fukushima Prefecture, Japan.

At that time, studies reported the town had an estimated population of 24,491 people and a density of 583.25 persons per km². The total area was 41.99 km².

== History ==
Hobara Town Symbol

The town's symbol was designed in 1957, mixing the katakana character for "ho," as in "Hobara" and the character for "en" or yen.

In 1960, the town of Hobara and the villages of Ooda, Kamihobara, Hashirazawa, and Tominari merged, retaining the name "Hobara."

In 1979, peach blossoms, the Japanese red pine, and the common cuckoo were designated the town's official flower, tree, and bird, respectively.

On January 1, 2006, Hobara, along with the towns of Date, Ryōzen, Tsukidate and Yanagawa (all from Date District), was merged to create Date City.

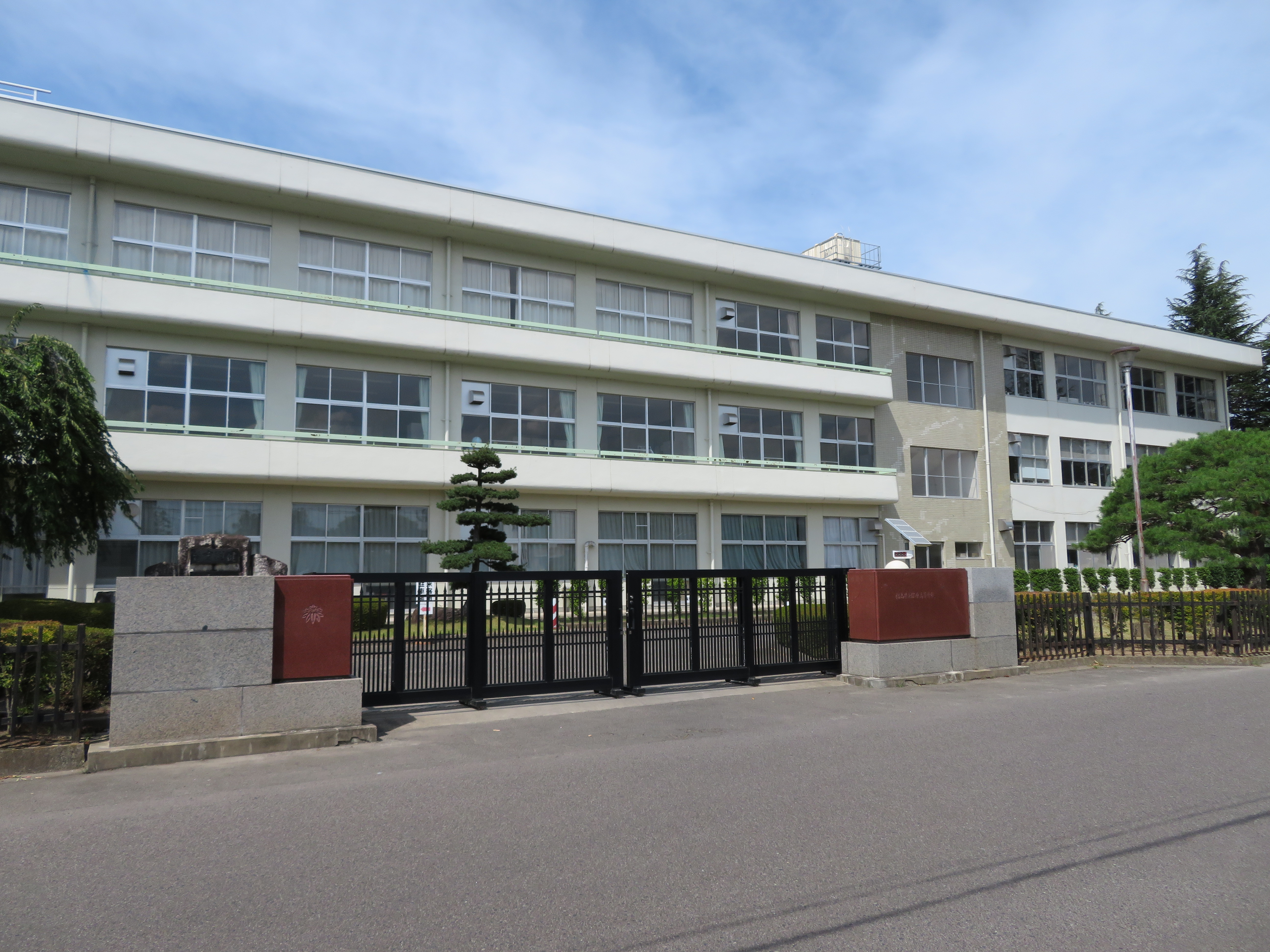
Hobara High School

== Education ==
- Hobara High School
- Shoyo Junior High School
- Hobara Elementary School
- Hashirazawa Elementary School
- Hobara Kindergarten
- Hobara Nursery School

== Transportation ==
=== Railway ===
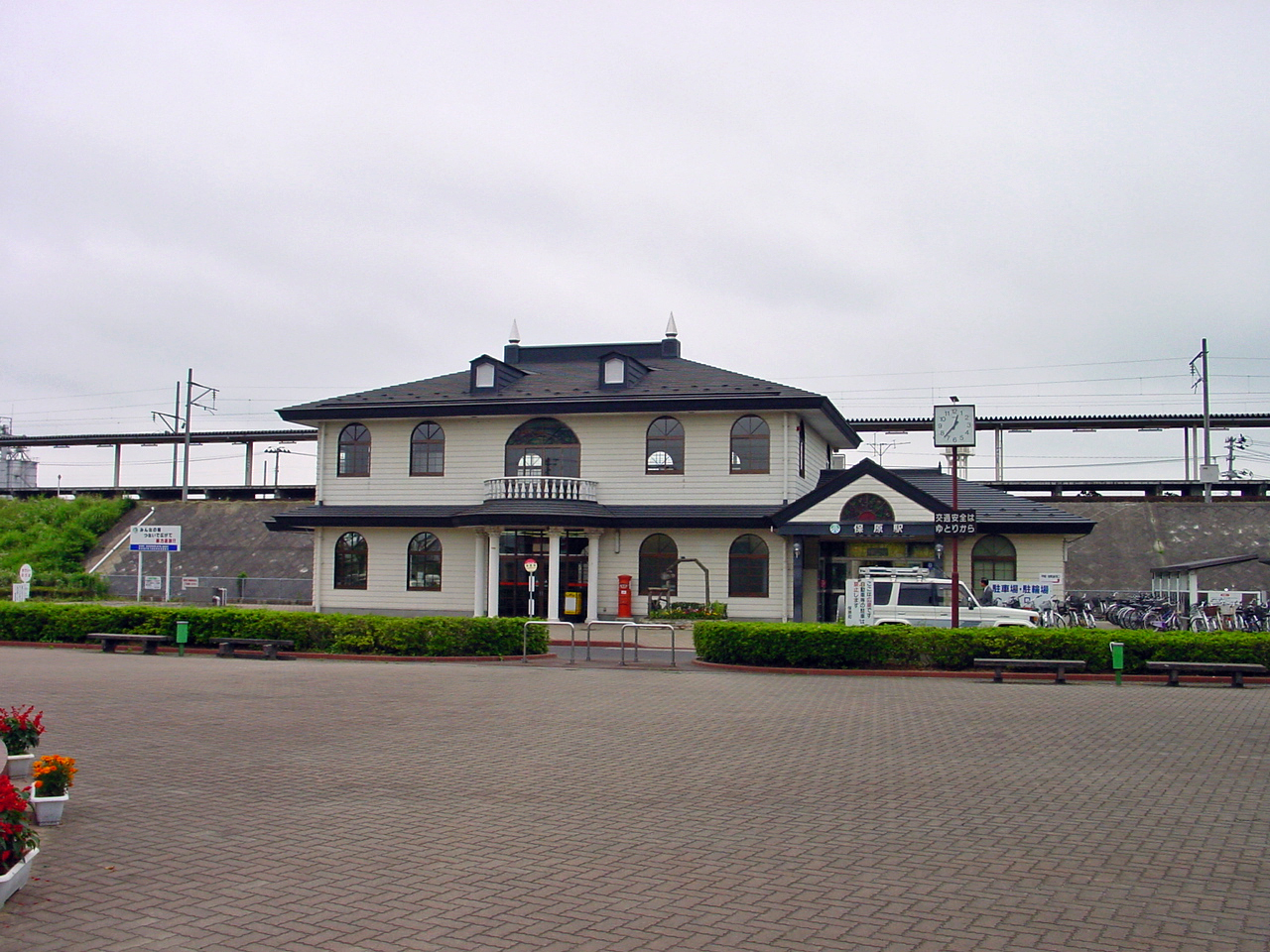
Hobara Station

AbukumaExpress – Abukuma Express Line

- Takako - Kamihobara - Hobara - Ōizumi - Niida

=== Highway ===
- National Route 349
- National Route 399

== Events ==
=== Tsutsuko-biki Festival ===
Tsutsuko-biki is a yearly festival that happens in Hobara on the first Sunday in March. Men from upper, lower, and central Hobara pull at three sides of a "tsutsuko" (meaning a "tawara" or straw bag) containing mochi. In the past, when the town market was held on the 5th and 10th of every month, this festival was held on January 24 to decide which section of the town would have the right to host the market.

Local legend states that the festival began when a severe famine broke out during the Kyōhō Era (1716-1736) in the mid-Edo Period. The lord of Yanagawa at that time, Matsudaira Michiharu (later known as Tokugawa Muneharu), gathered the locals and gave them rice seeds that provided a great harvest the following year. The event is a Shinto ritual of Itsukushima Shrine.

=== Momo Marathon ===
There is a yearly "Momo Marathon" (Peach Marathon) which passes through Hobara each summer.

== Folk Tales and Local Legends ==
=== Shinkeibo ===
Shinkeibo (真敬坊) was a Japanese monk who travelled through Hobara during a plague and was able to treat the villagers, saving them from their sickness. Shinkeibo was asked by the villagers to stay in the town permanently, but stories vary as to whether he resumed wandering or spent the rest of his life in Hobara. Shinkeibo is still considered a hero for his help.

=== Bomaka ===
Bomaka (ぼまか) is the name of a playful spirit that caused trouble to residents of Hobara for approximately one year. Little is known about him beyond his great power and mischievous nature.

=== Kamekyo ===
Kamekyo is the name of a spirit that resides in a local shrine, Itsukushima Shrine (厳島神社) in Hobara. Local legends include tales in which Kamekyo, a childlike spirit, plays with village children or helps villagers in times of famine or poverty.

== Local Foods ==
=== Mame Kojiru ===
Mame Kojiru (豆っこ汁) is a kind of bean used in making dango, a dumpling that is eaten both on its own and as an additive (in miso soup broth, for instance). Mame Kojiru is considered to be a creation native to Hobara.

== Local attractions ==
=== Takako Lake ===
A short walk from Takako Station, Takako Lake is located in Kamihobara's area of Takako. According to legend, when the area changed hands from the 17th lord of the Date Clan, Date Masamune to Toyotomi Hideyoshi, locals rushed to hide any trace of the local gold smelting works from the incoming rulers by submerging them in the lake. Alleged sightings of medieval millstones and other tools continued on into the Showa Period.

=== Takako's Twenty Scenic Views ===
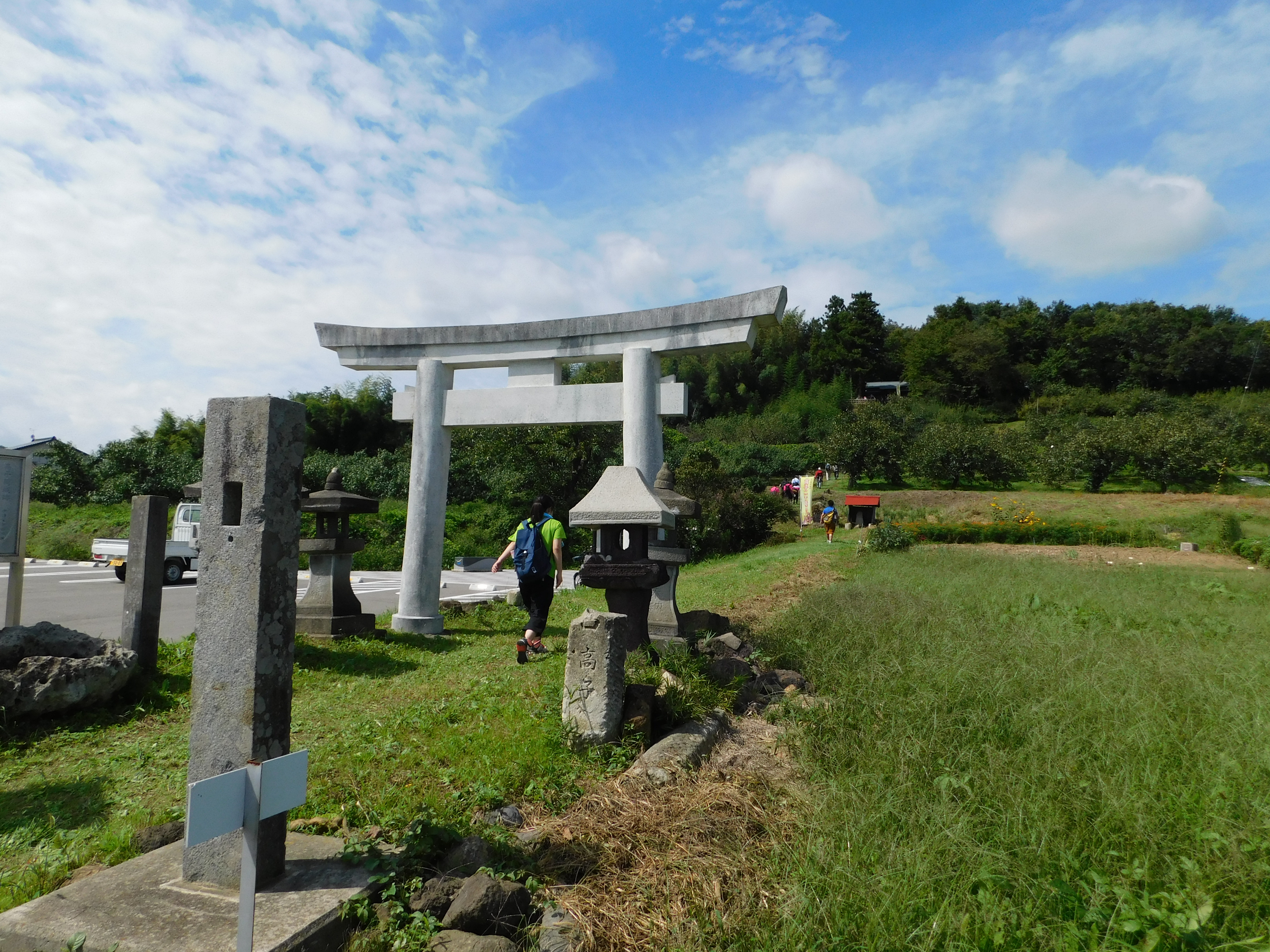
Entrance to Tanroban

The Takako Twenty Scenic Views (高子二十境 Takako Ni-juu Kyou) are twenty sites chosen and named by three generations of the Kumasaka family, who wrote kanshi poems in commemoration of each of these sites. These poems are inscribed on white land markers at each of the twenty sites. A guided tour of the twenty sites is held annually, featuring detailed explanations of each stop along the two courses offered (8 km and 6 km) as well as performances of local folk songs and a raffle in which anyone who participates may be rewarded with locally grown grapes.

The Twenty Scenic Views include:

1. Tanroban (丹露盤 "Red Rock of Dew")
2. Gyokutogan (玉兎巖 "Moon Hare Rock")
3. Chōshōrei (長嘯嶺 "Recitation Ridge")
4. Ryuusekigan (龍脊巖 "Dragon's Back")
5. Saishigai (彩芝崖 "Herb Gatherer's Cliff")
6. Kiunkutsu (帰雲窟 "Cloud's Cave")
7. Shoukihan (将帰阪 "Home Coming Hill")
8. Rishukō (狸首岡 "Badger Hill")
9. Insen (隠泉 "Hidden Spring")
10. Kōshihi (高子陂 "Takako Lake")
11. Fukiō (不羈拗 "Freedom Basin")
12. Jūsuigai (拾翆崖 "Jade Picker's Cliff")
13. Henshōgen (返照原 "Sundance Meadow")
14. Sōmarei (走馬嶺 "Galloping Horse Ridge")
15. Hakurohō (白鷺峰 "White Heron Peak")
16. Uzan (雩山 "Rain Dance Mountain")
17. Ufuzan (禹父山 "Pioneer's Hill")
18. Gukōkoku (愚公谷 "Old Fool's Valley")
19. Haku'undou (白雲洞 "White Cloud Cave")
20. Koshōkyuu (古樵丘 "Old Logger Hill")

Also referred to as Takakogaoka-kan or "Takakogaoka Hall," Tanroban, the first of the Takako Twenty Scenic Views is also the former site of a castle built by Date Tomomune. This was the first structure built by Tomomune upon arriving in Date. As such, it is considered the founding place of the Date Clan. At the mountain peak is the Kameoka Hachimangu Shrine. The shrine's white torii gate stands at the foot of the site.

=== Others ===
- The Former Kameoka Family Home
- Hobara History and Culture Museum
- Hobara Total Park
- Tōkō Temple
- Beniya Ridge
- Chin-chin Train and Winter Illumination
