= Date, Fukushima =

Date 伊達市
- City
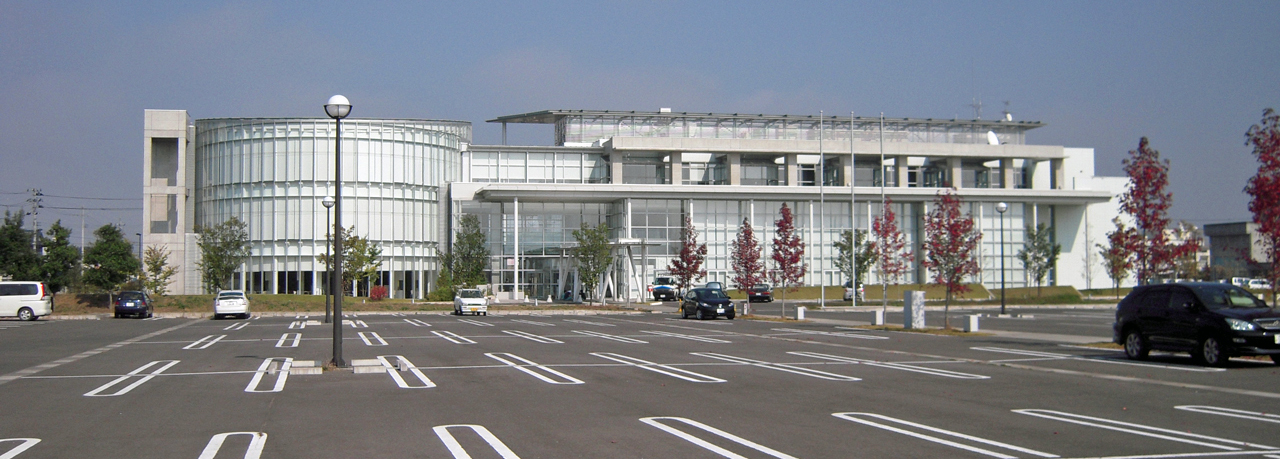
- Date City Hall

- Flag Seal

- Location of Date in Fukushima Prefecture

- Coordinates: 37°49′8.9″N 140°33′46.7″E
- Country: Japan
- Region: Tōhoku
- Prefecture: Fukushima

Area
  - Total: 265.12 km^{2} (102.36 sq mi)

Population (May 31, 2020)
  - Total: 59,625
  - Density: 224.90/km^{2} (582.48/sq mi)
- Time zone: UTC+9 (Japan Standard Time)
- Phone number: 024-575-2570
- Address: 180 Hobaramachi aza Funabashi, Date-shi, Fukushima-ken 960-0692
- Climate: Cfa
- Website: Official website
- Symbols
- Bird: Wagtail
- Flower: Peach
- Tree: Pinus densiflora

Date (伊達市, Date-shi; [date]) is a city in Fukushima Prefecture, Japan. As of 1 January 2026, the city had an estimated population of 55,004 in 23,314 households and a population density of 219 persons per km^{2}. The total area of the city was 265.10 square kilometres (102.36 sq mi).

== Geography ==
Date occupies the eastern half of the Fukushima Basin in northern Fukushima prefecture, with Miyagi Prefecture on its northern border. The area was once noted for sericulture but transitioned to fruit cultivation during the Taishō period. It is currently organized into the five former towns of Date, Hobara, Yanagawa, Ryozen, and Tsukidate, each of which retain numerous unique traditions and events. Hobara is the central area, where the municipal government is based.

- Rivers: Abukuma River, Hirose River

=== Neighboring municipalities ===
Fukushima Prefecture

- Fukushima
- Iitate
- Kawamata
- Kunimi
- Koori
- Sōma

Miyagi Prefecture

- Marumori
- Shiroishi

=== Climate ===
Date has a humid climate (Köppen climate classification Cfa). The average annual temperature in Date is 12.8 °C (55.0 °F). The average annual rainfall is 1,227 mm (48.3 in) with September as the wettest month. The temperatures are highest on average in August, at around 25.5 °C (77.9 °F), and lowest in January, at around 1.4 °C (34.5 °F).

Climate data for Yanagawa, Date (elevation 43 m, 1991–2020 normals, extremes 1976–present)
Month	Jan	Feb	Mar	Apr	May	Jun	Jul	Aug	Sep	Oct	Nov	Dec	Year
Record high °C (°F)	16.6 (61.9)	21.5 (70.7)	25.4 (77.7)	32.3 (90.1)	36.2 (97.2)	36.8 (98.2)	39.9 (103.8)	40.0 (104.0)	37.4 (99.3)	32.6 (90.7)	26.0 (78.8)	20.9 (69.6)	40.0 (104.0)
Mean daily maximum °C (°F)	5.9 (42.6)	7.2 (45.0)	11.2 (52.2)	17.7 (63.9)	23.0 (73.4)	25.7 (78.3)	28.9 (84.0)	30.4 (86.7)	26.2 (79.2)	20.6 (69.1)	14.6 (58.3)	8.7 (47.7)	18.3 (64.9)
Daily mean °C (°F)	1.3 (34.3)	2.0 (35.6)	5.2 (41.4)	10.9 (51.6)	16.4 (61.5)	20.1 (68.2)	23.7 (74.7)	24.9 (76.8)	20.9 (69.6)	14.8 (58.6)	8.6 (47.5)	3.6 (38.5)	12.7 (54.9)
Mean daily minimum °C (°F)	−3.0 (26.6)	−2.6 (27.3)	−0.4 (31.3)	4.6 (40.3)	10.3 (50.5)	15.5 (59.9)	19.8 (67.6)	21.0 (69.8)	16.7 (62.1)	9.9 (49.8)	3.2 (37.8)	−1.0 (30.2)	7.8 (46.0)
Record low °C (°F)	−12.6 (9.3)	−12.1 (10.2)	−10.2 (13.6)	−4.4 (24.1)	0.4 (32.7)	5.8 (42.4)	10.3 (50.5)	11.6 (52.9)	5.7 (42.3)	−1.7 (28.9)	−5.2 (22.6)	−16.2 (2.8)	−16.2 (2.8)
Average precipitation mm (inches)	49.9 (1.96)	33.0 (1.30)	64.1 (2.52)	75.1 (2.96)	83.0 (3.27)	109.4 (4.31)	159.2 (6.27)	143.9 (5.67)	158.4 (6.24)	123.4 (4.86)	53.2 (2.09)	41.5 (1.63)	1,095.4 (43.13)
Average precipitation days (≥ 1.0 mm)	7.9	6.5	8.2	8.0	8.9	10.8	13.2	10.7	11.0	8.7	6.7	8.1	108.3
Mean monthly sunshine hours	133.2	142.5	172.1	186.6	192.0	145.5	135.6	157.3	127.1	132.0	127.6	119.2	1,765.3
Source: Japan Meteorological Agency (1991–2020 normals, extremes 1976–present)

== Demographics ==
Per Japanese census data, the population of Date has declined over the past 70 years.

Historical population
Year	Pop.	±%
1950	80,527	—
1960	76,361	−5.2%
1970	73,767	−3.4%
1980	74,186	+0.6%
1990	74,200	+0.0%
2000	71,817	−3.2%
2010	66,027	−8.1%
2020	58,240	−11.8%

== History ==
A whole body skeleton of Paleoparadoxia was excavated in Yanagawa on August 21, 1984. The skeleton is named the "Yanagawa Specimen". The first humans to live within the bounds of present-day Date City are thought to have arrived during the Paleolithic period. The area was part of ancient Mutsu Province. Towards the end of the Heian period, Shinobu-gun (present day Fukushima City) and Date-gun (encompassing not only present day Date, but also Koori Town to the North and Kawamata Town to the South) were awarded to Date Tomomune. Tomomune founded the Date clan in present-day Hobara. The 17th lord of the Date Clan, Date Masamune lost control of the area and went on to found the Sendai Clan and the City of Sendai. The clan continued to rule over the Sendai Domain during the Edo period. However, under the Edo period Tokugawa shogunate, most of the area of Date was initially part of Yonezawa Domain, followed by Fukushima Domain and Yanagawa Domain before becoming tenryō territory under direct control of the shogunate. It was not part of the Date Clan's territories. After the Meiji Restoration, the area was organized as part of Nakadōri region of Iwaki Province.

As of 1889, at the time of the establishment of the modern municipalities system, the area consisted of 21 towns and villages. Between the years 1955 and 1960, these were consolidated into the five towns of Date (formerly the villages of Nagaoka and Fushiguro), Hobara (formerly the town of Hobara and the villages of Ooda, Kamihobara, Hashirazawa, and Tominari), Ryōzen (formerly the villages of Ryozen, Kakeda, Oguni, and Ishido), Tsukidate (formerly the villages of Ote and Otegawa), and Yanagawa (formerly the town of Yanagawa and the villages of Awano, Sekimoto, Shirane, Ooeda, Isazawa, Tomino, and Yamafunyuu), which merged to create the modern city of Date on January 1, 2006.

Date is about 60 kilometres (37 miles) north-west of Fukushima I Nuclear Power Plant, the site of the nuclear accident that followed the 2011 Tōhoku earthquake and tsunami. Although outside the nuclear accident exclusion zone, the levels of radiation in the city caused residents, and especially children, to remain indoors.

In 2016, an anime was produced in promotion of the city. Masamune Datenicle (政宗ダテニクル) features a young Date Masamune who meets a dragon deity that gives him the ability to call upon former leaders of the Date Clan.

== Government ==
Date has a mayor-council form of government with a directly elected mayor and a unicameral city legislature of 22 members. Date, together with the three municipalities of Date District, collectively contribute three members to the Fukushima Prefectural Assembly. In terms of national politics, the city is part of Fukushima 1st district of the lower house of the Diet of Japan.

== Economy ==
The economy of Date is primarily agricultural, with an emphasis on rice and horticulture. The area is noted for its peaches and dried persimmons.

Taiyo Yuden operates a metal power inductor production plant in the Yanagawa Industrial Zone in Date, Fukushima, which also produced CD, DVD and Blu-ray discs in the past.

=== Peaches ===
Date City's location in central Fukushima (Nakadōri), in the middle of Fukushima Basin, helps in the cultivation of peaches. The most common varieties grown in the area are Akatsuki, Kawanakajima, and Yuuzora.

=== Dried Persimmons ===
As sericulture lost its place in the area during the Taisho period, the former village of Isazawa in Yanagawa replaced it with the production of dried persimmons, among other industries. Dried persimmons had been produced in the area since the Edo period. However, the addition of sulfur fumigation as was used in the production of raisins in the United States, allowed for a much sweeter product. Whereas traditional dried persimmons, hoshigaki, have a tough skin and are almost black in color, those created with the additional step of sulfur fumigation, called anpogaki or tsurushigaki, are soft and bright orange.

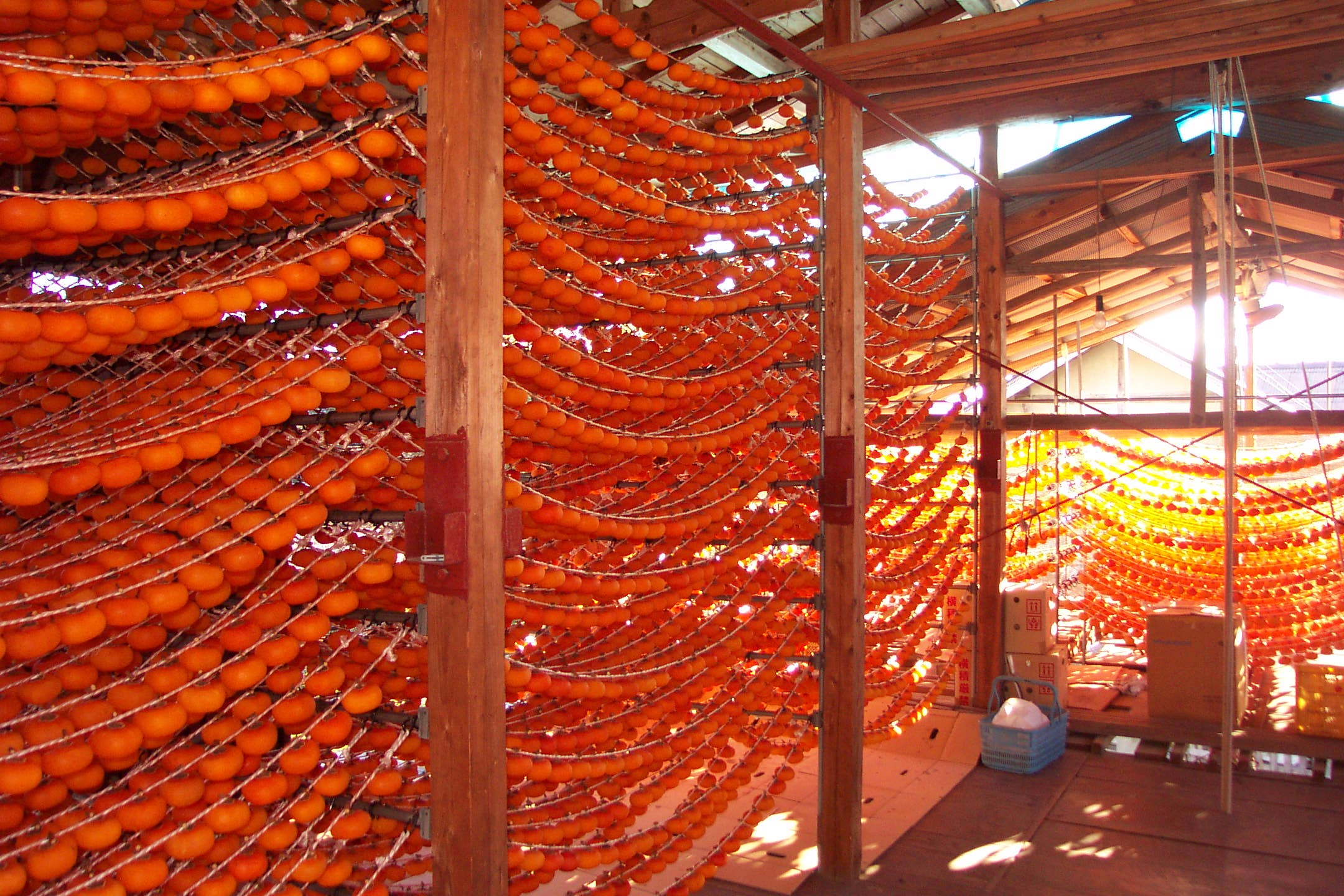
Anpogaki

Although the production of anpogaki was halted for three years after the 2011 disaster, Date City's persimmon orchards have since been decontaminated and testing machines have been installed, ensuring the safety of the final product.

== Education ==
Date City has twelve public elementary schools, six public junior high schools, one public high school, and one private high school:

Elementary Schools
Area	Public/Private	School
Date	Public	Date Elementary (伊達小学校)
Date	Public	East Date Elementary (伊達東小学校)
Yanagawa	Public	Yanagawa Elementary (梁川小学校)
Yanagawa	Public	Awano Elementary (粟野小学校)
Yanagawa	Public	Sekimoto Elementary (磧本小学校)
Hobara	Public	Hobara Elementary (保原小学校)
Hobara	Public	Ota Elementary (大田小学校)
Hobara	Public	Kamihobara Elementary (上保原小学校)
Hobara	Public	Hashirazawa Elementary (柱沢小学校)
Ryōzen	Public	Kakeda Elementary (掛田小学校)
Ryōzen	Public	~~Ishida Elementary (石田小学校)~~ permanently closed
Ryōzen	Public	Oguni Elementary (小国小学校)
Ryōzen	Public	~~Oishi Elementary (大石小学校)~~ permanently closed
Tsukidate	Public	Tsukidate Academy (月舘学園) formerly Tsukidate Elementary (月舘小学校)
Tsukidate	Public	~~Ōte Elementary (小手小学校)~~ permanently closed

Middle Schools
Area	Public/Private	School
Date	Public	Date Middle School (伊達中学校)
Yanagawa	Public	Yanagawa Middle School (梁川中学校)
Hobara	Public	Shōyō Middle School (松陽中学校)
Hobara	Public	Tōryō Middle School (桃陵中学校)
Ryōzen	Public	Ryōzen Middle School (霊山中学校)
Tsukidate	Public	Tsukidate Academy (月舘学園) formerly Tsukidate Middle School (月舘中学校)

High Schools
Area	Public/Private	School
Hobara	Public	Date High School（福島県立伊達高等学校） formerly Hobara High School (福島県立保原高等学校)
Yanagawa	Public	~~Yanagawa High School (福島県立梁川高等学校)~~ permanently closed
Date	Private	Seikō Gakuin High School (私立聖光学院高等学校)

== Festivals ==
=== Summer ===
==== Hobara ====
- Hobara Summer Festival

Held every year early to mid August, and features the Hobara Yoitoko Dance and Bon dance. Other specifics vary by year, but often include food stands from local vendors, various performances, and the Momo-Olympics where visitors can participate in various games to win prizes.

==== Tsukidate ====
- Otehime-no-sato Summer Festival

Held around mid-August, this festival feature fireworks, foodstalls and lanterns.

=== Autumn ===
==== Hobara ====
- Amaterasu Shinmeigu Shrine Autumn Festival

Held mid-October, local taiko groups form their own Taiko floats to perform around Jinya Street.

==== Ryōzen ====
- Ryōzen Shrine Fall Festival

=== Winter ===
==== Hobara ====
- Tsutsuko-biki Festival

Begun over 300 years ago, this festival is held every year at Itsukushima Shrine on the first Sunday of March. The main event is a three-way tug of war by men dressed solely in fundoshi and zori. After the winning team is decided, the men work together to lift and drop the heavy bundle repeatedly. This movement causes the hot mochi rice inside to form mochi, which is then passed out to the audience.

== Transportation ==
=== Railway ===
East Japan Railway Company (JR East) - Tōhoku Main Line

- Date

AbukumaExpress – Abukuma Express Line

- Takako - Kamihobara - Hobara - Ōizumi - Niida - Nitta - Yanagawa - Yanagawa Kibōnomori Kōen-mae - Tomino - Kabuto

=== Highway ===
- Tōhoku-Chūō Expressway
- National Route 4
- National Route 115
- National Route 349
- National Route 399

== Local attractions ==
- Mount Ryōzen, National Historic Site and National Place of Scenic Beauty
- Miyawaki temple ruins, National Historic Site
- Former Kameoka Family Home
- Ryōzen Shrine
- Takako Ni-juu Kyou,Created by Haryo Kumasaka. It features 20 selected scenic spots,Hobara,Date.
- site of Takakogaoka Castle, the original home of the Date Clan
- Takako Lake, one of Takako Ni-juu Kyou
- site of Yanagawa Castle, constructed by the Date Clan and once home to Date Masamune
- Yanagawa Hachiman Shrine, where Date Masamune prayed for victory in battle

== Notable people from Date ==
- Saitou Hikonai (斎藤彦内, 1709-1750) was a farmer and the leader of a peasants' revolt.
- Yahei Miura (弥平三浦, 1895-1971) was a long-distance runner and Olympic athlete.
- Seishiro Okazaki (January 28, 1890 – July 12, 1951) was a Japanese American healer, martial artist, and the founder of Danzan-ryū jujitsu. Born in the former village of Kakeda, he immigrated to Hawaii in 1906.

== International relations ==
- Sister cities with Revere, MA, United States, since August 2016
- 2020 Tokyo Olympics "Arigatou" Host Town for the Republic of Guyana as of August, 2019
