= Andō Nukari =

- 安藤 野雁

Personal details
- Born: Kitamura Shinbē Masayoshi (北村 新兵衛 政美); April 13, 1815 Kōri, Mutsu Province, Japan
- Died: April 28, 1867 (aged 52)

Andō Nukari (Japanese: 安藤 野雁; 1815–1867) was a wandering Japanese scholar of kokugaku who specialized in the study of the Man'yōshū.

== Biography ==
Andō Nukari was born in Kōri to Kitamura Shinbē (北村 新兵衛), the foreman of the Handa silver mine (半田銀山). Andō's father died when he was young, and he was adopted by the samurai Teranishi Takamoto.

Andō later studied under Takamoto's son and local daikan Teranishi Motoe. In 1841, he travelled to Edo to study kokugaku and waka under Hanawa Tadatomi, a son of Hanawa Hokiichi.

At the suggestion of Motoe, Andō and his wife moved to Hita in Bungo Province. Not long after the two arrived at their new house in Hita, Andō's wife died of illness and soon Motoe also died. After this, Andō became increasingly eccentric. Living in poverty, he was known to wear a single tattered kimono fastened with a rope. He would refuse shelter when offered it, and even during storms he would stand outside in the rain.

Andō's greatest work of scholarship was the Man'yōshū shinkō (萬葉集新考), a monumental commentary on the linguistics of the Man'yōshū, made up of 15–30 volumes in total. In the 1850s, while Andō was returning to Edo along the Nakasendō he encountered Ichioka Shigemasa, a noted kokugakusha of Nakatsugawa.

Andō died in 1867.
