= Kōri-Nishiyama Castle =

- 桑折西山城跡
- Koori, Fukushima Prefecture, Japan

Site information
- Type: hilltop-style Japanese castle
- Open to the public: yes
- Condition: ruins

Location
- Kōri-Nishiyama Castle Kōri-Nishiyama Castle (Japan)
- Coordinates: 37°51′17″N 140°30′28″E

Site history
- Built: 1532
- Built by: Date clan
- In use: Sengoku period
- Demolished: 1591

Kōri-Nishiyama Castle (桑折西山城跡, Kōri-Nishiyama-jō) was a Sengoku period Japanese castle located in what is now part of the town of Koori, northern Fukushima Prefecture, Japan. The site has been protected by the Japanese government as a National Historic Site since 1990.

== Background ==
Kōri-Nishiyama Castle is located on top of Mount Takadate, a 100-meter hill east of the center of the modern town of Koori where the geography forms a bottleneck connecting the Fukushima Basin with central Mutsu Province. In the modern period, the Tōhoku Shinkansen and Tōhoku Expressway follow the path of the ancient Ōshū Kaidō, passing just beneath the site of Kōri-Nishiyama Castle to exit Fukushima Prefecture.

== History ==
During the late Heian period, northern Japan was controlled by the Northern Fujiwara clan based at Hiraizumi. After the start of the Kamakura shogunate, Minamoto no Yoritomo led an army and defeated the Northern Fujiwara at the Battle of Koromo River in 1189. Afterwards, their territory was divided amongst Yoritomo's generals as spoils of war, and the Isa clan received what is now part of northern Fukushima Prefecture, A branch of the Isa clan relocated to this area, building Yanagawa Castle on the banks of the Abukuma River, and renamed themselves the Date clan. Following the fall of the Kamakura Shogunate in 1333, the Date pledged fealty to the Southern Court of Emperor Go-Daigo and accompanied Kitabatake Akiie on two expeditions to Kyoto; however, seeing the weakness of the Southern Court, the Date changed their allegiance nominally to the Muromachi shogunate, but in reality acted independently of outside control and expanded their territory to the west into the Yonezawa Basin and north into what is now southern Miyagi. In 1532, Date Tanemune relocated his seat from Yanagawa Castle to Kōri-Nishiyama Castle.

Tanemune's son, Date Harumune revolted against his father in 1542, protesting what he felt was a reckless policy of expansion and antagonizing the Date clan's powerful neighbors. Harumune seized Tanemune at Kōri-Nishiyama Castle, but he was rescued by his henchmen, and a civil war erupted in the Date territories. Harumune eventually prevailed, and moved the seat of the Date from Kōri-Nishiyama Castle to Yonezawa Castle in 1548, keeping Kōri-Nishiyama Castle to control the Fukushima Basin.

Harumune's son was the famous Date Masamune, who relocated from Yonezawa to Kurokawa Castle in Aizu. However, in 1591, Masamune submitted to Toyotomi Hideyoshi and was ordered to relocate his territories further north to Iwadeyama Castle. Kōri-Nishiyama Castle was abandoned at that time.

== Design of Kōri-Nishiyama Castle ==
Kōri-Nishiyama Castle was typical of Sengoku period mountain forts in that it consisted of several enclosures spread across a long and narrow ridge, utilising the natural terrain (the steep cliff and nearby cliff and nearby Ubugasawa River), as part of its defences. The castle extends over 600 meters of mountain ridges and consists of five enclosures protected by dry moats. The inner bailey is located in the center, and is roughly 100 meters long, and was protected by a simple clay walls. The main gate was to the west, where some remnants of clay and stone walls remain. The western enclosures are at a higher level, with the highest enclosure measuring 100 by 60 meters, separated into two sections. This may have been used as the inner bailey towards the end of the castle's history. At the southern end of this enclosure was a masugata-style gate.

At present, all of the structures of this castle are in ruins, and all that can be seen are some fragments of clay and stone walls and moats, and the layers of terraces on the mountaintop.

== See also ==
- List of Historic Sites of Japan (Fukushima)

== Literature ==
- Schmorleitz, Morton S. (1974). Castles in Japan. Tokyo: Charles E. Tuttle Co. pp. 144–145. ISBN 0-8048-1102-4.
- Motoo, Hinago (1986). Japanese Castles. Tokyo: Kodansha. p. 200 pages. ISBN 0-87011-766-1.
- Mitchelhill, Jennifer (2004). Castles of the Samurai: Power and Beauty. Tokyo: Kodansha. p. 112 pages. ISBN 4-7700-2954-3.
- Turnbull, Stephen (2003). Japanese Castles 1540-1640. Osprey Publishing. p. 64 pages. ISBN 1-84176-429-9.
