= Yanagawa, Fukushima =

Coordinates: 37.850°N 140.600°E

Yanagawa 梁川町
- Former municipality
- Interactive map of Yanagawa
- Country: Japan
- Region: Tōhoku
- Prefecture: Fukushima Prefecture
- Merged: January 1, 2006 (now part of Date)

Area
  - Total: 82.93 km^{2} (32.02 sq mi)

Population (January 1, 2003)
  - Total: 20,626
  - Density: 248.72/km^{2} (644.2/sq mi)
- Time zone: UTC+09:00 (JST)
- Symbols
- Bird: wagtail
- Flower: cherry blossom
- Tree: persimmon

Yanagawa (梁川町, Yanagawa-machi) is one of five neighborhoods within the city of Date, Fukushima, along with the former towns of Date, Hobara, Ryōzen and Tsukidate (all from Date District). Until 2006, it was an independent castle town located in Date District, Fukushima Prefecture, Japan.

As of 2003, the town had an estimated population of 20,626 and a density of 248.72 persons per km^{2}. The total area is 82.93 km^{2}.

== History ==
Yanagawa Town Symbol

Yanagawa was under the control of the Date Clan from 1189, when Date Tomomune received the land, until Date Masamune forfeited it to Toyotomi Hideyoshi in 1590. In 1598, the entire Fukushima Basin (Shintatsu Plain) became the territory of Uesugi Kagekatsu and Suda Nagayoshi became the lord of Yanagawa Castle.

By 1960, the town of Yanagawa had merged with the villages of Awano, Sekimoto, Shirane, Ooeda, Isazawa, Tomino, and Yamafunyuu. The town's symbol was established in 1965, and in 1983, cherry blossoms, persimmon trees, and wagtails were designated as the town's official flower, tree, and bird, respectively.

A whole body skeleton of Paleoparadoxia was excavated in Yanagawa on August 21, 1984. The skeleton is named the “Yanagawa Specimen”.

In 2006, Yanagawa merged with the towns of Date, Hobara, Ryōzen and Tsukidate, creating Date City.

== Transportation ==
=== Railway ===
AbukumaExpress – Abukuma Express Line

- Nitta - Yanagawa - Yanagawa Kibōnomori Kōen-mae - Tomino - Kabuto

=== Highway ===
- National Route 349

== Local Events and Attractions ==
=== Yanagawa Castle ===
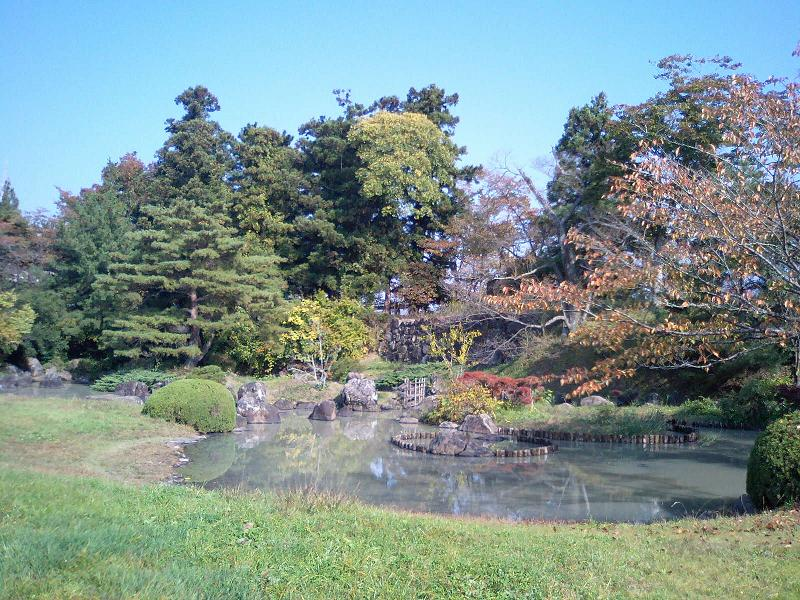
Shinji Pond

Yanagawa Castle was constructed in the Kamakura Period and used as the headquarters of the Date Clan from the time of the 11th lord of the Date Clan, Date Mochimune, through to that of the 14th lord, Date Tanemune. Mochimune's son, the 12th lord, Date Shigemune was influenced by Higashiyama Culture and built the inner garden, including Shinji Pond, which is still visible at the site today. The 17th lord of the Date Clan, Date Masamune stayed at Yanagawa Castle when the last member of the Date Clan to own the castle, Date Tessai Nyuudou resided there.

=== Summer Festival ===
Held in August, hundreds of people dress in yukata and parade down the main street, performing the local bon odori dance. This is followed by an address by the mayor, a series of performances, and a fireworks show.

=== Specialty Products ===
In 2019, a specialty product of Yanagawa, the "Niku goro to onigiri," was awarded first place among onigiri in the Bento and Prepared Meal Awards (お弁当・お惣菜大賞). It is prepared using local, "Date chicken" and only available at the Machi no Eki Yanagawa, a community center in the center of the town.
