= Date District, Fukushima =

District in Fukushima prefecture, Japan

Coordinates: 37.713360°N 140.565717°E

Location of Date District in Fukushima Prefecture

Date (伊達郡, Date-gun, DAH-tay) is a district located in Fukushima Prefecture, Japan.

As of 2020, the district has an estimated population of 32,268 and a density of 154.7 persons per km^{2}. The total area is 208.53 km^{2}.

== Towns and villages ==
- Kawamata
- Koori
- Kunimi

== Mergers ==
- On January 1, 2006 the towns of Date, Hobara, Ryōzen, Tsukidate and Yanagawa merged to create the city of Date.
- On July 1, 2008 the town of Iino was annexed by the city of Fukushima (excluding Kawamata).

== See also ==
- Date clan
