= Ōizumi Station (Fukushima) =

Railway station in Date, Fukushima Prefecture, Japan

Ōizumi Station 大泉駅
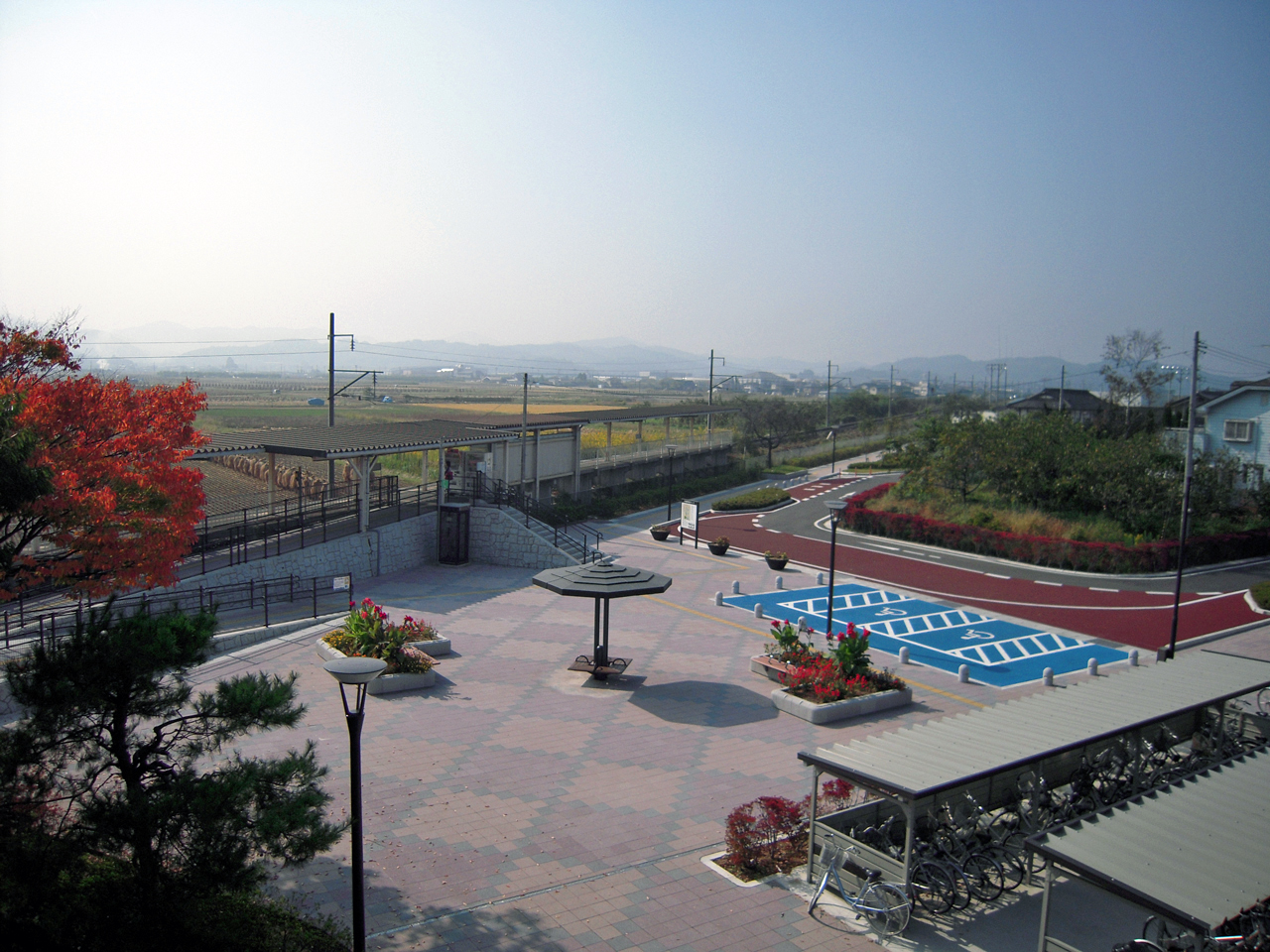
- Ōizumi Station, October 2008

General information
- Location: Ochiuchi Hobaramachi Ōizumi, Date-shi, Fukushima-ken 960-0634; Japan
- Coordinates: 37°49′12.33″N 140°34′0.78″E
- Line: ■ Abukuma Express Line
- Distance: 13.9 km from Fukushima
- Platforms: 1 side platform

Other information
- Status: Unstaffed
- Website: http://www.abukyu.co.jp/about/time-table/nobori/post-22.html

History
- Opened: July 1, 1988

Passengers
- FY2015: 270 (daily)
Location
- Location within Fukushima Prefecture Location within Japan

Ōizumi Station (大泉駅, Ōizumi-eki) is a railway station on the AbukumaExpress in the city of Date, Fukushima Japan.

== Lines ==
Ōizumi Station is served by the Abukuma Express Line, and is located 13.9 rail kilometres from the official starting point of the line at Fukushima.

== Station layout ==
Ōizumi Station has one side platform serving a single bi-directional track. There is no station building. The station is unattended.

== Adjacent stations ==
«	Service	»
Abukuma Express Line
Rapid: Does not stop at this station
Hobara	Local	Niida

== History ==
Ōizumi Station opened on July 1, 1988.

== Passenger statistics ==
In fiscal 2015, the station was used by an average of 270 passengers daily (boarding passengers only).

== Surrounding area ==
- Date City Hall
- Former Kameoka Family Home

== See also ==
- List of railway stations in Japan
