= Japan National Route 399 =

Road in Japan

National Route 399
- 国道399号
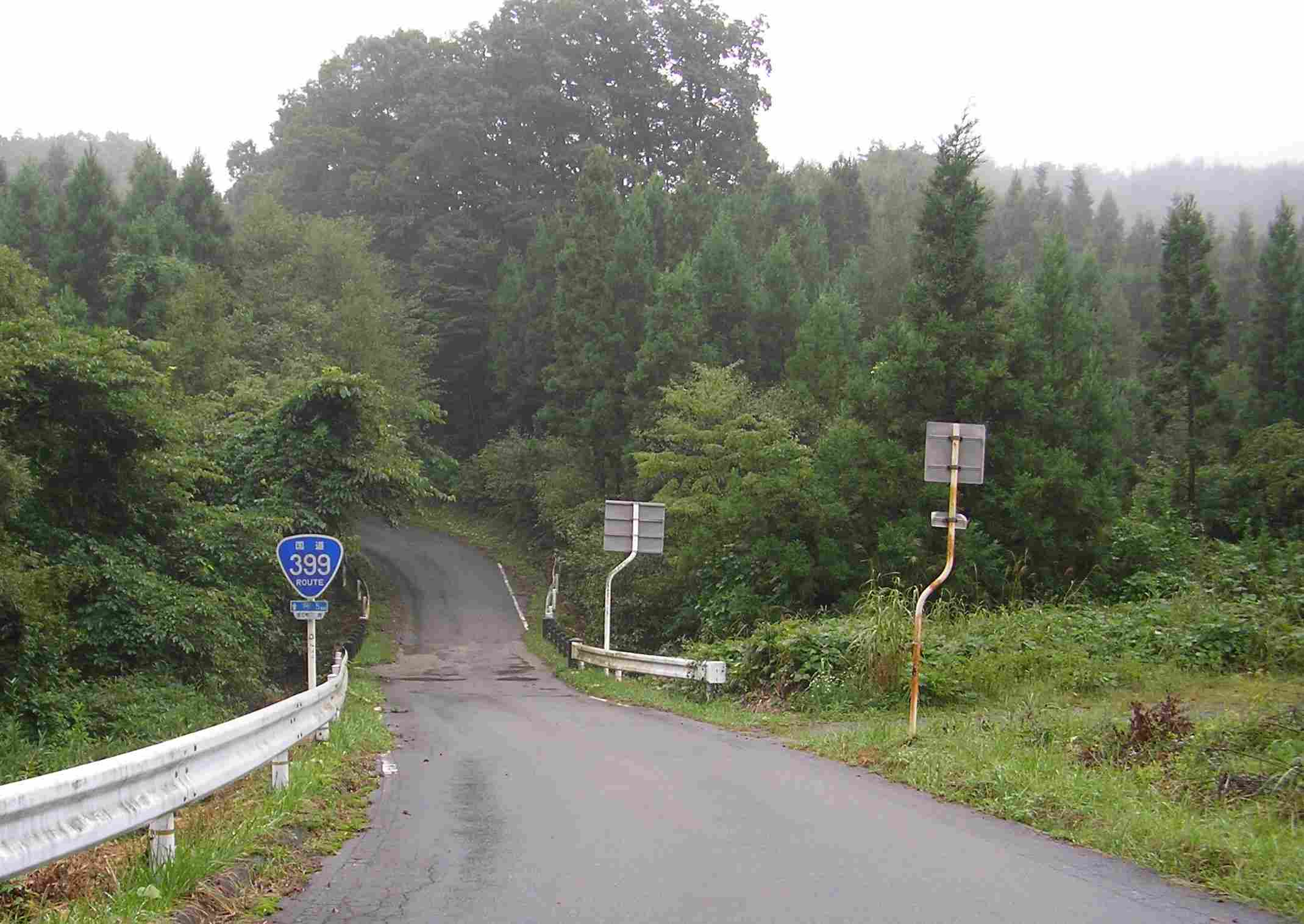

Route information
- Length: 179.4 km (111.5 mi)

Location
- Country: Japan

Highway system
- National highways of Japan; Expressways of Japan
← National Route 398	→ National Route 400

National Route 399 is a national highway of Japan connecting Iwaki, Fukushima and Nan'yō, Yamagata in Japan, with a total length of 179.4 km (111.5 mi).
