= Benten Film =

Japanese animation studio

Benten Film Co., Ltd.
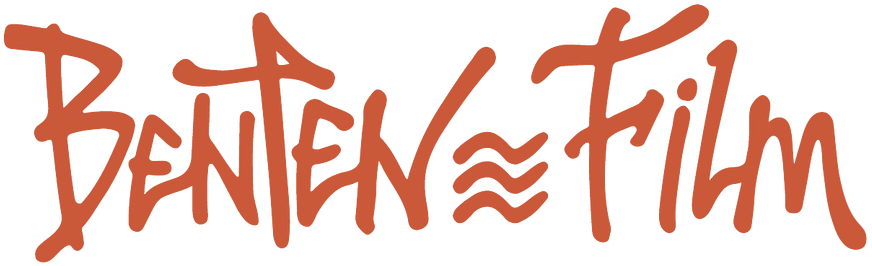
- Native name: 株式会社BENTEN Film
- Romanized name: Kabushiki-gaisha Benten Film
- Formerly: Fukushima Gainax Co., Ltd. (2015–2018); Gaina Co., Ltd. (2018–2025)
- Type: Private
- Predecessor: Gainax
- Founded: March 20, 2015; 11 years ago
- Headquarters: Kichjoji Honjo, Koganei, Tokyo, Japan
- Key people: Yoshinori Asao (president)
- Parent: Gainax (2015); Kinoshita Group Holdings (2018–2025); Creator's X (2025–present)
- Subsidiaries: Fukushima Gaina
- Website: bentenfilm.com

Benten Film Co., Ltd. (Japanese: 株式会社BENTEN Film, Hepburn: Kabushiki-gaisha Benten Film), formerly known as Gaina Co., Ltd. (Japanese: 株式会社ガイナ, Hepburn: Kabushiki-gaisha Gaina) from 2018 to 2025 and as Fukushima Gainax (Japanese: 福島ガイナックス, Hepburn: Fukushima Gainakkusu) from 2015 to 2018, is a Japanese animation studio subsidiary of Creator's X.

== History ==
In March 2015, Gainax established Fukushima Gainax, a new animation studio and museum, in a converted junior high school building in Miharu, Fukushima to take more overseas outsourcing work. The studio and museum were established to bring more tourism to the area in the wake of the Fukushima nuclear accident in 2011. In December 2015, Fukushima Gainax and Gainax became independent companies with no relation between each other besides the Gainax name, with the company starting their own projects later.

In September 2016, the company established a new subsidiary in Tokyo. In August 2018, it was announced that Fukushima Gainax had been acquired by Kinoshita Group Holdings on July 26, making it Kinoshita's new subsidiary. Fukushima Gainax changed its studio name to Gaina and relocated to Koganei, Tokyo on August 9, with its new parent company planning to make the new subsidiary a pillar of its anime production to expand its business.

In August 2025, Kinoshita Group Holdings sold Gaina to AI animation company Creator's X and Gaina changed its name to Benten Film.

== Works ==
=== TV series ===
- Forest of Piano (2018–2019)
- Hulaing Babies (2019)
- Hulaing Babies☆Petit (2020)
- Cap Revolution Bottleman DX (2022)
- The Yakuza's Guide to Babysitting (2022, with Feel)
- Hanabi-chan Is Often Late (2022)
- Flaglia (2023)
- Grendizer U (2024)
- Babanba Banban Vampire (2025)
- Petals of Reincarnation (2026)
- Red Riding Hood: A Detective Story (2027)

=== Original net animations ===
- Bridge for Future (2015)
- Masamune Datenicle (2016–2018)
- Omoi no Kakera (2016)
- Miharu no Amigo (2016)
- Kumo no Kanata (2017)
- Jinriki Senkan!? Shiokaze Sawakaze (2017)
- Tabechattate Ii no ni na! (2018)
- Aihime Megohime (2019–2021)
- Cap Revolution Bottleman (2020–2021)
