= Japan National Route 115 =

National highway in Japan

National Route 115
- 国道115号
- National Route 115 highlighted in red
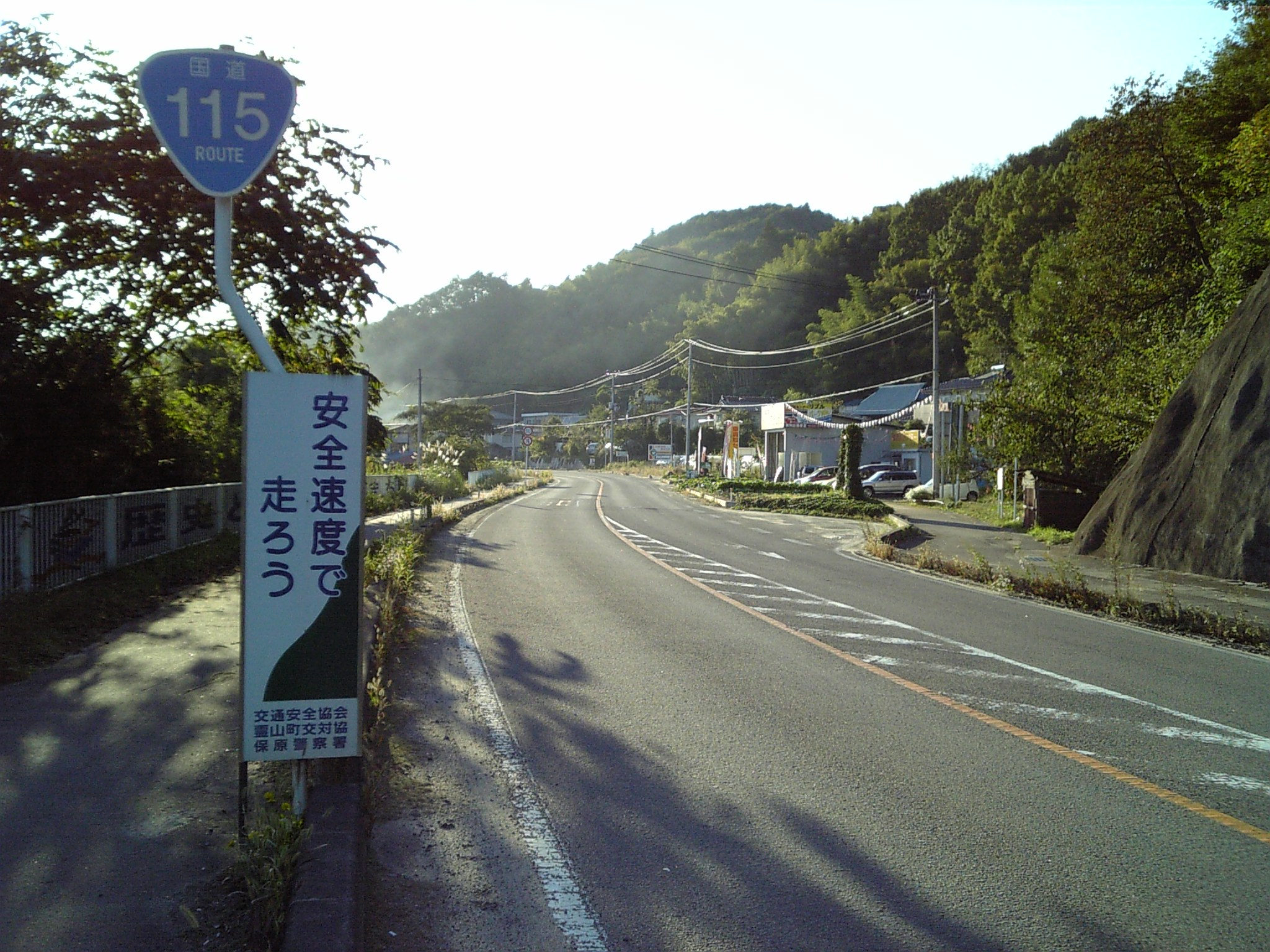

Route information
- Length: 109.7 km (68.2 mi)
- Existed: 1963–present

Major junctions
- South end: National Route 49 in Inawashiro, Fukushima
- National Route 349; Jōban Expressway; National Route 4; National Route 13; Tōhoku Expressway; National Route 459; Ban-etsu Expressway
- North end: National Route 6/Prefectural Road 38 in Sōma, Fukushima

Location
- Country: Japan

Highway system
- National highways of Japan; Expressways of Japan
← National Route 114	→ National Route 116

National Route 115 is a national highway of Japan connecting Sōma, Fukushima and Inawashiro, Fukushima in Japan, with a total length of 109.7 km (68.16 mi).

== History ==
Route 115 was originally designated on 1 April 1953 from Hirashima to Niigata. This was redesignated as Route 49 on 1 April 1963 and the current Route 115 was designated the same day.
