= Koori, Fukushima =

Koori 桑折町
- Town
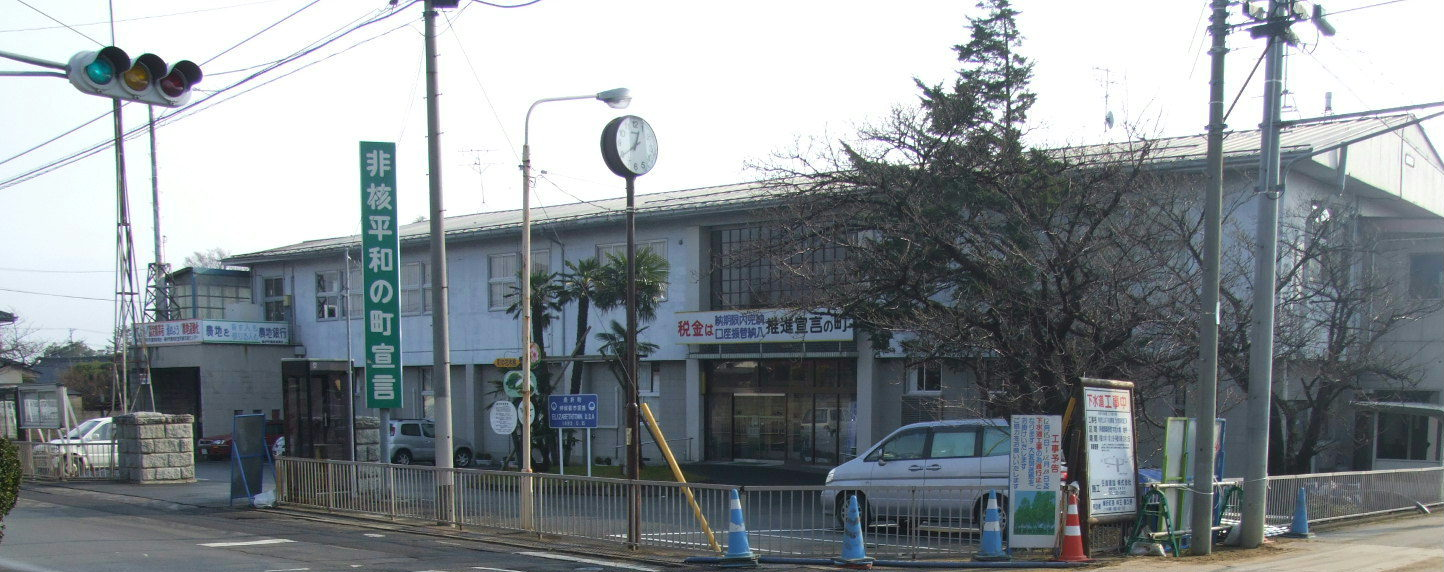
- Koori Town Hall

- Flag Seal

- Location of Koori in Fukushima Prefecture

- Coordinates: 37°50′58″N 140°30′59″E
- Country: Japan
- Region: Tōhoku
- Prefecture: Fukushima
- District: Date

Area
  - Total: 42.97 km^{2} (16.59 sq mi)

Population (April 2020)
  - Total: 11,679
  - Density: 271.8/km^{2} (703.9/sq mi)
- Time zone: UTC+9 (Japan Standard Time)
- Tree: Torreya nucifera, Pinus densiflora
- Flower: Peach
- Bird: Common cuckoo
- Phone number: 024-582-2111
- Address: Higashi Osumi 18 Koori-machi, Date-gun, Fukushima-ken 969-1611
- Website: Official website

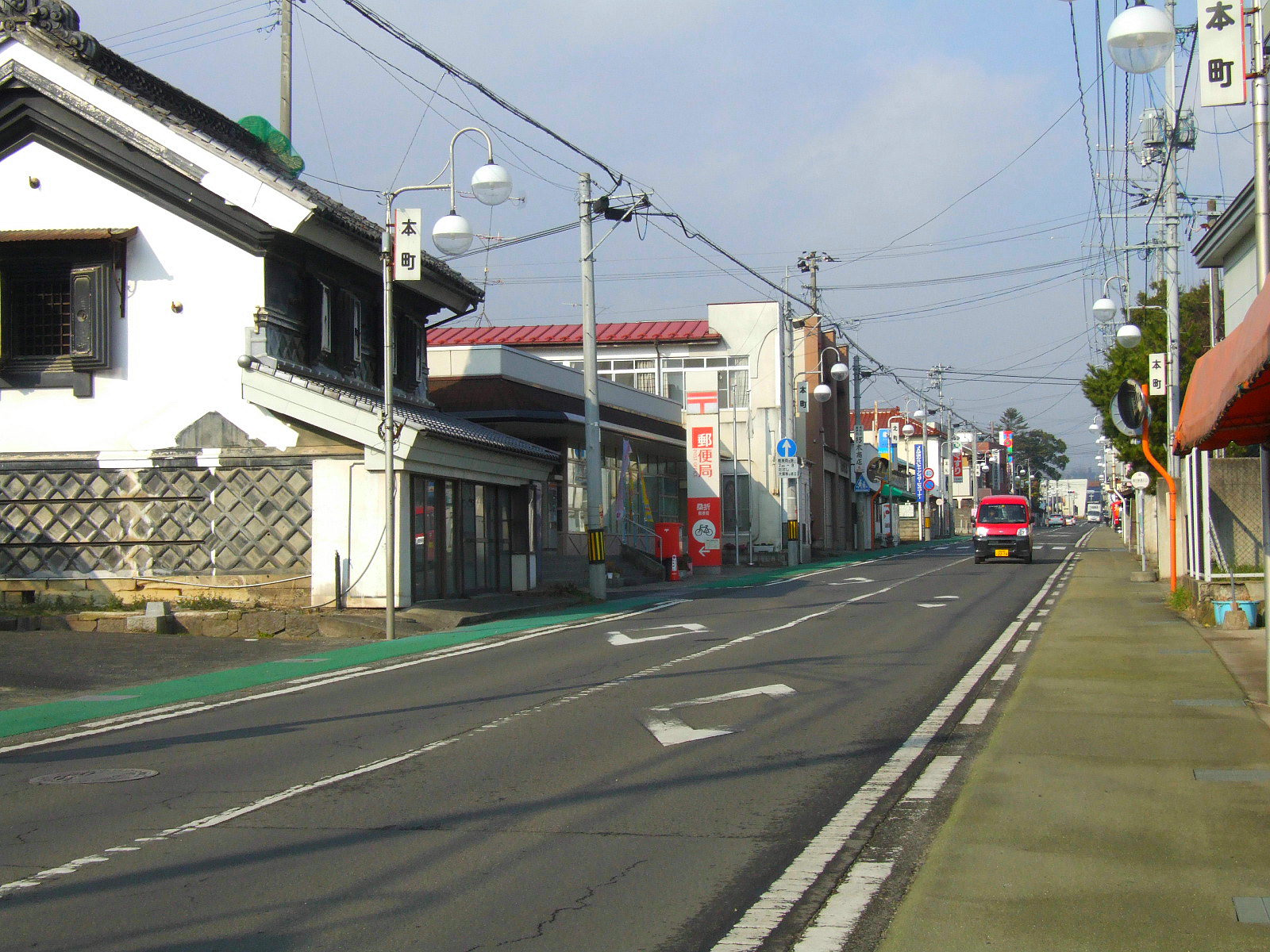
Koori Post Office on the former Ōshū Kaidō

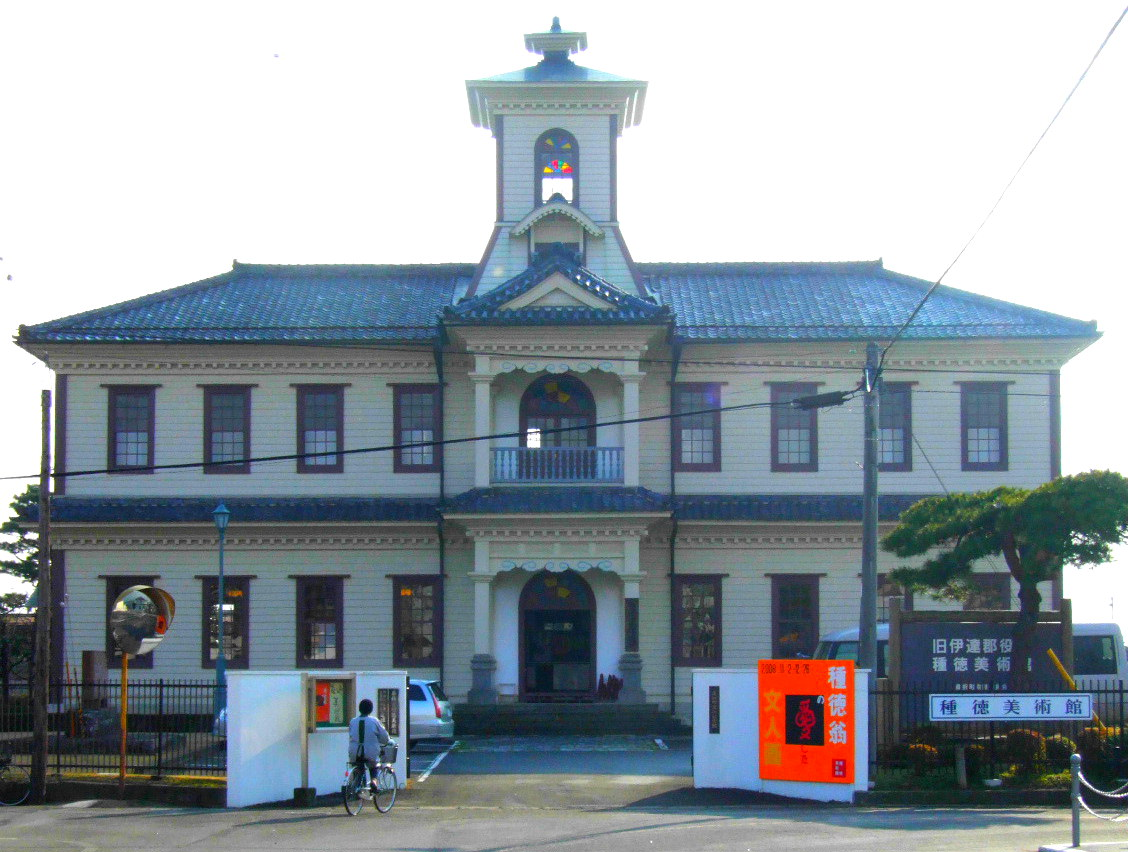
former Date District Office

Koori (桑折町, Koori-machi) is a town located in Fukushima Prefecture, Japan. As of 1 April 2020, the town had an estimated population of 11,679 in 4599 households, and a population density of 270 persons per km^{2}. The total area the town was 42.97 square kilometres (16.59 sq mi).

== Geography ==
Kōri is located in the northern Fukushima Basin on the northern border of Fukushima prefecture with Miyagi Prefecture. The northwestern half of the town is mountainous and hilly, and the eastern and southern portions of the town are in the Fukushima Basin along the Abukuma River, which runs through the southeast of the town. There is Mount Handa (865 meters) is to the northwest of the town.

- Rivers: Abukuma River

=== Neighboring municipalities ===
- Fukushima Prefecture
  - Date
  - Fukushima
  - Kunimi
- Miyagi Prefecture
  - Shiroishi

== Demographics ==
Per Japanese census data, the population of Koori peaked around the year 1950 and has been in decline since. It is now less than it was a century ago.

Historical population
Year	Pop.	±%
1920	12,550	—
1930	13,306	+6.0%
1940	13,746	+3.3%
1950	17,703	+28.8%
1960	15,814	−10.7%
1970	14,723	−6.9%
1980	14,901	+1.2%
1990	14,692	−1.4%
2000	13,700	−6.8%
2010	12,853	−6.2%
2020	11,459	−10.8%

== Climate ==
Koori has a humid subtropical climate (Köppen climate classification Cfa). The average annual temperature in Koori is 12.5 °C (54.5 °F). The average annual rainfall is 1,233 mm (48.5 in) with September as the wettest month. The temperatures are highest on average in August, at around 25.4 °C (77.7 °F), and lowest in January, at around 0.9 °C (33.6 °F).

== History ==
The area of present-day Koori was part of ancient Mutsu Province. During the Edo period, it was tenryō territory under direct control of the Tokugawa shogunate and was the site of a daikansho as well as a post station on the Ōshū Kaidō and the Hasshu Kaidō highways. After the Meiji Restoration, it was organized as part of Nakadōri region of Iwaki Province. The town of Koori was created on April 1, 1889 with the creation of the modern municipalities system. It annexed the neighboring villages of Mutsuai, Danzaki and Handa on March 31, 1954.

== Economy ==
The economy of Kōri is primarily agricultural, and is famous for production of fruit, notably peaches. It is a satellite city of the prefectural capital, Fukushima.

== Culture ==
Kōri's only museum, Shutoku Museum of Art, has been closed since 2021 due to an earthquake.

== Education ==
Kōri has four public elementary schools and one public junior high school operated by the town government. The town has one private high school, but no public high schools.

== Transportation ==
=== Railway ===
JR East – Tōhoku Main Line

- Koori

=== Highway ===
- Tōhoku Expressway – Koori Junction
- Tōhoku-Chūō Expressway – Koori Junction
- National Route 4

== Local attractions ==
- Kōri-Nishiyama Castle ruins, a National Historic Site
- former Date District Office, a National Important Cultural Property

== International relations ==
Mazie Hirono (D-HI), an U.S. Senator from Hawaii since 2013, was born in Koori. Animator and director Akiyuki Shinbo was also born in Koori.

Koori is twinned with following town(s):

- (United States) - Elizabethtown, Kentucky, USA since May 15, 1992

== Notable people ==
- Andō Nukari
