= Hobara Station =

Railway station in Date, Fukushima Prefecture, Japan

Hobara Station 保原駅
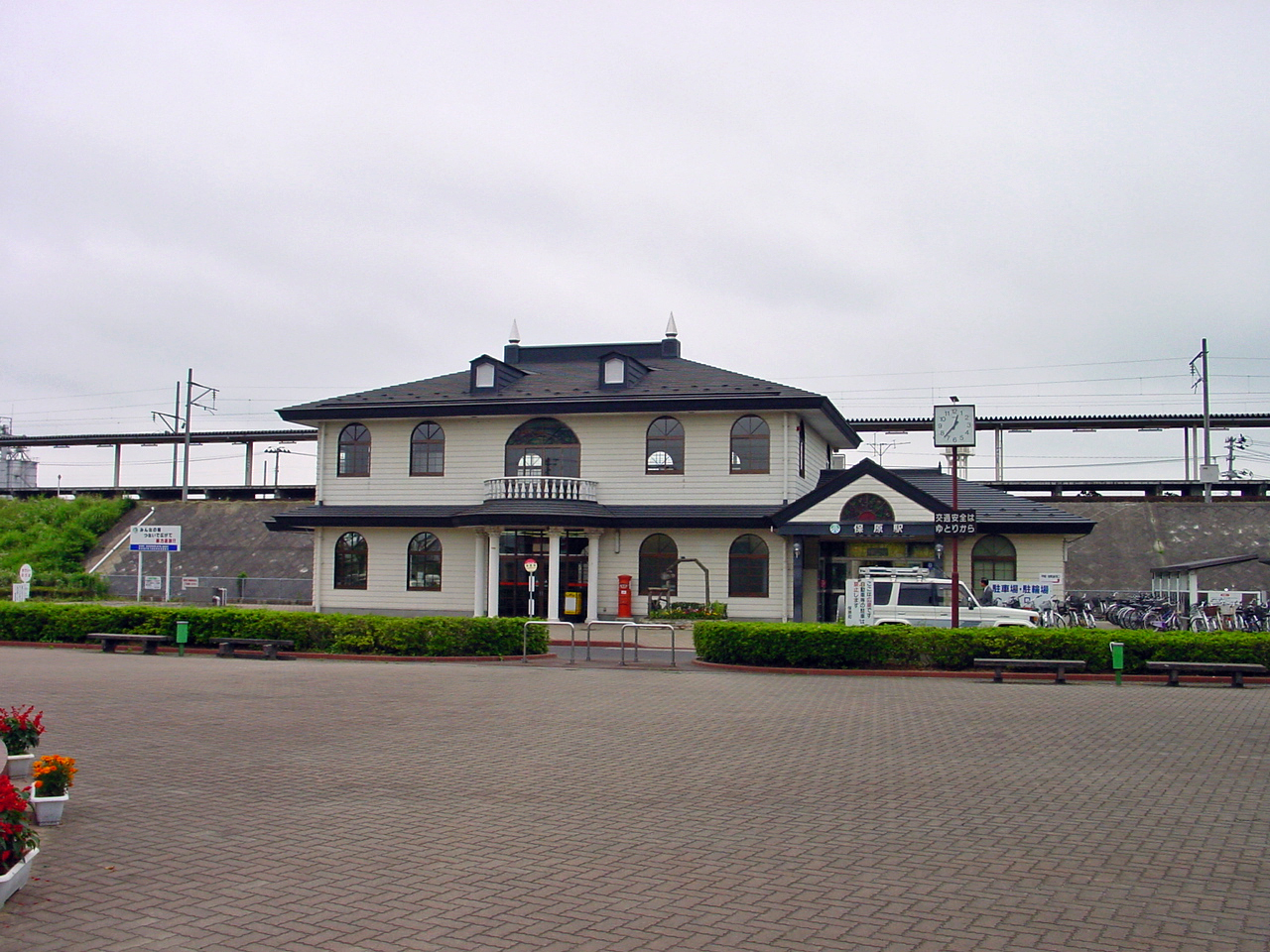
- Hobara Station, July 2003

General information
- Location: Hobara Higashinozaki, Date-shi, Fukushima-ken 960-0600; Japan
- Coordinates: 37°48′48.53″N 140°33′22.5″E
- Operator: AbukumaExpress
- Line: ■ Abukuma Express Line
- Distance: 12.8 km from Fukushima
- Platforms: 1 island platform

Other information
- Status: Staffed
- Website: http://www.abukyu.co.jp/about/time-table/nobori/post-21.html

History
- Opened: July 1, 1988

Passengers
- FY2015: 544 (daily)
Location
- Location within Fukushima Prefecture Location within Japan

Hobara Station (保原駅, Hobara-eki) is a railway station on the AbukumaExpress in the city of Date, Fukushima Japan. It was opened July 1, 1988. It is under the jurisdiction of Ministry of Land, Infrastructure, Transport and Tourism's Tohoku Regional Transport Bureau.

== Lines ==
Hobara Station is served by the Abukuma Express Line, and is located 12.8 rail kilometres from the official starting point of the line at Fukushima.

== Station layout ==
Hobara Station has a single island platform. The station is staffed.

Inside, there is a large waiting room and a shop selling local products and goods related to Date City's promotional anime Masamune Date ni Kuru.

== Adjacent stations ==
«	Service	»
Abukuma Express Line
Rapid: Does not stop at this station
Kamihobara	Local	Ōizumi

== History ==
Hobara Station opened on July 1, 1988.

In 2002, it was chosen to be one of 100 stations representing the Tōhoku region.

== Passenger statistics ==
In fiscal 2015, the station was used by an average of 544 passengers daily (boarding passengers only).

== Surrounding area ==
- Hobara Post Office
- National Route 349

== See also ==
- List of railway stations in Japan
