= Tikashi Fukushima =

Japanese born Brazilian painter and printmaker

- Born: May 19, 1920; Sōma, Fukushima, Japan
- Died: October 14, 2001 (aged 81)
- Occupations: Painter, printmaker
- Spouse: Ai Saito

Tikashi Fukushima (Sōma, January 19, 1920 - São Paulo, October 14, 2001) was a Japanese-Brazilian painter and printmaker. Considered one of the most important abstractionists in Brazil, Fukushima also produced several works in the field of figurativism throughout his career. The artist has received various positive reviews from numerous important art critics for both his abstractionist and figurative productions. Fukushima belongs to the pre-war immigrant generation, composed of common immigrants who, after several changes in their lives, awakened to the arts. His master was Tadashi Kaminagai, whom Fukushima saw as a mentor, but who had a different style of painting than the one he later developed. Tikashi's works have been presented in national and international exhibitions.

Fukushima participated in artistic groups, such as Seibi-kai and Grupo Guanabara, having contact with numerous painters, including many of Japanese origin. The artist was honored with multiple titles and awards, and many of his works were acquired by important collectors in Brazil and other countries. In addition, he was a member of the Arts Commission of the Brazil-Japan Fine Arts Foundation, president of the Arts Commission of the Brazilian Society of Japanese Culture, and president of the Japanese-Brazilian Art Museum. He also received the decoration called the Order of the Sacred Treasure, in 1997.

== Biography ==
=== Early years ===
In his youth, Fukushima worked on a farm and in a warehouse. He finished high school and moved to Yokohama, near Tokyo, where he was a draftsman in an airplane factory for two years. Based on reports from his uncle who had already been to Brazil, he decided to change countries on February 24, 1940, aboard the ship Brasil Maru. Thus, he disembarked in the port of Santos and went to the countryside of the state of São Paulo, first to Pompeia and then to Lins, where he met Manabu Mabe. Mabe was four years younger than Tikashi, and both were determined to be painters; Mabe worked in the fields and painted when it rained.

Tikashi began working in a warehouse and in his free time devoted himself to drawing, making copies from photographs, and this activity provided him with an extra income. In 1945, living in São Paulo and working in a workshop, he was introduced by his boss to a well-known painter, Tadashi Kaminagai, who at that time needed an assistant in a frame workshop in Rio de Janeiro. Thus, Fukushima agreed to work for Kaminagai and in 1946 he moved to Santa Teresa, Rio de Janeiro.

Fukushima recognized Kaminagai as his master and spent hours listening to Kaminagai's stories of how he survived in Paris and exhibited his artwork in the salons of the 1930s. They would also go fishing together and take hours to reach a place they considered special, and this place enchanted Fukushima and inspired him to make his first painting in 1946, which was entitled Paisagem ("Landscape"). As he did not have money to afford the canvas used by other artists - he could not even afford two meals a day - he improvised a canvas using a par of cotton pants. He painted the picture in red, yellow, blue, white, and black, using his fingers, and the outlines were made with the only brush he had, having finished the work in the size of 10x14 inches (27x 35.5 cm). In 1996, he gave a statement to journalist Kuniko Kobayashi from the São Paulo-Shimbun newspaper, in which he said: "That moment was sublimation. And it consolidated my trajectory as an artist." Before the first painting made by the artist in 1946, Tikashi made drawings using graphite on paper. According to his son, Takashi, "When he arrived in Brazil, he had not yet carried out any artistic activities."

At this time, he had contact with several artists, such as Milton Dacosta, Inimá de Paula, Quirino Campofiorito, Van Rogger, and Di Cavalcanti, and began to attend the National School of Fine Arts in 1942, where he audited courses. Tikashi began to improve his techniques of "dessin", which consists of drawing the lines and outlines of objects and human figures, making several nude studies. In 1947, he participated in the 52nd National Fine Arts Salon, and the following year he participated again, when he won an honorable mention and received a commentary by the artist, teacher, and critic Tomás Santa Rosa Júnior (from the newspaper A Manhã, in the Arts and Language supplement), where he stated: "Excellent artists are the Japanese without a doubt. If they do not amaze with their genius, they never disappoint. This 'Paisagem' by Fukushima is a document of good taste, of the right composition, of good color, worked with appreciable artistic refinement." Fukushima continued participating in the National Salon of Fine Arts until 1964.

In 1949, he returned to São Paulo, married Ai Saito, and set up a framing workshop in Largo Guanabara, located in the Paraíso neighborhood. Later this place became the meeting point of the artists who, in 1950, formed the Guanabara Group (the Group of 15 had an offshoot that was called Grupo Guanabara, in which there was contact between artists and critics of the local environment). The Guanabara Group was formed around Tikashi Fukushima and reached 34 members, among them artists participating in Seibi-kai and the Group of 15. The Seibi-kai at the time was being restructured since the entity had been founded in 1935 but shut down in World War II, as were schools and associations where immigrants gathered.

The sale of Fukushima's works, like those of many other artists, helped to raise funds to ensure the continuity of the salons of the Seibi-kai, which were held annually. Fukushima's wife, Ai, was depicted in numerous drawings and paintings and accompanied the artist to meetings and trips. Since Tikashi did not speak Portuguese well and Ai did, she played an important role by being a channel of communication for her husband with Brazilians. According to his daughter, Elly, when Fukushima was not known as a painter, Ai was the one who supported the household by making clothes.

=== 1950's ===
Tikashi Fukushima's painting in the 1950s was "deeply marked by gesture, rhythm, and spirituality." In 1950, his son Takashi Fukushima was born and became a painter, engraver, draftsman, and set designer. Takashi's first contact with the arts was passed on by Tikashi in his home.

In the same year, Tikashi held a solo exhibition at Club Linense in São Paulo. He also participated in the Paulista Fine Arts Salon, together with other artists of Seibi-kai, helping organize the 1st Seibi Salon, where he won the silver medal. The artist knew the importance of holding this exhibition, as he realized that the complete restructuring of the movement and the appearance of new values would only be leveraged by holding an exhibition with awards for works by Japanese and Japanese-Brazilian artists. Seibi-kai's objective was to encourage the growth of the fine arts among the Japanese through monthly sessions of discussion, commentary and criticism, exchange with artists from Brazil and Japan, as well as holding exhibitions. Still in 1950, Fukishima also cooperated in organizing the first exhibition of the Guanabara group, at Galeria Domus. About this exhibition, the writer and art critic Ibiapaba Martins wrote in the Correio Paulistano that the "exhibition that cannot be missed by those who appreciate painting is the one at Galeria Domus."

In the days of the Guanabara Group, Tikashi and the other members would go out to make records of the churches, houses, factories, and streets of various neighborhoods in São Paulo. According to Arcangelo Ianelli:

Fukushima was always in a good mood, happy. He barely spoke Portuguese, but he understood everything. He laughed a lot. He liked to paint the city, the same places. Two, three times... He used to gather the painters in his studio. His wife Ai accompanied him. She was his translator.

However, Tikashi did not portray the city exactly as it was, he made modifications and even said, "I did not see much fun in portraying reality like in a photograph, I liked to deconstruct, simplify and dismantle the forms." According to his son, this way of painting without worrying about portraying the landscapes as they were, "were the steps towards saying goodbye to figurativism."

In 1951, Tikashi participated in the 1st São Paulo Art Biennial with work No. 81 "Paisagem". From that moment on, he felt his works became influential, and the Biennal became stimulating for him. In the same year, the second exhibition of the Guanabara group was held at the Institute of Architects of Brazil, in São Paulo and he received a bronze medal at the National Modern Art Salon. In 1952, he received the bronze medal at the 17th Paulista Salon of Fine Arts and the silver medal at the 1st Salon of the Seibi Group of Visual Artists, at the Sakura Club. Still in 1953, he participated in two National Salons, the Paulista and the Rio, and the third exhibition of the Guanabara Group was held at the Fukushima Gallery. However, in the 2nd São Paulo Art Biennial, only two Japanese-Brazilian artists were accepted, Tadashi Kaminagai and Manabu Mabe. Excluded, Fukushima realized that he should be more attentive to the changes of the concrete art movement and the new trends of the abstract.

In 1954, Tikashi was awarded a prize at the 19th Paulista Fine Arts Salon and exhibited in the Preto e Branco Salon. In the same year, his daughter Elly was born. The following year, his work was shown at the 3rd São Paulo Art Biennial and the 4th Paulista Modern Art Salon. In 1956, he participated in the 5th National Salon of Modern Art, in Rio de Janeiro, at the 6th Baiano Salon of Fine Arts, in Salvador, and at the 20th Paulista Salon of Fine Arts, where he received the silver medal. The following year, 1957, he participated in the 6th National Hall of Modern Art, in the Santista Hall of Fine Arts, where he received the silver medal, and in the 21st Paulista Hall of Fine Arts, where he received the 1st Mayor of São Paulo Award.

Later the same year, he had several solo exhibitions, all in the state of São Paulo; one in Araçatuba, one in Lins, one in Marília, and two others in the city of São Paulo. This exhibition was the artist's detachment from the figurative movement. In fact, this itinerant show was named by the artist "The Exhibition of Farewell to Figurativism," which earned him the equivalent of buying two cars at the time. However this money did not reach the artist in full, as the bank went bankrupt, and the artist stated that this "was the first, but not the last blow that I suffered from the Brazilian economy.

Ivo Zanini describes Fukushima's transition from figurativism to abstractionism as follows: "For several years (from 1946 to 1960) he moved through figurativism, when he founded in São Paulo, in the neighborhood of Paraíso, the Guanabara Group, which brought together artists already in full coexistence with the oscillations of modern art" and continues, exemplifying the themes of the paintings:

But abstractionism, already widely practiced in Europe and the USA, would not take long to co-opt Fukushima, as happened with numerous other figurative artists of the time. Doors and windows, trees and flowers, cups and teapots, portraits and nudes, slowly began to give way to scratches and lines, to informal language. The search now was for shapes and constructions that transcended the figure and for colors, placid or ardent, that could manifest only conjunctural harmony (...) It was by focusing on the need for figurative-informal unfolding, concerned with painting with spontaneity in the quest to transmit sensations and inner truth, based on gesturalism, that Tikashi Fukushima researched and embarked on abstractionism. He became almost obsessive in painting canvases where images merge to suggest infinite seas, winds crossing deserts or mountains, autumn mornings, mirages, virgin territory, mountain twilights, breezes, dreams, celestial serenity, etc. A dreamlike world, through which he travels, perhaps even as if on another planet, in which only lyricism cannot be absent.

In the book Life and Art of the Japanese in Brazil ("Vida e Arte dos Japoneses no Brasil"), Cecília França Lourenço describes the use of geometry and abstractionism by Japanese-Brazilian artists as a response to a "vital and even cultural impulse, more easily identified with a gesture, stain, and formal research, and therefore an inexhaustible source revitalized through experience". Artists such as Mabe and Tikashi Fukushima were able to contribute decisively to the development of this abstract trend, In fact, abstractionism is where the most important and most productive phase of their work can be found.

In 1958, the fiftieth anniversary of Japanese immigration was celebrated, with several exhibitions of the Japanese-Brazilian community taking place. Fukushima's works were in several group exhibitions: in the 23rd Paulista Salon of Fine Arts, and in the 4th Grupo Guanabara's exhibition, which received a positive comment from the artist and art critic Quirino da Silva, in the Diário da Noite: "the critics could learn from the group exhibition of the Grupo Guanabara something about painting." The works were also in the 4th Group Seibi of Artists Salon, where he won the great gold medal, and in the 7th Paulista Salon of Modern Art, in the gallery Prestes Maia, where Tikashi won the small silver medal. Regarding the latter, the journalist and critic Aracy Amaral, who later became professor of Art History at the University of São Paulo, observes: "Oriental by excellence, Fukushima expresses himself with all the refinement of the art of his people. Matter is his main characteristic, of exceptional richness, with wonderful chromatic variations, using new or little used materials and techniques in our medium, achieving results of great beauty and poetry." Another comment on his 1958 painting, made by Cecília França Lourenço, is that "one cannot fail to recognize the maturity of his production in 1958, when he dedicated himself to the procedures of abstraction, even approaching action painting with quite a vigor."

In 1959, Tikashi's work was shown at the Dallas Museum of Art, in Dallas, Texas, in the Grupo Guanabara's 5th exhibition, in the 8th São Paulo Modern Art Salon, where he won the great silver medal. In the same year, the Grupo Guanabara ended its activities, after some maturement, especially regarding the last two exhibitions of the group, which had catalogs, texts by critics, and lectures. At this time, the Japanese-Brazilian artistic influence was strengthened, with awards at the international level. The critic Mário Pedrosa praised the presence of Japanese-Brazilians in abstractionism, but highlighted Fukushima and Tomie Ohtake, pointing out "the delicate atmosphere, spiritualized, of a nature irresistibly integrated with the presence of a man who already in part makes it, being, however, of it a single and inseparable particle."

=== 1960's ===
Throughout the 1960s, one of the characteristics of Fukushima's painting is Japan; placing his memories and impressions of that country into his art. In 1960, he organized a solo exhibition in Campinas, and in the same year, he participated in other group exhibitions such as the 9th National Salon of Modern Art, at the Museum of Modern Art in Rio de Janeiro, at the 9th Paulista Modern Art Salon, where he won the small gold medal, and at the Prestes Maia Gallery, where he won the small gold medal. He also exhibited at the Agricultural Cooperative of Cotia and received the 1st "Governador Leonel Brizola" prize at the Rio Grande do Sul Contemporary Art Salon. In the same year, the Folha de S. Paulo newspaper points out: "Fukushima's works have systematically appeared in the collective exhibitions of the Japanese colony in this capital and modern art salons, and the painter has been distinguished with several prizes."

In 1961, Tikashi had two individual exhibitions, one at the Ambiente Gallery and the other at the Museum of Modern Art in São Paulo. The newspaper O Estado de S. Paulo, of February 25, 1961, published the opinion of the director of this museum: "His extreme virtuosity as a painter sometimes appears in all its strength, because one feels in this the pleasure of the virtuoso in overcoming difficulties". He also stated that "Fukushima has from his people and culture, the figure of detail, extreme virtuosity in finishes, and a refinement of sensibility" and ended by saying that "everything is overcome by the optimistic impetus, the perennial song of life that is the very essence of his painting." Also in February, Jornal do Brasil published a text by art critic Mário Pedrosa, in which he commented on the way Fukushima painted: "He works by first taking notes, which he ends up fixing on a point, from where sudden suggestions come to him. These then guide him in the course of the work. The idea, if it can be called an idea, comes to him on the spot. The forming and inspiring nucleus is always a finding of matter, which gives him the key to the work. Often this nucleus is no more than an impression of beautiful effect, like a blank stroke of light."

In March, the Museum of Modern Art held an exhibition with works by Fukushima and Samson Flexor, where the great difference in style between the two painters was highlighted. About the works, the following comment was made: "Twenty large canvases are offered to the visitor's examination, and in them, the varied scale of motifs, which, after all, are not motifs, as the painter denies... For the latter, each of the paintings has a name and a destiny, but in truth, they are only painting, and, as paintings, matter. Nothing more. Hence the astonishing serenity." In comparing Fukushima's painting with Flexor's, it was commented that the results were opposite, for while Flexor's painting showed restlessness, Fukushima's revealed "a great serenity."

In the same year, in group exhibitions, Tikashi participated in the 16th Fine Arts Salon of the City of Belo Horizonte, at the Pampulha Museum of Art, where he was awarded a prize. He also exhibited at the 10th Modern Art Salon of São Paulo, the 6th São Paulo Art Biennial, and the 6th Tokyo Biennial. Tikashi had already sent a letter to his mother, Ine, telling her that his painting had traveled to Japan for the Biennial. She went on the opening day: "She was happy when she saw my picture in the catalog."

In 1962, the artist had a solo show at Galeria Astréia, São Paulo, and participated in a group show in Bragança Paulista. In the same year, his paintings were shown in the exhibition called "New Art of Brazil", in several places in the United States, which were: at the Colorado Springs Fine Arts Center, in Colorado Springs, in Minneapolis, at the Walker Art Center, in Saint Louis, at the Saint Louis Art Museum, and in San Francisco, at the San Francisco Museum of Art. He also exhibited at the Paraná Salon, in the Public Library of Paraná, where he was awarded "best national painter". In the same year, he had an exhibition at the 11th Paulista Salon of Modern Art, where he won the 1st State Governor's Prize, and at the "Collective Exhibition" at the Folhas Gallery, both in São Paulo. The opinion of the writer and art critic José Geraldo Vieira of the Folha de S.Paulo was that: "Of course, a painter like Tikashi Fukushima guides himself by various guides. He attaches himself to pictorial conglomerates, surprises them in the fashion in vogue, and goes about making art according to how he observes and feels."

In 1963, Fukushima organized three individual exhibitions, two at Galeria La Rouche and another one at the Institute of Architects of Brazil, all of them in São Paulo. Group exhibitions were held at the Carlos Gomes Museum, at the 7th São Paulo Art Biennial, and at the 12th National Modern Art Salon, Rio de Janeiro, where he was awarded a trip across Brazil. In the same year, José Geraldo Vieira commented again about his taste in painting and quoted Fukushima saying that "Of course when I speak of landscape, I am not referring to the realism of nature transferred to the canvas by the objective painters or by impressionists of the level of Pissarro or Sisley. I refer to the tachist painting, of reliefs and anaglyphs, of concretions and matter, of variables diffuse and interticial."

During the military dictatorship in Brazil, many artists showed restlessness, with surrealist tendencies, which demanded constant updating, but Tikashi preferred to delve into the abstractionist option. In 1964, he had his work presented in a solo exhibition in São Paulo, and group exhibitions once in São Paulo, at Galeria La Rouche, and twice in Rio de Janeiro, at the Museum of Modern Art of Rio de Janeiro, and at the 13th National Salon of Modern Art. Paolo Maranca wrote for the newspaper UH that: "In this year's Salon, Fukushima will again plead for the grand prize, of which he is the most quoted candidate, according to the unanimous opinion of the critics." In 1965, he had two solo exhibitions, one at the Galeria Ibeu Copacabana, Rio de Janeiro, and another at the Galeria Astréia, in São Paulo,.

In group exhibitions, he participated in the event "Brazilian Painters Today", at The New York Hilton Gallery, at the Rockefeller Center. He also had his work presented in the "Japanese Artists of Brazil" exhibition in Oakland, United States, and in the 8th São Paulo Art Biennial, where he received an award from Brazilian Ministry of Foreign Affairs. The Japanese Artists of Brazil exhibition was held in Tokyo and Washington D.C. Tikashi had a series of exhibitions sponsored by the Brazilian embassy, which were held in La Paz, Lima, and Caracas. Cecília França Lourenço, in commenting on Tomie Ohtake's work, when she reached a level of maturity, compared the artist's work to that of Fukushima and Mabe, in the context that all three had "a certain restraint, without allowing the emotion of the work to be totally extravasated."

In 1966, Fukushima had a solo exhibition at Chelsea Art Gallery, in São Paulo. Regarding this exhibition, it was published in Jornal da Tarde, on May 25, 1966: "As it becomes erudite, painting is often led to seek the opposite path: the canvas then suffers an almost uniform treatment, one seeks the encounter and not the challenge between the colors; the tonal landscapes are carefully measured until the picture becomes a succession of low modulations and the spectator must look for special angles to well distinguish the variations inserted in the surface of the canvas." This is a comparison to Fukushima's painting,

The exaggerations of such a conception, when taken to their extreme limits, have led, in the case of other painters, to the presentation of monochrome canvases: completely white and black. This is not the case with Fukushima. His painting is abstract but worked in every detail, and in some paintings, they are very clear. In others, which led us to these considerations, successive zones of red predominate, rarely interrupted by points of light, and then we have the impression that his painting, so carefully done, is being hidden.

In the same year, in group exhibitions, Tikashi's work was presented in the exhibitions "The Emergent Decade: Latin American Painters and Paintings in the 1960's", at the Solomon R. Guggenheim Museum in New York; in the 1st Art Biennial in Salvador, Bahia; in the 10th Salon of the Seibi Group of Artists, in the Brazilian Society of Japanese Culture; at the Museum of Contemporary Art of the University of São Paulo, in the exhibition "Three Premisses", at the Museum of Brazilian Art of the Armando Álvares Penteado Foundation. The following year, he organized two solo exhibitions, in Rio de Janeiro and São Paulo, and also had his work exhibited at the 9th São Paulo Art Biennal.

In 1968, Fukushima organized two solo exhibitions, both in São Paulo, and collectively he participated in the Leirner Award for Contemporary Art. José Geraldo Vieira, for the Folha de S.Paulo, made a comparison of Fukushima's paintings with those he had been painting until a few years before, since then they represented "ermine landscapes" and the more recent ones acted as "mystical altarpieces", "extraordinarily poetic and religious". Among other excerpts Vieira described:

Until recently, Fukushima's painting sought to synthesize, as seen in "vol d’oiseau" ("as the crow flies"), one of these ermine landscapes, without lanterns, without human figures, without idols. The pure micro-geography of the ground and the slope. But now Fukushima puts us before screens that act on our sensibility like mystical retables. It is no longer the earth; now it is the atmosphere, the refraction of the rising sun tinting supports with the magic of networked structural wefts, in diaphanous masses, of sparse spiritualities. An extraordinarily poetic and religious painting, but having more of religious and its mysterious chromatic vibrancy.

In 1969, Fukushima organized a solo exhibition in Rio de Janeiro, another one in Santos, and in group exhibitions he had his works presented in several places. A highlight of the year was the exhibition "Japanese-Brazilian Artists", which took place in Copenhagen, Stockholm, and Oslo. He also participated in the exhibition "19 Japanese-Brazilian Artists" at the Museum of Contemporary Art of the University of São Paulo, and exhibited in the "1st Panorama of Brazilian Current Art", at the Museum of Modern Art of São Paulo. Tikashi had his work exhibited in the Alberto Bonfiglioli Gallery Exhibition.

=== 1970's ===
1970 was the year Fukushima returned to Japan for the first time since he had immigrated to Brazil. When back in Brazil, he began to paint the Quatro Estações ("Four Seasons") series of abstracts, where he illustrated the mountains, the movement of the winds, and the waves of the sea of the island of Honshu, Japan. From then on, he did this multiple times in large paintings.

In the same year, Tikashi held a solo exhibition in São Paulo,. Group exhibitions that featured his works were the World Exposition in Osaka and at the Pinacoteca do Estado de São Paulo. Veja Magazine, in an article called "The poetry of the abstract", quoted three of the artist's paintings, as follows:

Tikashi Fukushima's paintings sort of capture a complex spatial choreography. In an ochre field, indefinite green, red, and black forms flutter in an immaterial dance. Pasty masses, reminiscent of dripping paint, converge and separate, rhythmically and musically. On another canvas, aerial battles are fought, and nuclei of color collide dramatically amidst voluminous clouds, blown by the wind and touched by the setting sun. Even the violent movements of fleeing colors are always contained by a deeply poetic and elegant atmosphere.

In 1971, four solo exhibitions were organized, one in Brasília and two in Rio de Janeiro, and in March of the same year, the Pan-American Union dedicated a solo exhibition to Fukushima in Washington D. C. In the same year, Walter Zanini, who at the time was director of the Museum of Contemporary Art of the University of São Paulo, brother of the also critic Ivo Zanini, wrote about Fukushima's work stating: "using impressionistic means at first, he moved on to more conceptual painting, influenced by Cubism assimilated to the fanciful contemplativeness of his mind. He paved the way for a more intuitive and informal space where goldens, blacks, and especially greens and reds find the most delicate diapasons, associated and placed in complementary oppositions..."

1972 was the year that Seiki-kai ended its activities. In the same year a new artistic movement of the Japanese-Brazilian community was established and the artists continued their activities in the I Bunkyo Hall, coordinated by the Brazilian Society of Japanese Culture. In Tikashi's words "it was a way for us to perpetuate the movement." Fukushima lived for a period of time in Maryland, USA, where he made paintings in a rented studio. Still in 1972, Fukushima organized a solo exhibition at the Galeria Guignard, Belo Horizonte, and another at the Art Museum of the Americas, Washington D. C. About this show, the head of the visual arts department of the Organization of American States, José Gómez-Sicre said that "like his colleagues, Fukushima is highly skilled in the techniques of his art and has a delicate, refined sense of conception."

For the Folha de S.Paulo of November 19, 1972, in the article entitled "A good understanding of the Brazilian oriental system", Ivo Zanini described Fukushima as one who arrived in Brazil in a modest way and over the years "imposed his art and today is one of the most authentic and recognized of the group of Japanese who contribute to the development of art in our country". He described the relationship between father and son Takashi, who did not have the influence of his father in his paintings; Takashi, who was 22 years old at the time, had already been painting for three years without any pressure from Tikashi, the father being an abstractionist and the son a figurative artist. About Tikashi's works, Zanini comments on the time the artist spent in the United States, that Tikashi believed that his art had undergone changes and consequently had a good return on the sales of his paintings.

The following year, Fukushima organized a show in Rio de Janeiro and collectively had his work presented at the Museum of Modern Art of São Paulo. That same year, the critic Jacob Klintowitz commented in Jornal da Tarde about the way Fukushima painted: "to construct his pictorial universe, Fukushima needs nothing more than paint and canvas... The first remarkable thing is that the color does not have the function of coloring..."

In 1974, the painter organized a solo exhibition at Documenta Art Gallery, São Paulo. For this exhibition, it was announced that Tikashi Fukushima's "strong and well-composed coloring is back," from the artist "who needs no introduction," because "his painting in each exhibition, is a happy reunion between the viewer and beauty." About the interpretation of the painting, it was stated that Tikashi prefers not to talk about it, but for the viewer to interpret it, for "painting can run free through the imagination at the bottom of some sea, among snowy mountains or simply in the clouds. The interpretations, so varied, are the least important thing as if Fukushima's only goal was as simple as the purest contemplation." The environment and painting technique were described, mentioning that the artist worked in a secluded location, "of true Eastern contemplation of nature." On abstraction, it was described as, unlike what one might think, that one might be painting at random, throwing paints in an "accidental arrangement," in fact "Tikashi builds each portion of the canvas with discipline and application as if following a pre-established mental design." In the same year, Fukushima was on the jury of the 4th Bunkyo Salon, alongside Manabu Mabe, Kichizaemon Takahashi, Massao Okinaka, Masumi Tsuchimoto, Yutaka Toyota, and Bin Kondo.

In the following year, Tikashi organized another solo exhibition in São Paulo, and a group exhibition called "2nd Brazil-Japan Fine Arts Exhibition" was held in five different cities: Atami, Kyoto, Rio de Janeiro, São Paulo and Tokyo. He was part of the jury of the 5th Bunkyo Salon. In 1976, Fukushima organized a solo exhibition in São Paulo and had his work presented in the group exhibition at the Museum of Modern Art in São Paulo.

At the end of the 1970s, the Japanese-Brazilians had a different situation in terms of interaction, a contrary situation if compared to the times of World War II, when they were viewed with mistrust by the population and the government. In these new times, the galleries systematically acquired the production of abstract artists, since after the first Biennials there was opportunity for dissemination of their productions and conquering of the critics. There were collectors interested in these artists, both in Brazil and abroad.

In 1977, Fukushima was appointed president of the Fine Arts Commission of the Brazilian Society of Japanese Culture and remained in that position until 1990 In the same year, he organized a solo exhibition in Rio de Janeiro, and his work was part of the "3rd Brazil-Japan Fine Arts" group exhibition, which took place in Rio de Janeiro, São Paulo, and Tokyo.

In 1978, the art critic Radha Abramo wrote in the newspaper Folha de S.Paulo that

Fukushima exposes the interfaces of his local genius or cultural gesture, merging, with extreme sensitivity, the universe of his oriental roots through the abstract staining of Japanese calligraphy with the universe of his Brazilian roots absorbed by the landscape that surrounds him. He creates an artistic language inserted in the cultural particularities of his complex and the social complex where he lives.

In 1979, he became a member of the Arts Commission of the Brazil-Japan Foundation of Arts, and in the same year, Fukushima organized an exhibition in Rio de Janeiro. In group exhibitions, his creations were in the "4th Brazil-Japan Fine Arts Exhibition", which took place in Atami, Curitiba, Kyoto, São Paulo, and Tokyo, and in the "11th Panorama of Current Brazilian Art" at the Museum of Modern Art in São Paulo.

=== 1980's ===
Art in the 1980s was influenced by the aesthetics of other artists and also by the actions of pioneers, such as Tomoo Handa, abstractionists, as well as Manabu Mabe, Tikashi Fukushima, Tomie Ohtake, Kazuo Wakabayashi, and others. In 1980, Tikashi's work was presented in the exhibition "Masters of Lyrical Abstractionism in Brazil." In 1981, Fukushima organized an individual exhibition of his work in Belo Horizonte, and in the same year, the "5th Brazil-Japan Fine Arts Exhibition" was organized in the cities of Atami, Kyoto, São Paulo, and Tokyo. His paintings were also in the "Latin American Exhibition of Brazil/Japan Contemporary Art," at the National Art Museum, Osaka.

The painter also produced two panels for the Bozano Bank, Simonsen in Rio de Janeiro and São Paulo (the following year). 1982 was the year of the death of his master, Tadashi Kaminagai., and although Tikashi acknowledged Kaminagai as his master, he denied that Kaminagai had influenced the way he painted. About this he said that "Kaminagai represents an intermediate phase between the figurative and the abstract, and happy and light colors were his favorite, while I always try to give sobriety and depth to my works with dark and dense colors."

In 1983, Fukushima organized a solo exhibition at Galeria Alberto Bonfiglioli, São Paulo. It was said by Ivo Zanini that Tikashi was one of the "mainstays" of the abstractionist art that consecrated the Japanese nucleus, and also commented that the fourteen paintings exhibited at Galeria Alberto Bonfiglioli, which would be on display until December 23 of that year, "express with crystalline clarity this statement" that there was a "dynamic and evolutionary stage of Brazilian art centered in São Paulo". About the works, Zanini said that the "splendor of the forms and colors is even more depurated than in his previous phases glided with magic through the huge spaces [of the canvases]" and continued: "A vast chromatic walk is the result of Fukushima's work". Regarding Tikashis' abstractions, he wrote, "rich in lyricism, we can see what he suggests in the titles of the works, that is, the sea, the sky, the earth, Andean peaks, and others. And why not? They are chromatic poems that the artist of the fruitful Grupo Guanabara recreates before our eyes. Fantasy, reality, abstraction, figurative regions, everything appears mixed and concentrated in his sensitive painting". The critic concluded by saying that Fukushima was "an example for today's generation." Collectively, in the same year, his work was present in the "6th Brazil-Japan Fine Arts Exhibition," which took place in the cities of Atami, Kyoto, Rio de Janeiro, São Paulo, and Tokyo.

In 1984, the exhibition Masters of Brazilian Abstractionism was organized, which also contained Fukushima's work. The exhibitions took place in Buenos Aires, The Hague, Lisbon, London, Madrid, Milan, New York, Paris, Rome, and Washington D.C. The following year, Tikashi organized a solo exhibition in São Paulo, at Galeria de Arte André, which had the catalog and its preface written by Ivo Zanini. In this preface, he stated that for several years he has avoided writing this kind of text, because many times the commissioned text diverges from what is exhibited, but for Fukushima's work he made an exception. In the words of the critic, it was because: "we are facing an accomplished artist, absolutely coherent in his work philosophy and the seriousness of the construction of his imagistic world of colors and shapes". Zanini described the paintings in the exhibition in such a way that they "often fragment themselves into supposed episodes that vary from the real to the oneiric, from the telluric to the cosmic" and the final result of his work the artist "achieves with security, joining to his elaborations eastern and western mysticism". Regarding the works in the exhibition, Zanini said that as most of the works were from that year, visitors would see the "full maturity of the artist" because these works have the "uncontrolled gesture, the aggressive impact, the purposeful shock provoked by the conscious/unconscious, so widespread nowadays, pass by in the artist's paintings". Fukushima's works have also been presented at the Paço Imperial, the São Paulo Museum of Art, and the Museum of Contemporary Art of the University of São Paulo.

In 1986, Tikashi organized a solo exhibition in Salvador and participated in the exhibitions "Times of War: International Hotel", and "Times of War: Mauá Pension" at the Banerj Art Gallery. At this same gallery, for the exhibition called "War Times", there was a report entitled "From Nazism to Art Galleries". In the newspaper O Estado de S. Paulo, Angélica de Moraes mentioned that "multiple artists coming from abroad helped to push Brazil towards modernity", and among the artists coming from Japan she mentioned Tadashi Kaminagai and Tikashi Fukushima. She added that the Japanese had a particular difficulty due to the suspicion that they were spies in the service of the Axis. In the same year, his work was shown at the São Paulo Museum of Art, and the exhibitions "Times of War: International Hotel" and "Times of War: Mauá Pension." were presented again; at the Cásper Líbero Foundation and the São Paulo Biennal Foundation, respectively.

In 1987, Tikashi organized a solo exhibition at the Porto Alegre Art Exchange. His work was selected for the "20th Contemporary Art Exhibition" in São Paulo, and his work was in two other exhibitions, also in São Paulo. About Fukushima's art in the period between the 1970s and 1980s, art critic Ivo Zanini commented:

He came from Japan in 1940, and here he improved his forms and mastered the chromatic balance, influenced by the contagious splendor of Brazilian tropicalism, especially in the 1970s and 1980s, when his informal composition reached its peak. Each painting was an updated look, rich in nuances that provoked praise and also restrictions. The latter came from some who were not happy with the artist's rapid rise and the growing acceptance of the trend. Impregnating since the beginning of his production the East-West symbiosis, Tikashi Fukushima became a true poet of colors, perhaps highlighting feelings of the two homelands, the one in which he was born and the other that welcomed him.

1988 was the year that Fukushima participated in a series of exhibitions commemorating the 80 years of Japanese Immigration in Brazil. In the same year, he organized an exhibition at the André Art Gallery, in São Paulo, and his work was selected for the exhibition "Inheritance of Japan: aspects of Japanese-Brazilian visual arts", which was held in Belém, Brasília, Curitiba, Manaus, Porto Alegre, Recife, and São Paulo. His work was also selected to be in the exhibition "Imin80" in Londrina; in the exhibition "15 Years of Fine Arts Exhibition Brazil-Japan", at Mokiti Okada M.O.A. Foundation, in São Paulo; and in the same place the 5th Salon of Art Brazil-Japan. He also participated in the exhibition "Life and Art of the Japanese in Brazil", in São Paulo.

Also in 1988, João de Jesus Paes Loureiro released the book Illuminations/illuminations: a season in Japan, which was illustrated by Fukushima. The magazine Veja of July 22, 1988, described Tikashi as "a master of intense colors", in which the "touch of the brush leaves its mark in the form of volume". The same issue emphasized that the "importance given to the work of Mabe, Fukushima, and Shiró attracted a new wave of Japanese artists to Brazil, who arrived in the country mature and with established aesthetic positions.

In 1989, Tikashi's work was shown in Lisbon, at the José de Azeredo Perdigão Center of Modern Art; in the exhibition at the National Museum of Fine Arts, in Rio de Janeiro; and in the exhibition called "Brazil Paintings, 19th and 20th Centuries: Artworks from Banco Itaú's Collection", in São Paulo. The newspaper O Estado de S. Paulo of December 16, 1989, stated that in Brazilian art the Japanese-Brazilians stood out within the so-called informal abstractionism, the adepts being Fukushima, Mabe, Wakabayashi, and Shiró.

=== 1990's ===
The 1990s were the last decade that Fukushima produced new works. According to the opinion of Hélio Alves Neves, "today, in full maturity, Tikashi Fukushima feels fulfilled as an artist. First, for turning the evolution of his work into a school admired and respected in Brazil and abroad, and then, as a human being, for being able to express all his feelings through his brushes, charged with the emotions of the colors of his palette". About Fukushimas's painting, Neves also explained that:

Tikashi Fukushima makes use of textures, thus giving volumes of light and dark, tinting the stain, creating effects in a valorizing alternation. The planes are not planes, they are tonal passages, and the line, when it appears, is only an effect of the brush's limits, or even the consequence of the fluidity of the paint that the artist deliberately lets flow. The colors are intensely poetic, treating the severity of the environment and softening the result in themes such as Dusk on the Mountain, Wind, and Sea, Dream, and Soft Sensation, among others. These are states of the soul that he does not comment on, but expresses with such mastery that convinces us that the matter exhibited there is not only oil paste and pigments but melodic notes for our eyes.

In 1990, the "9th Brazil-Japan Contemporary Art Exhibition" was held in the Japanese cities of Atami, Sapporo, and Tokyo, and in Brazil it was held in the cities of Brasilia, Rio de Janeiro, and São Paulo. Another exhibition that showed Fukushima's work was "Figurativism/Abstraction: red in Brazilian painting", held that year in Brasilia and São Paulo, and the following year in Belo Horizonte. Also in 1991, the artist's paintings were shown at the 3rd National Biennial of Santos, at the Patrícia Galvão Cultural Center. In 1992, the "10th Brazil-Japan Contemporary Art Exhibition" presented Tikashi's work. In Japan, the exhibition was held in the cities of Atami, Kyoto, and Tokyo, while in Brazil the exhibition took place in São Paulo. Also in São Paulo, a group exhibition containing the artist's works was organized, called "Grupo Guanabara: 1950-1959." On this exhibition, the renowned auctioneer Renato Magalhães Gouvêa stated: "it was possible to gather works by the members of Grupo Guanabara and record their impressions offering a serious starting point for further studies."

In 1993, as a continuation of the exhibition "Figurativism/Abstraction: red in Brazilian painting", another exhibition was held in Campinas. In the same year, the artist's work was selected to be shown at the Pinacoteca do Estado de São Paulo. His works were also exhibited in the "Portuguese-Japanese-Brazilian Exhibition", at the Brazilian Art Museum at the Armando Álvares Penteado Foundation. In 1994, the painter's works were in group exhibitions, all held in the capital of the state of São Paulo. Outside the capital, his work was exhibited at the 1st Paulista Biennial of Contemporary Art, in Valinhos.

In 1995, Tikashi was chosen to be the president of the Japanese-Brazilian Museum of Art. In the same year, he had his work exhibited in Brasília and in the exhibition of "Contemporary Japanese-Brazilian Painters", which took place in São Paulo and the Japanese cities of Niigata, and Tokushima. The following year, it was also held in Gifu and Tokyo. This exhibition was part of the Centenary of the Brazil-Japan Friendship, an event which commemorated the 100th anniversary of the signing of the Treaty of Friendship, Commerce and Navigation, which formalized the beginning of the relations between the two countries.

Still in 1995, Fukushima's work was present in two exhibitions in São Paulo, and a group exhibition at the Metropolitan Museum of Art in Curitiba. In the Portuguese capital, Lisbon, his work was shown at the Jerónimos Monastery. In the following year, Tikashi organized a solo show in São Paulo at the Brazilian Society of Japanese Culture, which was a retrospective of his fifty-year career and was visited by a large public, including the Japanese ambassador to Brazil, Chihiro Tsukada, and the Japanese consul-general in São Paulo, Katsuyuki Tanaka. In the same year, his work was exhibited at the Museum of Contemporary Art at the University of São Paulo. 1997 was the year of one of Tikashi's last exhibitions in São Paulo. Collectively, his work was chosen to be presented in Jacareí. Also in 1997, the painter received from the Emperor of Japan the decoration of the Order of the Sacred Treasure.

In 1998, Fukushima's work was shown at the Itinerant International Japan-Brazil Exhibition, which took place at the Clóvis Salgado Foundation - Palace of Arts, in Belo Horizonte, and at the Usiminas Cultural Center, in Ipatinga. He had his work presented in three group exhibitions in São Paulo. The following year, the "International Japan-Brazil Itinerant Exhibition" was held in Brasília at the Ministry of Foreign Affairs and also at the São Paulo Museum of Art. The exhibition "Daily Life/Art. Consumption - Metamorphosis of Consumption" was presented at the Itaú Cultural Center.

After a life of great accomplishments, art provided Tikashi with much better living conditions than when he started his life as an immigrant. According to art critic Ichiro Hariu, Fukushima belonged to the generation of pre-war immigrants, composed of ordinary immigrants, who after several changes in their lives awakened to the fine arts. According to him, the demand for works of art in Brazil was great, but the socio-economic inequality was huge, and buyers were limited to people of the wealthier class, companies, and public agencies. Still according to Hariu, artists such as Ohtake, Fukushima, Mabe, and others are recognized abstractionists, representatives of Brazil, who have many supporters, and live in Hariu's words, in "palaces." Tikashi once said, "I don't know why, but these paintings sell like water. It even looks like I'm manufacturing counterfeit bills!"

=== Later years ===
In his later years, Tikashi was already suffering from Alzheimer's disease. In 2001 he had his last solo exhibition before his death, which was called "Fukushima by Fukushima", at the Pinacoteca do Estado de São Paulo. This event was curated by his son Takashi Fukushima, who also released a book called "Fukushima", which is dedicated to his father's work. Collectively, his work was presented in an exhibition called "Japanese-Brazilian Art: Moment", at the Euroart Castelli Gallery in São Paulo. In the same year, Fukushima received the award for the best retrospective of the year from the São Paulo Association of Art Critics - APCA.

Tikashi was admitted to the Santa Cruz Hospital on a Wednesday, with a suspected heart attack. He underwent an angioplasty, and at midnight on Sunday, October 14, 2001, died.

When Fukushima died, in addition to other works, he left in his studio several blank canvases with red lines, as if they were veins, because the artist had the habit of spreading several red lines on the canvas. In his own words "they are the veins, the soul of the painting,". These lines ended up hidden, under other layers of paint.

=== Personal life ===
Takashi Fukushima met Ai Saito, who had arrived in Brazil in 1934, when she was 12 years old. She grew up teaching dressmaking and tailoring. Her relatives had arranged a fiancé for her, through the miai, a Japanese custom of arranged marriages. Ai's suitor was a medical student, but while visiting an uncle she was introduced to Tikashi and from then on they began a relationship hidden from Ai's parents, as they wanted her to marry the then-medical student. For six years Tikashi sent letters to Ai, keeping the courtship hidden when he finally managed to convince her family to have her marry him, which occurred in 1949.

An article in Veja magazine from 1970 reported some of the painter's habits at the time, such as "it is difficult to find Fukushima, even in his house in the distant district of Cidade Adhemar, where a miniature Japanese garden, on landscaped earth steps, recalls the oriental symbology of water, stone, and vegetation". Fukushima had several points of contact with his inseparable friends Mabe, Nomura and Wakabayashi, with whom he played cards and complicated oriental dominoes on Sundays". For the making of the story, the following was reported: "With an affectuous smile, takes puffs from his pipe, laughing unexpectedly when he does not want to answer a question directly."

In the year of his death, he had not painted for two years, due to health problems. That year his routine consisted of staying up until 4 a.m. to watch the sumo championship on cable TV. He also had the habit of listening to Paganini and dined out almost every night. At that time he spoke little.

== Legacy ==
After his death, several exhibitions of his works were organized; in the year of his death, the exhibition "4 Decades" was organized in São Paulo at the Nova André Gallery. The following year his works were shown twice again at the gallery, the first exhibition being called "Beyond the Canvas" and the other The "Seven Bastions of Brazilian Abstractionism". Also in the year of the artist's death, Councilman Aurélio Nomura presented on December 13 the bill PJ 715-2001, which became law number 13.507 of January 8, 2003, naming a previously unnamed space located on Avenida Politécnica, Butantã district, as Tikashi Fukushima Square. The bill was passed on December 13, 2003.

In 2003, Tikashi's works were exhibited twice at the Museum of Contemporary Art of the University of São Paulo. The first exhibition was called "MAC USP 40 Years: Contemporary Interfaces" and the second "Artknowledge: USP 70 Years". The following year, at Prestes Maia Gallery, the exhibition called "Guanabara Group at Masp" was held, and in the same year, the exhibition "Gesture and Expression: the Informal Abstractionism in the JP Morgan Chase and MAM Collection" was organized at the São Paulo Museum of Modern Art. On September 28, 2006, the episode "Tikashi Fukushima - the paths of abstraction" was broadcast by SescTV, in the program "O mundo da arte"("The world of art"), which exhibited Tikashi's journey, making a retrospective of the artist, at the Pinacoteca de São Paulo, and showing all the phases of his production.

In 2008, Fukushima's work was exhibited along with works by other Japanese-Brazilian artists at the Bandeirantes Palace, in the exhibition called "Japanese presence in Brazilian art: from figuration to abstraction." From April 28 to December 30, 2012, the exhibition was held at the Pinacoteca do Estado de São Paulo, called "São Paulo, an immigrant look," with about 30 works by Tikashi and other artists from the period of 1893 to 1980.

== Collections ==
Fukushima's work is part of important collections in Brazil and abroad, including:

- Rockefeller Collection
- Roberto Marinho Collection
- V+R Sapoznik collection
- Japanese Embassy, Brasília
- MOA Museum of Art, Japan
- Museum of Contemporary Art, USP
- Museum of Art, Belo Horizonte
- Modern Art Museum of Brasília
- Modern Art Museum of Curitiba
- Porto Alegre Museum of Modern Art
- Rio de Janeiro Museum of Modern Art
- Museum of Modern Art of Latin America, Washington
- Imperial Palace, Tokyo
- Pinacoteca do Estado de São Paulo

== Bibliography ==
- Aguilar, Nelson (1994). Bienal Brasil Seculo XX (in Portuguese). Fundação Bienal De São Paulo. ISBN 9788585298029.
- Cocchiarale, Fernando; Menezes, Gladstone (2019). Antologia – Nilce Eiko Hanashiro (in Portuguese). Museu Nacional da República. ISBN 978-85-913806-4-0.
- D'Horta, Arnaldo Pedroso (2000). O olho da consciência: juízos críticos e obras desajuizadas: escritos sobre arte (in Portuguese). EdUSP. ISBN 9788531405334.
- Fukushima, Takashi (2001). Tikashi Fukushima (in Portuguese). São Paulo: Sociedade Brasileira de Cultura Japonesa, Imprensa Oficial.
- Galeria de Arte André (1985). Fukushima 85: catálogo (in Portuguese). São Paulo: Galeria de Arte André.
- Moreno, Leila Yaeko Kiyomura (2012). Dissertação apresentada para obtenção do Título de Mestre em Estética e História da Arte intitulada: Tikashi Fukushima: um sonho em quatro estações (Estudo sobre o Ma no processo de criação do artista nipo-brasileiro) (in Portuguese). São Paulo: Universidade de São Paulo.
- Museu de Arte de São Paulo Assis Chateaubriand (1988). Vida e arte dos japoneses no Brasil. Banco América do Sul.
- Pedrosa, Mario (1998). Acadêmicos e Modernos, Textos Escolhidos (in Portuguese). EdUSP. ISBN 978-8531404269.
- Sociedade Brasileira de Cultura Japonesa (1995). Centenário de amizade Brasil-Japão: Exposição dos pintores nipo-brasileiros contemporâneos (in Portuguese). Escritório do Japão da Exposição dos Pintores Nipo-Brasileiros Contemporâneos.
