= Soma General Hospital =

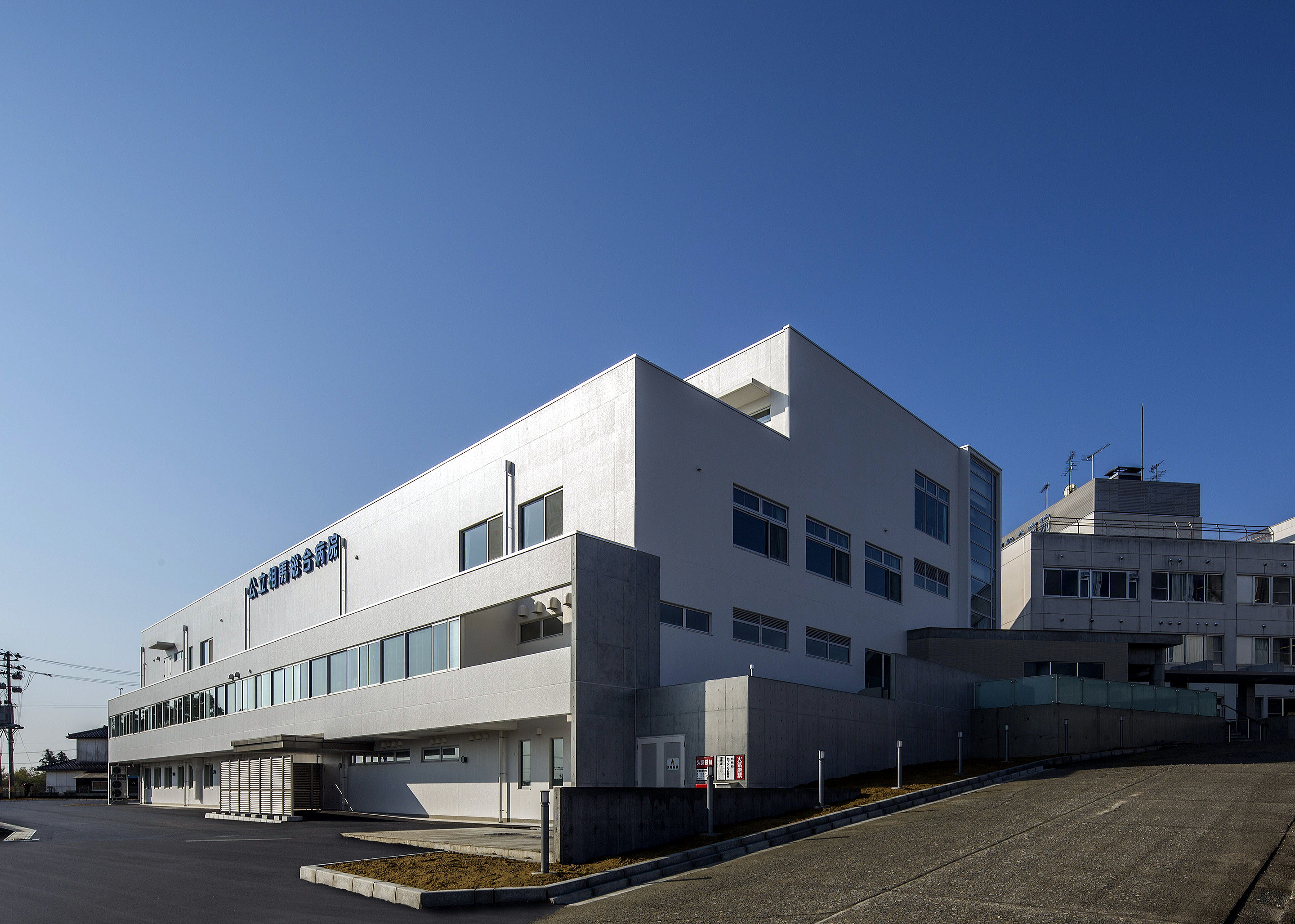
- Soma General Hospital in 2015

Geography
- Location: 142 Tsubogasaku, Niinuma, Soma, Fukushima Prefecture, 976-0011, Japan
- Coordinates: 37.8112°N 140.9217°E

Organisation
- Care system: Public
- Type: District and Teaching

Services
- Emergency department: Level II (Sōsō district)
- Beds: 240

History
- Opened: October 1, 1970; 55 years ago

Links
- Website: www.bb.soma.or.jp/~psghjim1/
- Lists: Hospitals in Japan

Soma General Hospital (公立相馬総合病院, Kōritsu Sōma Sōgō Byōin) is a public hospital in Soma, Fukushima, Japan. Founded in 1970, the hospital is one of the largest health care institution in northeast Fukushima. It serves the cities of Soma, Shinchi, and surrounding municipalities, with a combined population of more than 130,000 residents.

== Facilities and operations ==
Soma General Hospital has 240 beds and is the only hospital in Soma that provides full-time otolaryngological medical care. The hospital is also a teaching facility for medical professionals including resident physicians and nurses.

Departments include Internal Medicine (Cardiology, Endocrinology and Metabolism, Gastroenterology, General Internal Medicine, Hematology, Hepatology, Nephrology, Psychosomatic Medicine, Respiratory Medicine, and Rheumatology), Surgery (Cardiovascular Surgery, General Surgery, Neurosurgery, and Plastic Surgery), Dermatology, Laboratory Medicine, Nutrition, Obstetrics and Gynecology, Ophthalmology, Orthopedics, Otolaryngology, Pediatrics, Physical Medicine and Rehabilitation, Radiology, Urology, Coronary Care Unit, Emergency Room, Intensive Care Unit, and Neonatal Intensive Care Unit.

== 2011 Tōhoku earthquake, tsunami, and nuclear disaster ==
The 2011 Tōhoku earthquake and tsunami caused serious damage to various areas of the Pacific coast in northeast Japan, and Fukushima faced fears of meltdown of the reactors at the Fukushima Daiichi Nuclear Power Plant. Located approximately 40 km north of the nuclear power plant, Soma General Hospital acted as a key regional hospital, although neighboring hospitals were shut down immediately after the disaster.

== Access ==
Soma General Hospital is located 5 minutes by car from Sōma Station. There are also direct bus routes from the station. Parking is provided next to the hospital, connected to the hospital building via a passageway.

== Births ==
- Erica Parsons (murder victim).
