= Shinchi Shell Mound - Tenagamyō Jinja Site =

Archaeological site in Japan

- 新地貝塚附手長明神社跡 (Japanese)
- Shinchi Shell Mound - Tenagamyō Jinja Site Shinchi Shell Mound - Tenagamyō Jinja Site (Japan)
- 37°51′52″N 140°54′56″E
- Type: Shell Midden
- Location: Shinchi, Fukushima, Japan
- Region: Tōhoku region

History
- Built: Jōmon period

Site notes
- Public access: Yes (no facilities)

Shinchi Shell Midden - Tenagamyō Jinja Site (新地貝塚附手長明神社跡, Shinchi kaizuka tsuketari Tenagamyō Jinja ato) is an archaeological site containing a Jōmon period shell midden located in what is now part of the town of Shinchi, Fukushima in the southern Tōhoku region of Japan. The site was designated a National Historic Site of Japan in 1930.

== Overview ==
During the early to middle Jōmon period (approximately 4000 to 2500 BC), sea levels were five to six meters higher than at present, and the ambient temperature was also 2 deg C higher. During this period, the Tōhoku region was inhabited by the Jōmon people, many of whom lived in coastal settlements. The middens associated with such settlements contain bone, botanical material, mollusc shells, sherds, lithics, and other artifacts and ecofacts associated with the now-vanished inhabitants, and these features, provide a useful source into the diets and habits of Jōmon society.

Most of these middens are found along the Pacific coast of Japan, and the rocky ria coast from Iwate through northern Fukushima Prefecture was densely settled from the early through late Jōmon period. The site is located in a rural area near the Pacific Ocean. The midden has been known since at least the Edo Period. Sakuma Yoshikazu, a local scholar, described it a journal listing the holdings of the Date clan. compiled at the order of the 4th daimyō of Sendai Domain, Date Tsunamura. Per this account, a small Shinto shrine near this midden was dedicated to the kami of Mount Kare, a 430-meter mountain to the west of town. A giant, the "Tenaga Myojin" lived on the mountain and had very long arms - so long that it could reach the ocean to pick up shellfish (its favorite food), whose shells it would deposit on what became the Shinchi Shell Midden.

The shell midden attracted attention from archaeologists in the Meiji period and initial excavations were conducted in 1890 and in 1924 by Tokyo Imperial University. In addition to the expected shells and animal and fish bones, the midden was found to contain a unique design of pottery with ruffled decoration which was dubbed "Shichi-style pottery". The shell midden dates from approximately 4000 years ago. The Shinto shrine disappeared around 1887, but its foundations were discovered.

The site has a stone marker and explanatory signboard. It is located about 30 minutes on foot from Shinchi Station on the JR East Joban Line.

== See also ==
- List of Historic Sites of Japan (Fukushima)
