= Arcangelo Ianelli =

Brazilian artist (1922–2009)

- Born: 18 July 1922; São Paulo, Brazil
- Died: 26 May 2009 (aged 86); São Paulo, Brazil
- Known for: Painter

Arcangelo Ianelli (July 18, 1922 in São Paulo – May 26, 2009) was a painter, sculptor and illustrator from Brazil, who was involved with an artistic group called Grupo Guanabara, along with Manabu Mabe (1924–1997), Yoshiya Takaoka (1909–1978) and Tikashi Fukushima (1920–2001). His brother, Tomás Ianelli, was also a painter. He was the father of the painter Rubens Ianelli and grandfather of the poet Mariana Ianelli.

His work and style is briefly described in the 2019 novel Fake Like Me by Barbara Bourland.

== See also ==
- List of Brazilian painters

== Bibliography ==
- ALMEIDA, Paulo Mendes de. Ianelli: do figurativo ao abstrato. Presentation Aracy Amaral; texts by Aracy Amaral; Juan Acha; Marc Berkowitz; Jacob Klintowitz. São Paulo, 1978.
