= Tadashi Kaminagai =

Japanese painter (1899-1982)

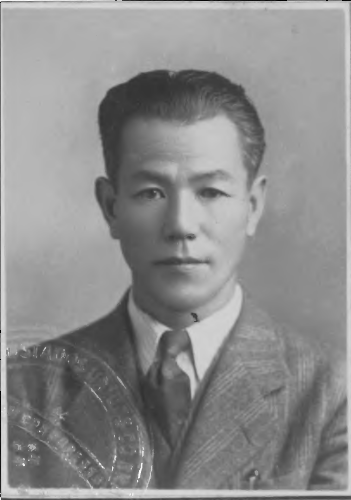
- Born: 1899; Hiroshima, Japan
- Died: 1982 (aged 82–83); Paris, France
- Occupations: Painter, draftsman and mold maker

Tadashi Kaminagai (Hiroshima, Japan, 1899 - Paris, France, 1982) was a Japanese painter, draftsman and mold maker who traveled through many countries and produced his works mainly in Japan, Brazil, and France, where he also had exhibitions. Before becoming a painter, Kaminagai followed the monastic life, first in Japan and then in the Dutch East Indies, now Indonesia, until he abandoned his life as a Buddhist monk to become an artist. He was successful as a modurer, with a series of works for famous artists, but later became known also for his work as a painter. He influenced artists and was the teacher of some of them. His works were presented in national and international exhibitions. Furthermore, he participated in the Seibi-kai, having contact with numerous painters, including many of Japanese origin.

== Career ==
He was born in Hiroshima, in 1899. Encouraged by his family, he entered a Buddhist monastery in Kobe at the age of 14. Two years later, he traveled to the Dutch East Indies, now Indonesia, where he worked as a missionary and farmer until 1927, when he decided to follow an artistic career, moving to Paris, where he met the artist Tsuguharu Foujita, who guided him in painting. Alongside his artistic activity, he worked as a framer and became recognized when he framed masterpieces by Édouard Manet, Paul Cézanne, and Vincent van Gogh. Among the artists who commissioned Kaminagai's frames were Henri Matisse, Kees van Dongen, Chaïm Soutine and Marc Chagall. Another fact that made the frames famous was their use by the writer and art dealer Ambroise Vollard. This encouraged Kaminagai to inscribe some of his paintings in Parisian salons.

In the early 1930s, he exhibited in Parisian salons, such as the Salon d'Automne and the Salon des Tuileries. He returned to Japan in 1938, but Foujita's advice made him move to Brazil after the outbreak of World War II, arriving in the country on the same day Japan attacked Pearl Harbor, bringing with him a letter of recommendation addressed to Candido Portinari. In Brazil he lived for a period of 14 years, settling in Rio de Janeiro. In 1941, he set up a studio and framing workshop in the Santa Teresa neighborhood, on the first floor of a building where the painter Djanira da Motta e Silva had a boarding house. There, he worked and taught several Brazilian and Japanese-Brazilian artists, such as Inimá de Paula, Flávio Shiró, Tikashi Fukushima, and others.

In the 1940s Kaminagai's art influenced many artists, including his countrymen. In 1945, the painter Tikashi Fukushima was living in São Paulo and working in a workshop when he was introduced to Kaminagai by his boss, who at the time was in need of an assistant in a frame shop in Rio de Janeiro. Fukushima accepted to work for Kaminagai, and in 1946 he moved to Santa Teresa. Kaminagai was important to Fukushima's artistic formation; he was seen as his master. Fukushima would spend hours listening to Kaminagai's stories about how he survived in Paris and exhibited in salons in the 1930s. They would also go fishing together and take hours to reach a place considered by them to be special. This place enchanted Fukushima and inspired him to make his first painting made in Brazil, in Rio de Janeiro in 1946 and titled "Landscape". In 1996, Tikashi gave a statement to journalist Kuniko Kobayashi of the São Paulo-Shimbun newspaper, in which he said: "That moment was sublimation. And it consolidated my trajectory as a plastic artist."

Around 1945, Portinari organized Kaminagai's first solo exhibition, which took place at the Hotel Serrador in Rio de Janeiro. In the same year, Hiroshima was bombed and Kaminagai lost his parents. In 1947 he joined the Seibi-kai, and in 1951 he traveled through Uruguay and Argentina. In the same year he participated in the I International São Paulo Art Biennial, and the following year his work was presented in the 1st National Salon of Modern Art. In 1952 he met Manabu Mabe, who was an admirer of Kaminagai's art. Mabe tells that he spent hours next to the artist "admiring the wonderful colors with which he painted a macaw, on the veranda of Doctor Honda's house. Cândido Portinari also praised Kaminagai's work, saying that he "carried out his true training as an authentic artist during 15 years of study in Paris. His austere, simple painting, inspired by nature, is clothed with appreciable qualities". At the II São Paulo Art Biennial, in 1953, only two Japanese-Brazilian artists were accepted, Kaminagai and Manabu Mabe. In the same year, Tadashi went to Belem, as an official guest of the government of Pará, to paint the landscapes of the Amazon.

According to historian Aracy Amaral, the colors of the Brazilian landscape had a great impact on Kaminagai's work, who said: "I like to travel a lot because of my way of life. When you travel and get to know the things of the place, especially the nature that makes us feel, it is important to try to transmit these feelings. But I don't consider myself a wanderer, but a needy one. Traveling is a necessity of work".

He returned to Japan in 1954, and three years later he settled back in Paris. According to the artist himself, from 1955 on, he began to paint with his own style, expressing his art making use of the freedom of expression to any object. The artist synthesized his thought with the following sentence: "I work based on the meaning a landscape may have for me, because if the painting follows exactly what one visualizes, it is better to abandon the brush and get a camera. I look at what I am going to paint just to get the form, and the best work is usually the one done quickly, when the images are still in my head". According to the newspaper O Estado de S. Paulo, Kaminagai is "one of the last representatives of the bohemian life that artists led in Paris", because he had no time to work and often spent all night to get a new color for the painting.

Kaminagai was also important to the painter Jorge Mori, who, since childhood, already had an ability to paint and was introduced to Kaminagai through Portinari. According to columnist Jorge Coli "the cases of child prodigies in music are frequent, but rare in painting. Jorge Mori's self-portrait, which dates from 1944, leaves one speechless. It's hard to believe that this haughty 11-year-old boy could have produced such a phenomenal painting. There is sincerity, energy, mature and unhesitating mastery of the craft". In 1952, when Mori went to Paris, Kaminagai recommended him in a letter to Foujita. In Mori's words "Foujita talked about everything but painting, but Kaminagai was different, he really taught me how to live".

In 1958, Tadashi Kaminagai is described as an "artist of greater production and greater gifts", who at that time had returned to Japan, and created paintings inspired by Brazil, with both urban and rural themes. 1958 is also the year of the birth of his son, Yo Kaminagai and according to Tadashi's wife, Mineko, "his colors became more vibrant after his stay in Brazil, but especially after the birth of our son", which means that his son influenced him in painting. For two consecutive years he exhibited his work at the Latin American Salon in Paris, in 1958 and 1959.

From 1973 until his death he traveled frequently to Brazil. About an exhibition of Kaminagai's works in 1977, it was published that a good part of the artist's works were influenced by the "impressive power of the colors and light of the Brazilian landscape," and that "he can be considered a direct descendant of the masters of French post-impressionism," such as Pierre Bonnard, André Derain, Albert Marquet, and Raoul Dufy. He was also considered to be one of the last living Impressionists of the French school. In 1981, Kaminagai presented his works at the Latin American Salon and in 1982 he died of intestinal cancer at the Vaugirard Hospital. Kaminagai requested that when he died part of his ashes stay in Brazil.

== After his death ==
Soon after his death, an exhibition was organized, and the critic José Roberto Teixeira Leite said that "his influence on Brazilian art cannot be disregarded. He exerted a profound influence not only on a group of young (now famous) Japanese artists, but also on some painters who assimilated his style at one point in their evolution".

Marinho de Azevedo from Veja magazine describes Kaminagai as an artist who "painted with a pleasure that explodes in each of his canvases". In the same issue, Azevedo also mentions that the artist "did not give in, in the 50s, to the temptations of abstractionism. He kept painting landscapes, flowers, and figures, which gradually made him go out of fashion". As for his painting style, Azevedo wrote that "with strong tones, marked brushstrokes, and loose strokes, he creates a vigorous world. Fascinated by landscapes, Kaminagai painted them all with a similar palette - so his Amazon is not far from France. However, in every canvas, color reigns supreme. From the French scenes to the house gate in Rio or the light-filled interiors, in everything a happy life shines and a brush stroke with emphasis and sensitivity asserts itself".

Several exhibitions were organized after Kaminagai's death. One of them, held at MASP, received the comment of art critic Mário Pedrosa, who said that Kaminagai's work "is made of milestones of spontaneous realizations that appear and evaporate soon after. He is not, however, an eclectic who looks for elements or strange and opposing inspirations to organize his bric-à-brac".

In 1986, an article entitled "Do nazismo às galerias de arte" (English: From Nazism to art galleries) was published in the newspaper O Estado de S. Paulo for the exhibitions called "Tempos de Guerra" (English: War Times), where Angélica de Moraes defines that "two dozen artists coming from abroad helped push Brazil towards modernity". Among the artists from Japan she mentions Tadashi Kaminagai and Tikashi Fukushima, and adds that the Japanese had an extra difficulty due to the suspicion that they were spies in the service of the Axis.

In 1996, set designer Márcio Augusto Neiva confessed to the police that he used to forge paintings at the request of painter Giuseppe Irlandini, who delivered photographs to Márcio and paid US$200 for each reproduction. Among the works were the Kaminagai paintings.

In 2008, there was the exhibition called "Círculo de Ligações: Foujita no Brasil, Kaminagai e o Jovem Mori" (English: Circle of Connections: Foujita in Brazil, Kaminagai and the Young Mori), curated by Aracy Amaral. In the same year there was also the launching of the book written by Aracy, with the same title as the exhibition. In the same exposition there was also a section of documents, with photographs of the artists in Brazil, newspapers of the time, caricatures and manuscripts, with highlight to the letter that Foujita wrote to Portinari presenting Kaminagai.

In the 2010 book "Arte brasileira: cortes e recortes: leilão de maio de 2010" (English: Brazilian Art: Cuts and Clippings: May 2010 Auction) by Frederico Morais, the author describes the style and intensity of Kaminagai's work as follows: "The Fauve painter was a typical representative of the School of Paris, expressing his themes, above all, through color, which was always vibrant in him. He carried his painting with a lyricism that is, at the same time, a lesson of deep love for life. From then on, the presence of the landscape, along with another recurring theme, the flower, symbol of his attachment to life, friends, family, and, above all, to painting itself, a source of pleasure and joy. He knew how to capture and transmit in his paintings the diversity of our landscape: the green and quietness of the Amazon, the bustle and brightness of Rio de Janeiro's beaches, the colorful architecture of Salvador and São Luís. He never held back from this diverse landscape that moved him".

== Bibliography ==
- MORAIS, Frederico (2010). Arte brasileira: cortes e recortes: leilão de maio de 2010. Rio de Janeiro: Atlântica Business Center.
- MORENO, Leila Yaeko Kiyomura (2012). Dissertação apresentada para obtenção do Título de Mestre em Estética e História da Arte intitulada: Tikashi Fukushima: um sonho em quatro estações (Estudo sobre o Ma no processo de criação do artista nipo-brasileiro). University of São Paulo, São Paulo: USP.
