= Sōma, Fukushima =

Sōma 相馬市
- City
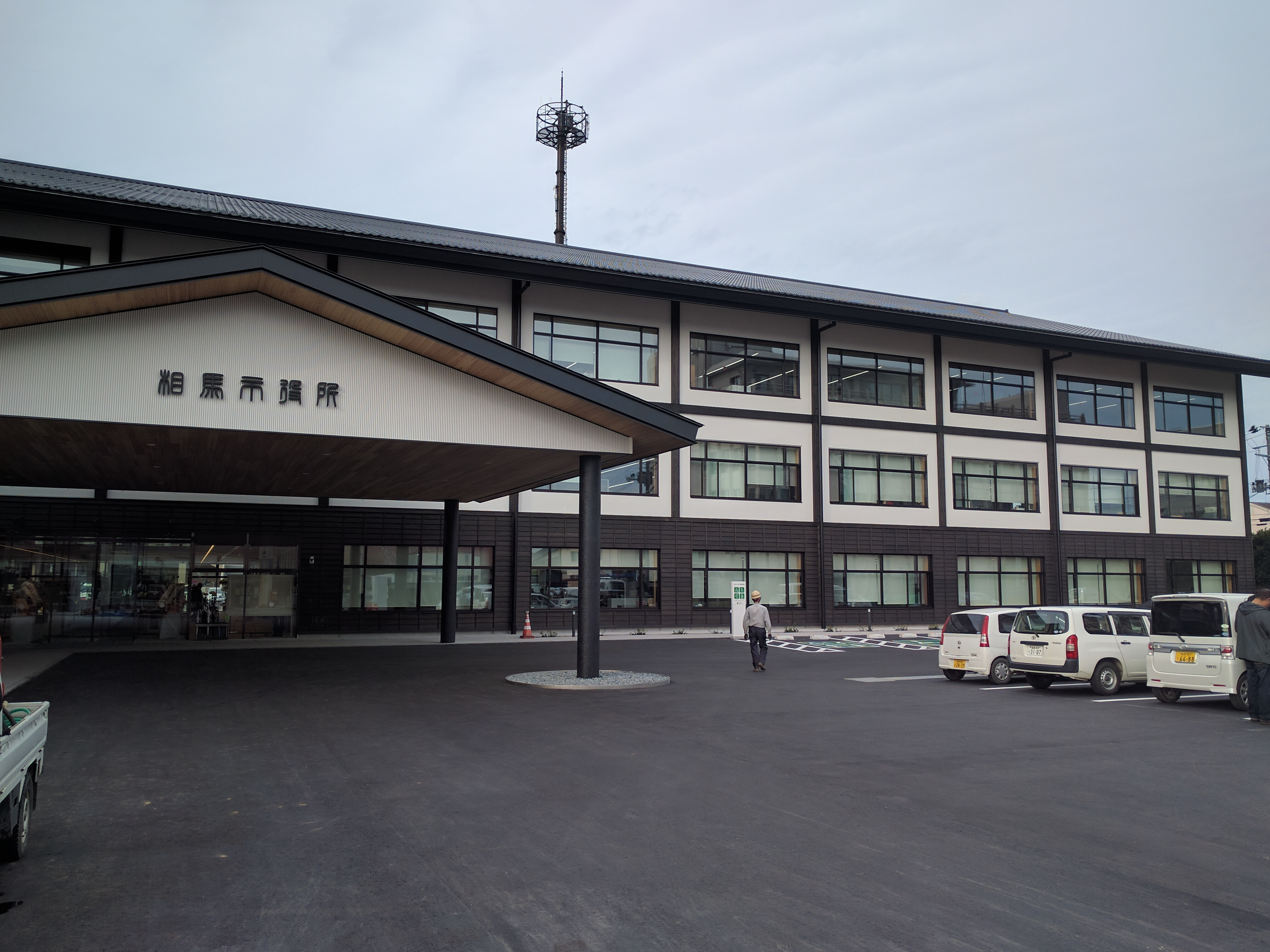
- Sōma City Hall

- Flag Emblem

- Location of Sōma in Fukushima Prefecture

- Coordinates: 37°47′48″N 140°55′10.7″E
- Country: Japan
- Region: Tōhoku
- Prefecture: Fukushima

Government
  - Mayor: Hidekiyo Tachiya

Area
  - Total: 197.79 km^{2} (76.37 sq mi)

Population (February 29, 2020)
  - Total: 34,631
  - Density: 175.09/km^{2} (453.48/sq mi)
- Time zone: UTC+09:00 (Japan Standard Time)
- Phone number: 0244-37-2117
- Address: 13 Nakamura Ōtesaki, Sōma-shi, Fukushima-ken 976-8601
- Climate: Cfa
- Website: Official website
- Symbols
- Bird: Japanese bush warbler
- Flower: Spring: sakura Summer: rugosa rose Autumn: balloon flower Winter: sazanka
- Tree: Japanese black pine

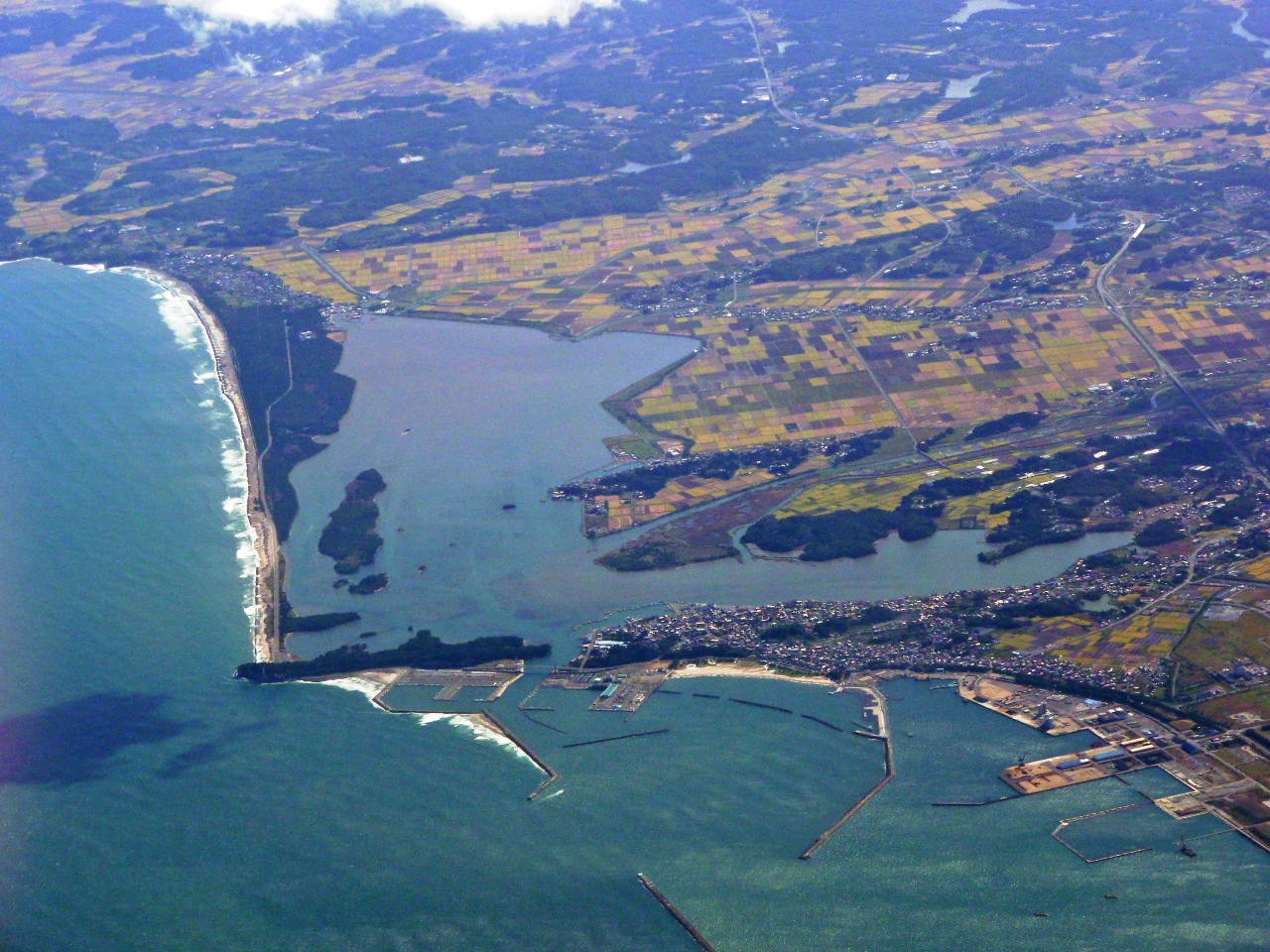
Matsukawaura Lagoon

Sōma (相馬市, Sōma-shi) is a city located in Fukushima Prefecture, Japan. As of 29 February 2020, the city had an estimated population of 34,631, and a population density of 180 persons per km^{2} in 14,358 households. The total area of the city is 197.79 square kilometres (76.37 sq mi).

== Geography ==
Sōma is located in northeastern Fukushima Prefecture, bordered by the Pacific Ocean to the east and the Abukuma Plateau to the west. Sōma is closer to Sendai in Miyagi Prefecture than it is to the prefectural capital of Fukushima.

- Mountains
  - Mount Ryōzen (825m)
- Rivers
  - Uda River
- Coastal features
  - Matsukawa Lagoon

=== Neighboring municipalities ===
- Fukushima Prefecture
  - Date
  - Iitate
  - Minamisōma
  - Shinchi
- Miyagi Prefecture
  - Marumori

=== Climate ===
Sōma has a humid climate (Köppen climate classification Cfa) characterized by mild summers and cold winters with heavy snowfall. The average annual temperature in Sōma is 12.6 °C. The average annual rainfall is 1260 mm with September as the wettest month. The temperatures are highest on average in August, at around 24.8 °C, and lowest in January, at around 1.8 °C.

Climate data for Sōma (elevation 9 m, 1991–2020 normals, extremes 1976–present)
Month	Jan	Feb	Mar	Apr	May	Jun	Jul	Aug	Sep	Oct	Nov	Dec	Year
Record high °C (°F)	18.4 (65.1)	22.7 (72.9)	26.0 (78.8)	31.0 (87.8)	33.3 (91.9)	36.3 (97.3)	36.8 (98.2)	37.6 (99.7)	36.3 (97.3)	31.1 (88.0)	26.5 (79.7)	23.0 (73.4)	37.6 (99.7)
Mean daily maximum °C (°F)	6.7 (44.1)	7.3 (45.1)	10.6 (51.1)	15.8 (60.4)	20.4 (68.7)	23.0 (73.4)	26.6 (79.9)	28.2 (82.8)	25.0 (77.0)	20.0 (68.0)	14.8 (58.6)	9.5 (49.1)	17.3 (63.1)
Daily mean °C (°F)	2.2 (36.0)	2.5 (36.5)	5.4 (41.7)	10.5 (50.9)	15.5 (59.9)	19.0 (66.2)	22.7 (72.9)	24.2 (75.6)	20.8 (69.4)	15.4 (59.7)	9.7 (49.5)	4.7 (40.5)	12.7 (54.9)
Mean daily minimum °C (°F)	−2.5 (27.5)	−2.3 (27.9)	0.0 (32.0)	5.0 (41.0)	10.9 (51.6)	15.6 (60.1)	19.7 (67.5)	20.8 (69.4)	17.1 (62.8)	10.8 (51.4)	4.4 (39.9)	−0.1 (31.8)	8.2 (46.8)
Record low °C (°F)	−11.9 (10.6)	−14.0 (6.8)	−9.7 (14.5)	−5.4 (22.3)	1.6 (34.9)	7.3 (45.1)	11.7 (53.1)	12.5 (54.5)	7.3 (45.1)	−0.7 (30.7)	−3.9 (25.0)	−9.2 (15.4)	−14.0 (6.8)
Average precipitation mm (inches)	47.4 (1.87)	34.6 (1.36)	77.8 (3.06)	97.4 (3.83)	113.0 (4.45)	146.9 (5.78)	190.8 (7.51)	166.8 (6.57)	225.0 (8.86)	198.8 (7.83)	60.3 (2.37)	34.9 (1.37)	1,381.2 (54.38)
Average precipitation days (≥ 1.0 mm)	4.2	4.9	7.9	8.5	9.2	12.5	13.7	11.7	11.9	8.7	5.8	4.8	104.0
Mean monthly sunshine hours	180.3	175.5	193.2	193.7	192.2	147.5	132.8	156.8	129.1	144.2	152.9	163.9	1,961.9
Source: Japan Meteorological Agency (1991–2020 normals, extremes 1976–present)

== Demographics ==
Per Japanese census data, the population of Sōma has remained the same over the past 40 years.

Historical population
Year	Pop.	±%
1920	27,858	—
1930	31,627	+13.5%
1940	31,887	+0.8%
1950	44,375	+39.2%
1960	41,352	−6.8%
1970	37,189	−10.1%
1980	37,332	+0.4%
1990	39,134	+4.8%
2000	38,842	−0.7%
2010	37,817	−2.6%
2020	34,631	−8.4%

== History ==
The area of present-day Sōma was part of ancient Mutsu Province, and has been settled since at least the Jōmon period. During the Edo period, the area developed as the castle town of Sōma Domain, home of the Sōma clan from the Kamakura period until the Boshin War. After the Meiji Restoration, it was organized as part of Iwaki Province. With the establishment of the modern municipalities system on April 1, 1896, the area was organized into a number of towns and villages within the districts of Namekata and Uda. In 1896, Namekata and Uda were merged to create Sōma District. The town of Nakamura was established on April 1, 1889. Nakamura was merged with seven neighbouring villages and raised to city status on March 31, 1954, becoming the city of Sōma.

=== 2011 earthquake and tsunami ===
The eastern, coastal portion of Sōma was inundated by tsunami floodwaters following the magnitude 9.1 2011 Tōhoku earthquake and tsunami off its coastline on March 11, 2011. The tsunami reached up to approximately 4 km inland in Sōma; flooded areas included Sōma Port and the Matsukawa-ura Bay area, up to the elevated Route 6 Sōma Bypass. The tsunami was measured to have been 9.3 meters or higher in Sōma.

Sōma is about 45 kilometres (28 miles) north of Fukushima Daiichi Nuclear Power Plant, the site of the nuclear accident that followed the tsunami, and was thus not subject to mandatory evacuation.

== Government ==
Sōma has a mayor-council form of government with a directly elected mayor and a unicameral city legislature of 20 members. Sōma, together with the town of Shinchi contributes one member to the Fukushima Prefectural Assembly. In terms of national politics, the city is part of Fukushima 1st district of the lower house of the Diet of Japan.

== Economy ==
Sōma has a mixed economy, based on agriculture, commercial fishing and light manufacturing. The area is noted for its strawberry cultivation. The Shinchi Thermal Power Station, a coal-fired thermal power station is located in Sōma.

== Education ==
Sōma has nine public elementary schools and four public junior high schools operated by the city and two public high schools operated by the Fukushima Prefectural Board of Education. The prefecture also operates one special education school.

== Hospital ==
Soma General Hospital, a public hospital with 240 beds, is located in Sōma.

== Transportation ==
=== Railway ===
East Japan Railway Company (JR East) - Jōban Line

- Nittaki - Soma

=== Highway ===
- Jōban Expressway – Sōma Interchange
- Tōhoku-Chūō Expressway – Sōma Interchange – Sōma Yamakami Interchange – Sōma Tamano Interchange
- National Route 6
- National Route 115
- National Route 116

=== Seaports ===
- Port of Soma

== Local attractions ==
- Matsukawaura Prefectural Natural Park
- Mount Ryōzen, National Place of Scenic Beauty and a National Historic Site
- The Sōma horse-chasing Festival held on July 23 to 25 every year is a designated an Important Intangible Folk Cultural Property.
- Sōma Nakamura Castle ruins
- Sōma Nakamura Shrine

== Noted people from Sōma ==
- Tikashi Fukushima, artist.
- Takahiro Suzuki, professional baseball player
- Tochiazuma Tomoyori, sumo wrestler
