= Komagamine Station =

Railway station in Shinchi, Fukushima Prefecture, Japan

Komagamine Station 駒ヶ嶺駅
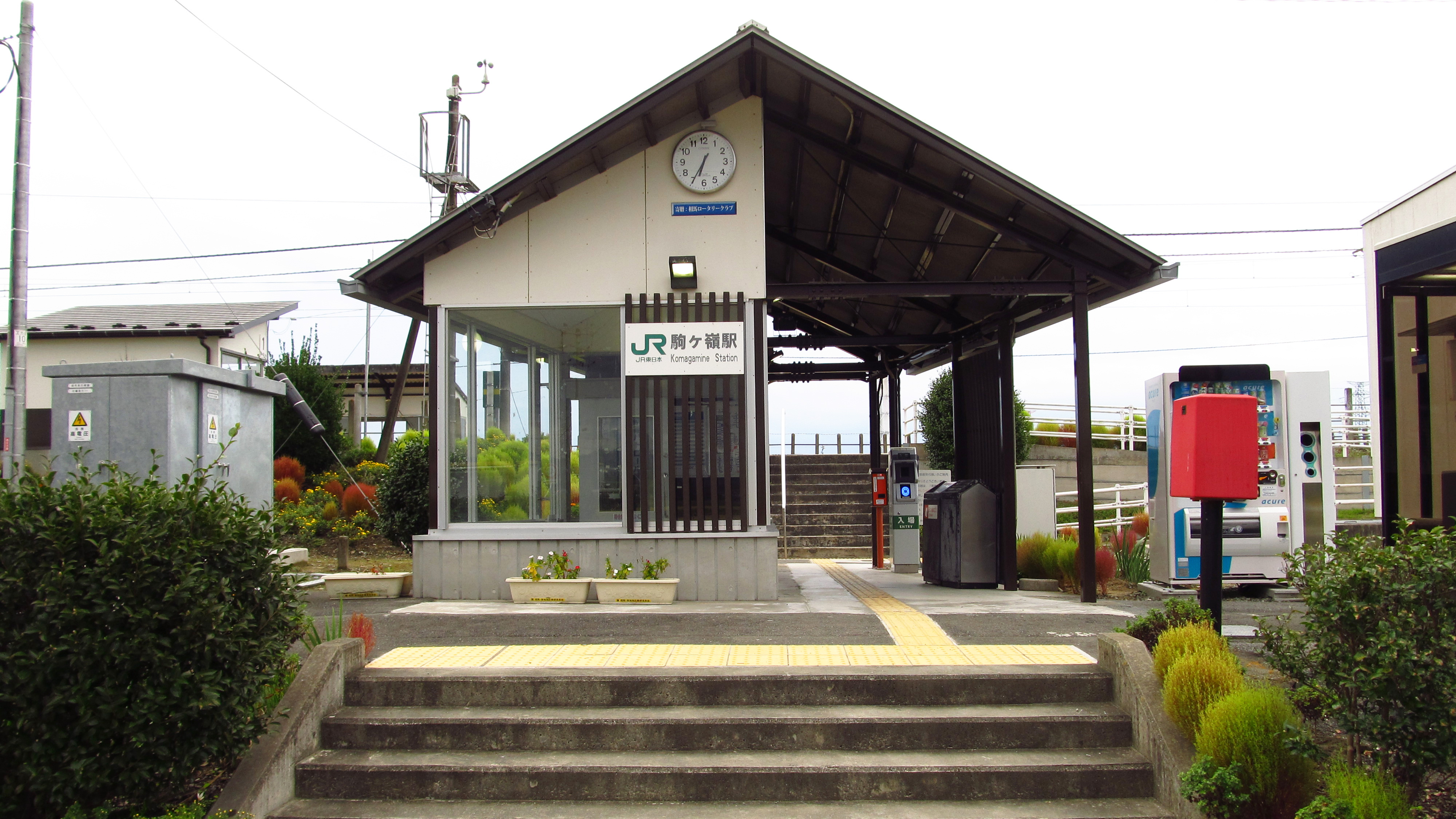
- Komagamine Station in October 2017

General information
- Location: Komagamine, Shinchi-machi, Sōma-gun, Fukushima-ken 979-2611; Japan
- Coordinates: 37.8426°N 140.9250°E
- Operator: JR East
- Line: ■ Jōban Line
- Distance: 311.4 km from Nippori
- Platforms: 2 side platforms
- Tracks: 2

Other information
- Status: Unstaffed
- Website: Official website

History
- Opened: 10 July 1952

Passengers
- 2004: 151 daily

Services
Preceding station	JR East	Following station
Sōma towards Shinagawa	Jōban Line Local-Futsu	Shinchi towards Sendai
Location
- Location within Fukushima Prefecture Location within Japan

Komagamine Station (駒ヶ嶺駅, Komagamine-eki) is a railway station in the town of Shinchi, Fukushima Prefecture, Japan, operated by East Japan Railway Company (JR East).

== Lines ==
Komagamine Station was served by the Jōban Line, and was located 311.4 kilometers from the official starting point of the line at Nippori in Tokyo.

== Station layout ==
The station has two opposed side platforms connected to the station building by a footbridge. The station is unstaffed and Suica can be used.

=== Platforms ===
1	■ Jōban Line	for Iwanuma and Sendai
2	■ Jōban Line	for Sōma and Haranomachi

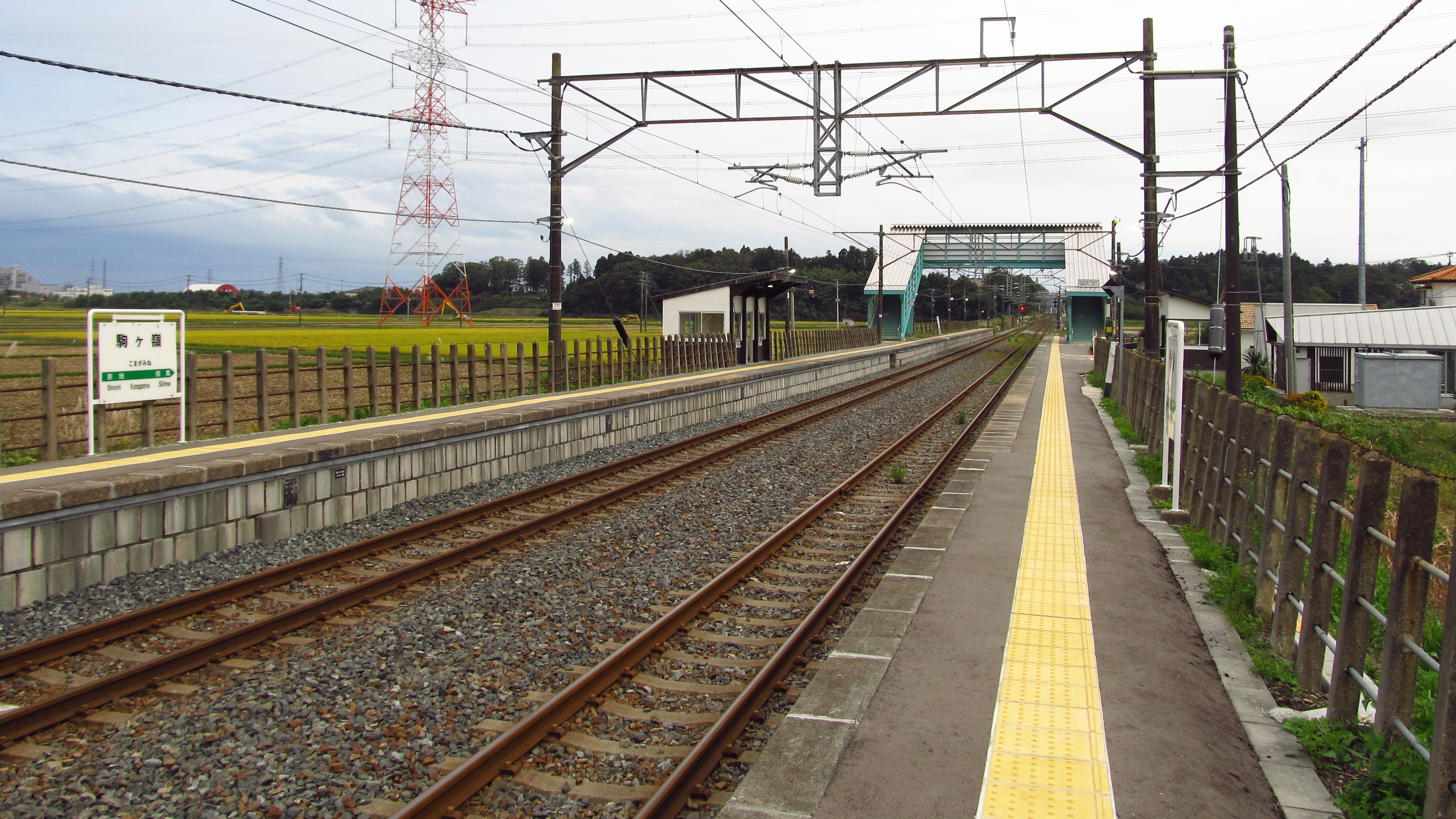
The station platforms in October 2017

== History ==
Komagamine Station opened on July 10, 1952. The station was absorbed into the JR East network upon the privatization of the Japanese National Railways (JNR) on April 1, 1987.

The station building escaped serious damage from the 2011 Tōhoku earthquake and tsunami on 11 March 2011, but the tracks and adjacent stations were destroyed, and services were suspended. The station reopened on 10 December 2016.

== Surrounding area ==
- National Route 6
- National Route 113
- Komagamine post office
- Soma Port

== See also ==
- List of railway stations in Japan
