= Shinchi, Fukushima =

Shinchi 新地町
- Town
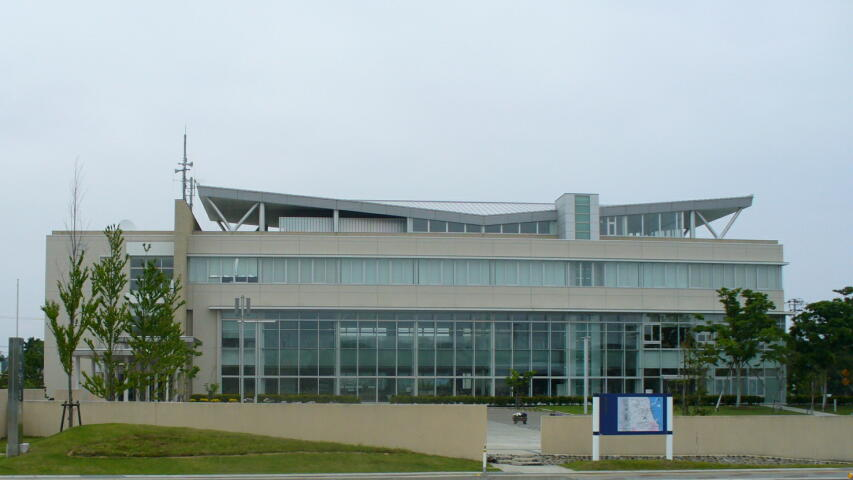
- Shinchi Town Hall

- Flag Seal

- Location of Shinchi in Fukushima Prefecture

- Coordinates: 37°52′34.7″N 140°55′10.6″E
- Country: Japan
- Region: Tōhoku
- Prefecture: Fukushima Prefecture
- District: Sōma

Area
  - Total: 46.70 km^{2} (18.03 sq mi)

Population (February 2020)
  - Total: 8,152
  - Density: 174.6/km^{2} (452.1/sq mi)
- Time zone: UTC+9 (Japan Standard Time)
- Phone number: 0244-62-2111
- Address: Yachikoya, Shinchi-machi, Sōma-gun, Fukushima-ken 979-2792
- Climate: Cfa
- Website: Official website
- Symbols
- Bird: Green pheasant
- Fish: Pleuronectidae
- Flower: Sakura
- Tree: Pine

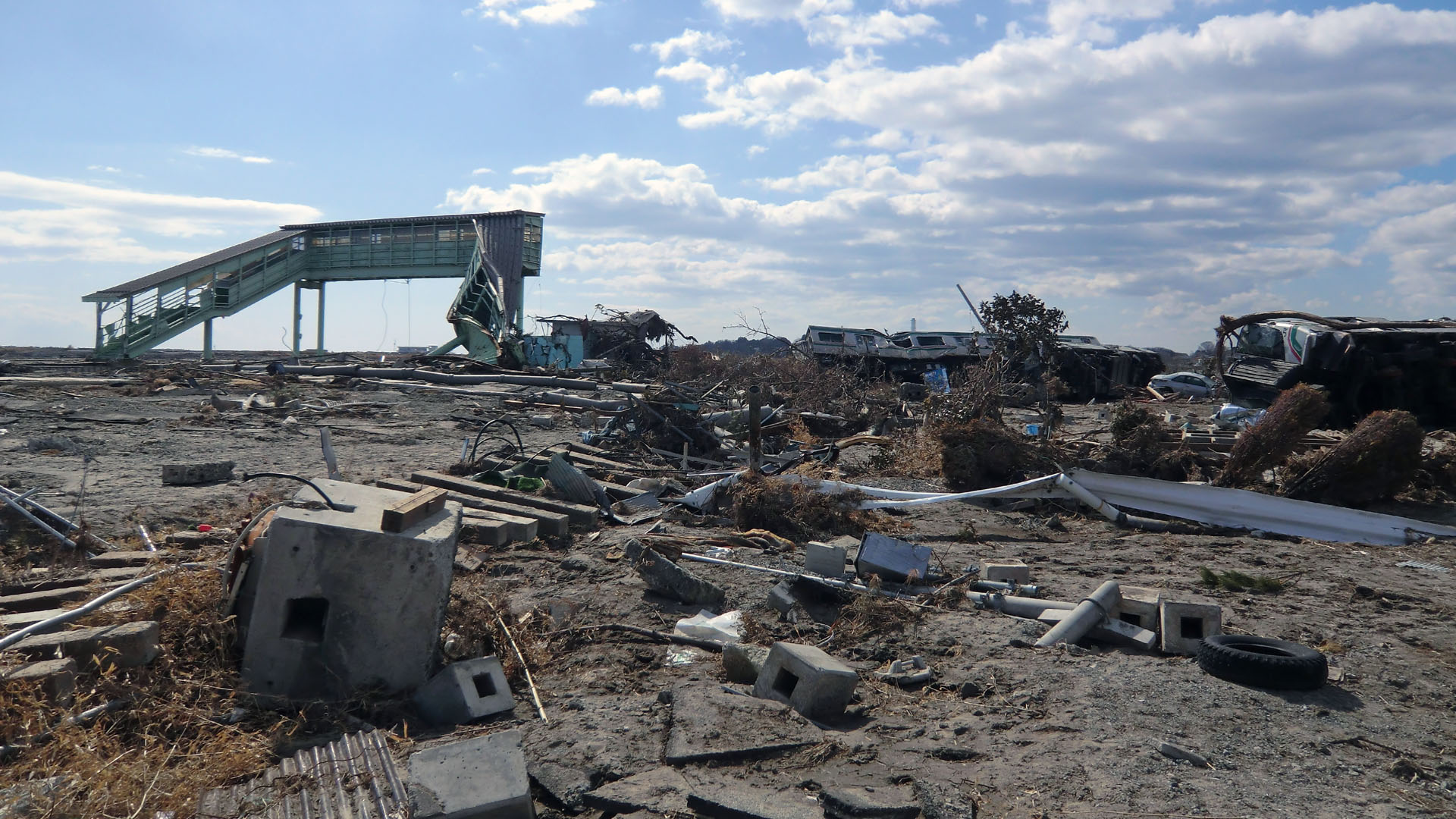
Shinchi Station after the 2011 earthquake and tsunami

Shinchi (新地町, Shinchi-machi) is a town located in Fukushima Prefecture, Japan. As of 1 February 2020, the town has an estimated population of 8,152, and a population density of 170 inhabitants per square kilometre (440/sq mi) in 2832 households. The total area is 46.70 square kilometres (18.03 sq mi).

== Geography ==
Shinchi is located in the far northeastern Hamadōri region of Fukushima Prefecture, bordering on Miyagi Prefecture to the north and the Pacific Ocean to the east. The population center and town hall is in the northern part of the town, and the western part of the town is hilly.

=== Surrounding municipalities ===
Fukushima Prefecture

- Sōma

Miyagi Prefecture

- Marumori
- Yamamoto

=== Climate ===
Shinchi has a humid subtropical climate (Köppen climate classification Cfa). The average annual temperature in Shinchi is 12.5 °C (54.5 °F). The average annual rainfall is 1,259 mm (49.6 in) with September as the wettest month. The temperatures are highest on average in August, at around 24.7 °C (76.5 °F), and lowest in January, at around 1.6 °C (34.9 °F).

Climate data for Shinchi (2011−2020 normals, extremes 2011−present)
| Month | Jan | Feb | Mar | Apr | May | Jun | Jul | Aug | Sep | Oct | Nov | Dec | Year |
|---|---|---|---|---|---|---|---|---|---|---|---|---|---|
| Record high °C (°F) | 14.9 (58.8) | 20.8 (69.4) | 23.2 (73.8) | 29.9 (85.8) | 31.1 (88.0) | 36.0 (96.8) | 36.8 (98.2) | 36.2 (97.2) | 33.4 (92.1) | 30.2 (86.4) | 24.8 (76.6) | 19.0 (66.2) | 36.8 (98.2) |
| Mean daily maximum °C (°F) | 6.3 (43.3) | 6.9 (44.4) | 10.8 (51.4) | 15.5 (59.9) | 20.9 (69.6) | 22.7 (72.9) | 26.3 (79.3) | 28.2 (82.8) | 25.0 (77.0) | 19.8 (67.6) | 14.4 (57.9) | 8.8 (47.8) | 17.1 (62.8) |
| Daily mean °C (°F) | 2.5 (36.5) | 2.8 (37.0) | 6.3 (43.3) | 10.7 (51.3) | 16.1 (61.0) | 19.0 (66.2) | 22.9 (73.2) | 24.7 (76.5) | 21.4 (70.5) | 15.9 (60.6) | 10.2 (50.4) | 4.8 (40.6) | 13.1 (55.6) |
| Mean daily minimum °C (°F) | −1.3 (29.7) | −1.1 (30.0) | 1.8 (35.2) | 6.1 (43.0) | 11.9 (53.4) | 16.0 (60.8) | 20.2 (68.4) | 21.9 (71.4) | 18.1 (64.6) | 11.9 (53.4) | 5.8 (42.4) | 0.8 (33.4) | 9.3 (48.8) |
| Record low °C (°F) | −8.0 (17.6) | −6.9 (19.6) | −3.8 (25.2) | −2.1 (28.2) | 5.1 (41.2) | 8.8 (47.8) | 15.1 (59.2) | 14.7 (58.5) | 9.9 (49.8) | 4.6 (40.3) | −2.6 (27.3) | −4.7 (23.5) | −8.0 (17.6) |
| Average precipitation mm (inches) | 49.3 (1.94) | 28.8 (1.13) | 92.6 (3.65) | 97.4 (3.83) | 109.2 (4.30) | 130.4 (5.13) | 164.3 (6.47) | 129.1 (5.08) | 236.6 (9.31) | 212.5 (8.37) | 38.8 (1.53) | 31.1 (1.22) | 1,333.1 (52.48) |
| Average precipitation days (≥ 1.0 mm) | 4.4 | 4.6 | 6.7 | 7.9 | 8.3 | 10.7 | 12.9 | 11.8 | 11.7 | 8.9 | 4.6 | 4.7 | 97.2 |
Source: Japan Meteorological Agency

== Demographics ==
Per Japanese census data, the population of Shinchi has declined slightly since the year 2000.

Historical population
| Year | Pop. | ±% |
|---|---|---|
| 1920 | 7,799 | — |
| 1930 | 8,651 | +10.9% |
| 1940 | 8,802 | +1.7% |
| 1950 | 12,060 | +37.0% |
| 1960 | 10,494 | −13.0% |
| 1970 | 8,646 | −17.6% |
| 1980 | 8,704 | +0.7% |
| 1990 | 8,904 | +2.3% |
| 2000 | 9,017 | +1.3% |
| 2010 | 8,224 | −8.8% |
| 2020 | 7,905 | −3.9% |

== History ==
The area of present-day Shinchi was part of Mutsu Province, and Kofun period remains have been found in the area. During the Nara period, it was part of ancient Futaba District in Iwaki Province. During the Edo period, it was part of Uda District, which was divided into 51 villages, nine of which (including the coast) was part of the holdings of Sendai Domain, and the remaining 42 of which were ruled by Sōma Domain, ruled by the Sōma clan under the Tokugawa shogunate until the Meiji restoration. On April 1, 1889, the village of Shinchi was created within Uda District, Fukushima with the establishment of the modern municipalities system. Uda District became Sōma District in 1896. On April 20, 1954, Shinchi annexed the neighboring villages of Fukuda and Komagamine. Shinchi was elevated to town status on August 1, 1971.

=== 2011 earthquake and tsunami ===
The eastern, coastal portion of Shinchi was inundated by tsunami flood waters following the magnitude 9.0 2011 Tōhoku earthquake and tsunami off its coastline on March 11, 2011. The tsunami destroyed 577 houses, or approximately half the homes in the town, and the final death toll was 116 residents.

== Government ==
Shinchi has a mayor-council form of government with a directly elected mayor and a unicameral town council of 12 members. Shinchi, together with the city of Soma, collectively contributes one seat to the Fukushima Prefectural legislature. In terms of national politics, the city is part of Fukushima 1st district of the lower house of the Diet of Japan.

== Economy ==
The economy of Shinchi is primarily agricultural. The Shinchi Thermal Power Station is located in the town.

== Education ==
Shinchi has three public elementary schools and one public junior high school operated by the town government, and one public high school operated by the Fukushima Prefectural Board of Education.

== Transportation ==
=== Railway ===
East Japan Railway Company (JR East) - Jōban Line

- Komagamine - Shinchi

=== Highway ===
- Jōban Expressway - Shinchi Interchange
- National Route 6
- National Route 113

== Local attractions ==
- Shinchi Shell Mound - Tenagamyō Jinja Site, a National Historic Site

== Noted people from Shinchi ==
- Arata Endo, architect
