= Béatrice Tanaka =

Béatrice Tanaka (March 1, 1932 – April 21, 2016) was a Romanian Brazilian theater designer, writer, and illustrator.

== Early life and family ==
In 1932, Béatrice Tanaka was born Béatrice Lauder in Cernăuți, in what was then Romania, now Ukraine.

Her family was Jewish, and they fled Europe for Palestine as the Nazis seized power, eventually settling in Brazil in 1947.

In the 1950s, she met the Japanese Brazilian artist Flavio-Shiró, whom she married, taking his surname, Tanaka. The couple had two children and lived between Paris and Rio de Janeiro until her 2016 death in Paris.

== Career ==
After moving to Brazil, Tanaka studied education, language, and design in Belo Horizonte. She later studied theater at the Sorbonne and other institutions in Paris.

Beginning in 1955, she worked as a scenographer and designer for the theater, largely focusing on plays for young audiences. In 1961, she was honored as best costume designer at the São Paulo Art Biennial.

Tanaka began writing for magazines in 1961. She went on to write and illustrate more than 40 books for children and adults. She was inspired to write her first book, Le Trésor de l'Homme : contes et images du Viet Nam, in 1971, in response to the Vietnam War.

She had a particular interest in folk tales and popular culture. Among her books are several in French on Brazilian culture: La Légende de Chico Rei, Contes et Mythes des Indiens du Brésil, and Contes Afro-Brésiliens.

In 2010, she published Sous d’étranges étoiles, a memoir of her youth.
