= Matsukawaura Prefectural Natural Park =

Natural park of Fukushima prefecture, Japan

Coordinates: 37°47′53″N 140°58′32″E

- 松川浦県立自然公園
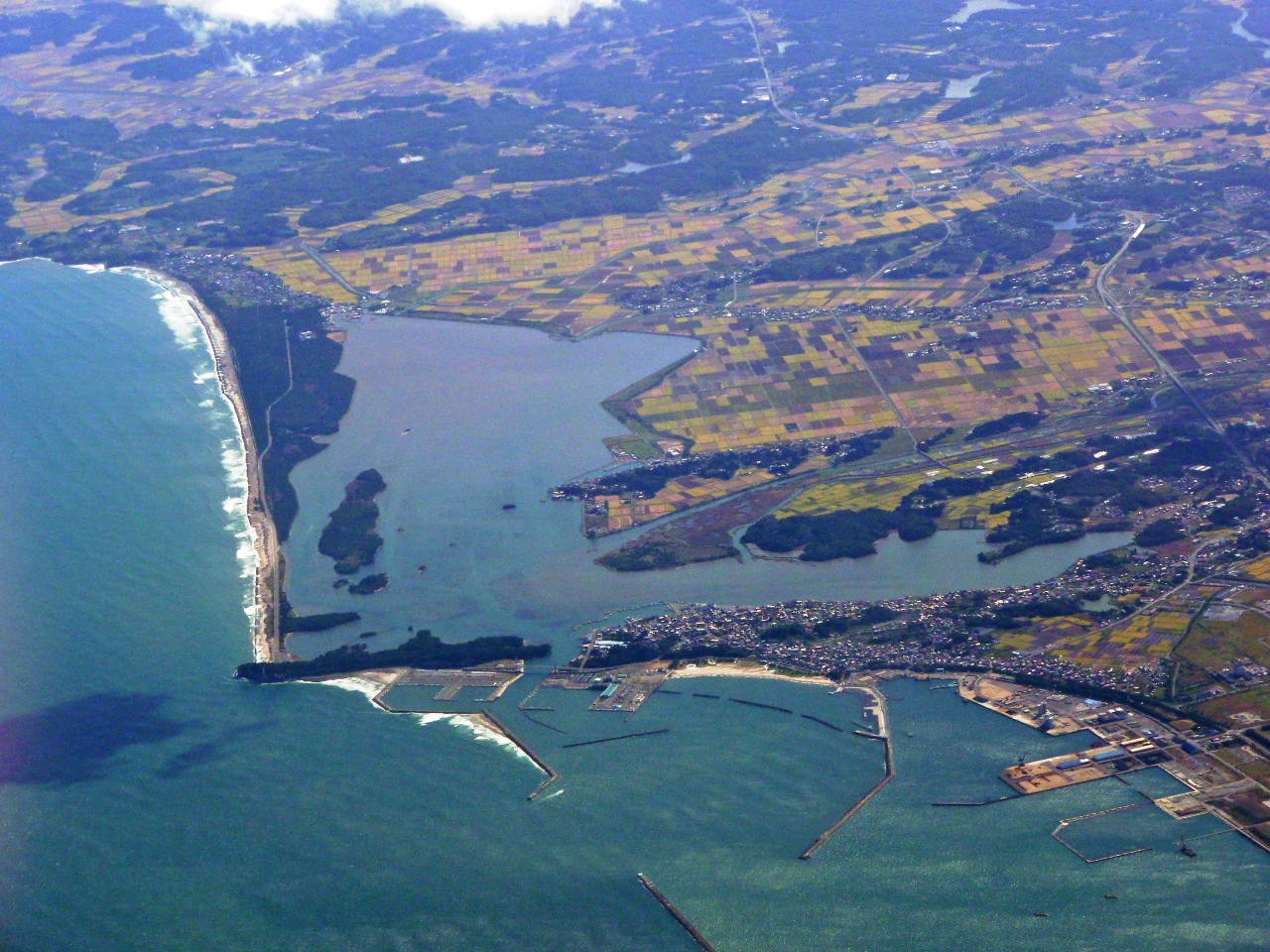
- Matsukawa-ura
- Interactive map of Matsukawaura Prefectural Natural Park
- Location: Fukushima Prefecture, Japan
- Nearest city: Sōma
- Area: 9.79 km^{2} (3.78 sq mi)
- Established: 27 March 1951

Matsukawaura Prefectural Natural Park (松川浦県立自然公園, Matsukawa-ura kenritsu shizen-kōen) is a Prefectural Natural Park in Sōma, Fukushima Prefecture, Japan. The park was established in 1951. Matsukawa Bay (松川浦) is celebrated for its nori and saltwater clams and in 1927 was selected as one of the 100 Famous Views of Japan.

== See also ==
- National Parks of Japan
