= Manabu Mabe =

Japanese-Brazilian painter

- マナブ間部
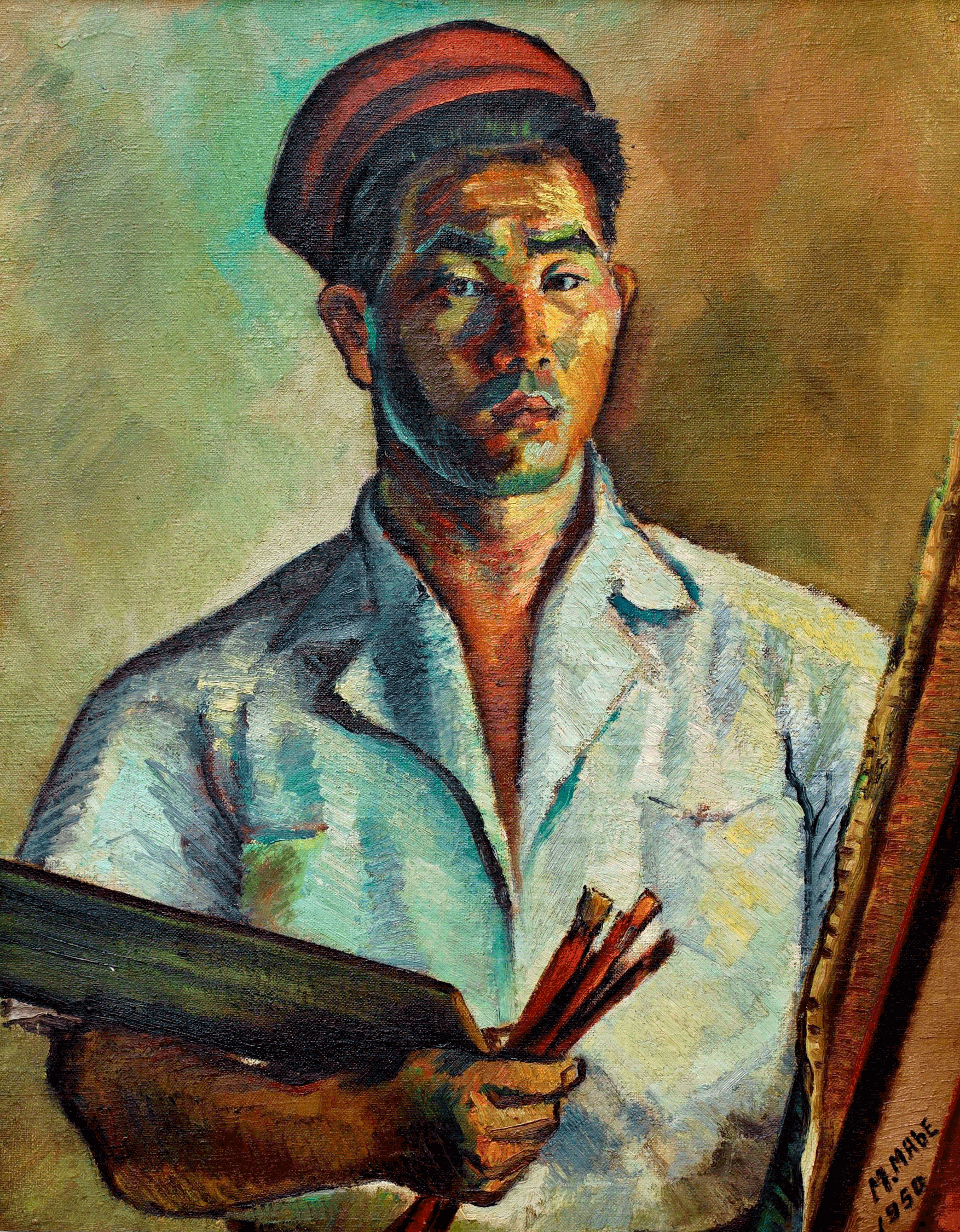
- In a 1950 self-portrait.
- Born: September 14, 1924; Kumamoto, Japan
- Died: September 22, 1997 (aged 73); São Paulo, Brazil
- Known for: Painting, drawing, tapestry
- Movement: Abstract art

Manabu Mabe (マナブ間部) (September 14, 1924 – September 22, 1997) was a Japanese-Brazilian painter. Mabe worked as a vendor of hand-painted ties in São Paulo before becoming an artist.

In the late 1950s, Mabe won the top award in São Paulo's Contemporary Art Salon, the top award as Brazil's best painter in the São Paulo Bienal, and the top honors for artists under 35 at Paris's first biennial.

His works are currently displayed in the permanent exhibitions of the São Paulo Contemporary Art Museum, the Modern Art Museum in Rio de Janeiro, the Boston Contemporary Art Museum, the Beaux-Arts Museum of Dallas among others. The Rio de Janeiro National Museum for the Beaux-Arts lodges the most expressive paintings of a Still Life (oil on canvas). Other institutions that display his work are the National Art Museum of Bolivia and the V+R Sapoznik Art Collection.

Mabe died in São Paulo on September 22, 1997.

== Early life ==
Mabe was born into a formerly prosperous family in Japan, where his father owned a ferryboat business and a hotel called the House of Flowers. When Mabe was seven years old, his father experienced financial ruin. "A Japanese father never explains business affairs to the family," Mabe recalled in a 1959 interview, "but I knew something terrible had happened. My father was bankrupt and humiliated."

The family's circumstances led them to emigrate to Brazil in 1934, enduring a 50-day journey in steerage. His father became a contract laborer on a São Paulo coffee plantation. Young Manabu worked in the plantation fields, tending to rice and vegetables between coffee trees, and eventually became strong enough to carry 88-pound coffee sacks. Despite the demanding physical labor, he taught himself Portuguese by kerosene lamp at night and collected paper scraps for drawing.

== Personal life ==
Mabe married Yoshino in 1951 and had three children. In 1952, he met Tadashi Kaminagai and became an admirer of Kaminagai's art, later recalling how he would spend hours beside the artist "admiring the marvelous colors he used to paint a macaw on Dr. Honda's veranda." He won the painting prize at the second São Paulo International Biennial (1953), where only two Japanese-Brazilian artists were accepted: Mabe and Tadashi Kaminagai.

Manabu Mabe retrospective exhibition, 1975.

In 1956, he participated in the Japan Art Biennial, and in 1959, he won the award for best national painter at the fifth São Paulo Biennial as well as international recognition at the Paris Biennial.

In the book Life and Art of the Japanese in Brazil, Cecília França Lourenço describes the use of geometry and abstractionism by Japanese-Brazilian artists as responding to a "vital and cultural impulse, more easily identified with gesture, form, and formal research, thus becoming an inexhaustible source revitalized through experience." Artists like Mabe and Tikashi Fukushima made decisive contributions to the development of this abstract tendency. When commenting on Tomie Ohtake's work upon reaching artistic maturity, Cecília França Lourenço draws comparisons with the works of Fukushima and Mabe, noting that all three shared "a certain restraint, without allowing the emotion of the work to completely overflow."

== Career and Legacy ==
In 1986, Mabe held a major retrospective exhibition at the São Paulo Museum of Art (MASP) and published a catalogue featuring 156 reproductions of his work with text in Portuguese, English, and Japanese.

The influence of Mabe's work, along with that of fellow Japanese-Brazilian artists like Tomie Ohtake and Tikashi Fukushima, was significant in Brazilian art. A July 1988 article in Veja magazine noted that "the importance given to the work of Mabe, Fukushima, and Shiró attracted a new wave of Japanese artists to Brazil, who arrived in the country as mature artists with established aesthetic positions." By 1989, Japanese-Brazilian artists had become prominent figures in Brazil's informal abstractionism movement.

In 1995, Mabe published his autobiography Chove no Cafezal (It Rains in the Coffee Plantation) in Japanese, which was initially serialized in the Nihon Keizai Shimbun newspaper in his native Kumamoto region. The following year, he traveled to Japan for a major retrospective exhibition of his work.

His works are held in numerous prestigious institutions, including the Museum of Contemporary Art, São Paulo, the Museum of Modern Art, Rio de Janeiro, the Museum of Contemporary Art, Boston, and the Dallas Museum of Fine Arts. The National Museum of Fine Arts in Rio de Janeiro houses one of his most significant paintings, "Still Life" (oil on canvas). His works are also part of the collection at the National Art Museum of Bolivia and the V+R Sapoznik art collection.

=== Varig Flight 967 ===
On 30 January 1979, after an exhibition in Tokyo, 53 of his paintings were on board a Varig 707-323C aircraft en route from Tokyo-Narita to Rio de Janeiro/Galeão via Los Angeles. The aircraft and accompanying paintings went missing over the Pacific Ocean about 30 minutes (200 km ENE) from Tokyo, the cause unknown and wreck undiscovered.

== See also ==
- Japanese Brazilians
- Tadashi Kaminagai
