= José Geraldo Vieira =

Brazilian writer, translator, and literary critic (1897–1977)

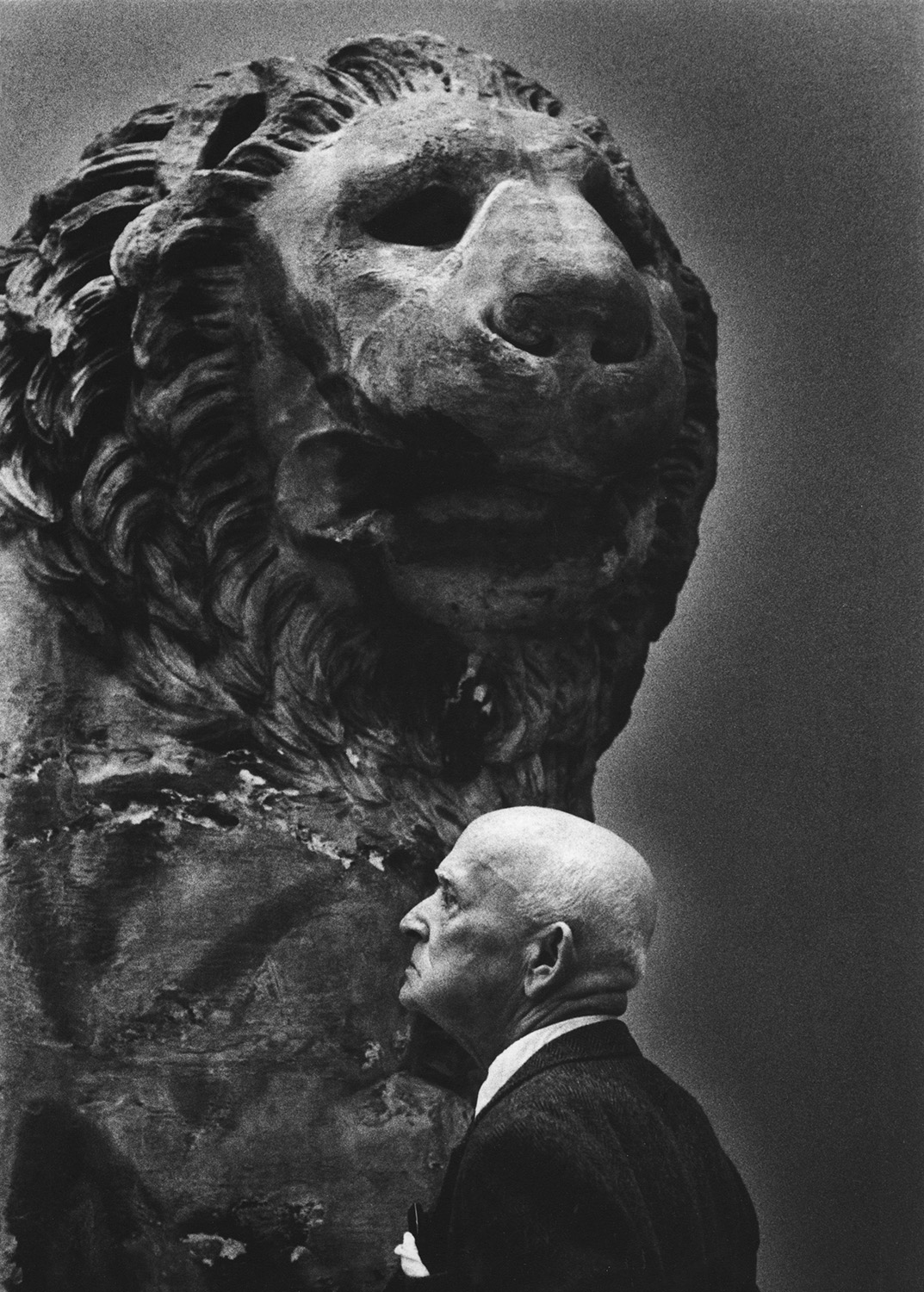
José Geraldo Vieira at the British Museum, in London.

José Geraldo Vieira (April 16, 1897 – August 17, 1977) was a Brazilian poet, novelist, translator, and literary critic.

== Translator ==
As a translator, Vieira was James Joyce's first translator in Brazil, and was also one of the first Brazilian writers to be strongly influenced by Joyce.

He translated 60 books between 1944 and 1971. Among them the authors: Albert Schweitzer, Alphonse Daudet, Bertrand Russell, Dostoievski, Emil Ludwig, Erskine Caldwell, François Mauriac, Hemingway, Mark Twain, Mika Waltari, Níkos Kazantzákis, Pirandello, Stendhal, Thomas Merton and Tolstoy.

== Writer ==
As a writer, José Geraldo Vieira is noted for his strong, image-laden evocations of setting, as well as his explorations of human emotional conflict in the context of religious and moral questions. Acclaimed novels such as “The Slope of Memory”, “The Woman Who Escaped from Sodom”, “The Albatross” and “The Fortieth Door” have primarily urban settings - Rio de Janeiro, São Paulo, Paris - although they also include vivid evocations of pastoral landscapes such as, in the case of “The Fortieth Door”, rural Portugal. Vieira also uses the tumultuous events of the twentieth century, such as the first and second World Wars and the Russian Revolution, to universalize the experiences of his characters. With the exception of a Spanish-language version of “The Woman Who Escaped from Sodom”, Vieira’s works were not translated during his lifetime, a point of irony given his renown as a translator of English and French-language works into Portuguese. In 2023, The Slope of Memory (A Ladeira da Memória) became the first of Vieira's works to be translated into English. The translation was completed by the author's grandson, Roberto Geraldo van Eyken, and published by Kirion Press.

== Works ==
In Portuguese.

- O Triste Epigrama (1919)
- A Ronda do Deslumbramento (1922)
- A Mulher que Fugiu de Sodoma (1931)
- Território Humano (1936)
- A Quadragésima Porta (1944)
- A Túnica e os Dados (1947)
- Carta à Minha Filha em Prantos (1946)
- A Ladeira da Memória (1949)
- O Albatroz (1951)
- Terreno Baldio (1961)
- Paralelo 16: Brasília (1967)
- A Mais que Branca (1973)
- Mansarda Acesa (1975)
- Crítica de Arte na Revista Habitat (posthumous, 2012)
- Impressões e expressões (posthumous, 2016)
