= Shinchi Station =

Railway station in Shinchi, Fukushima Prefecture, Japan

Shinchi Station 新地駅
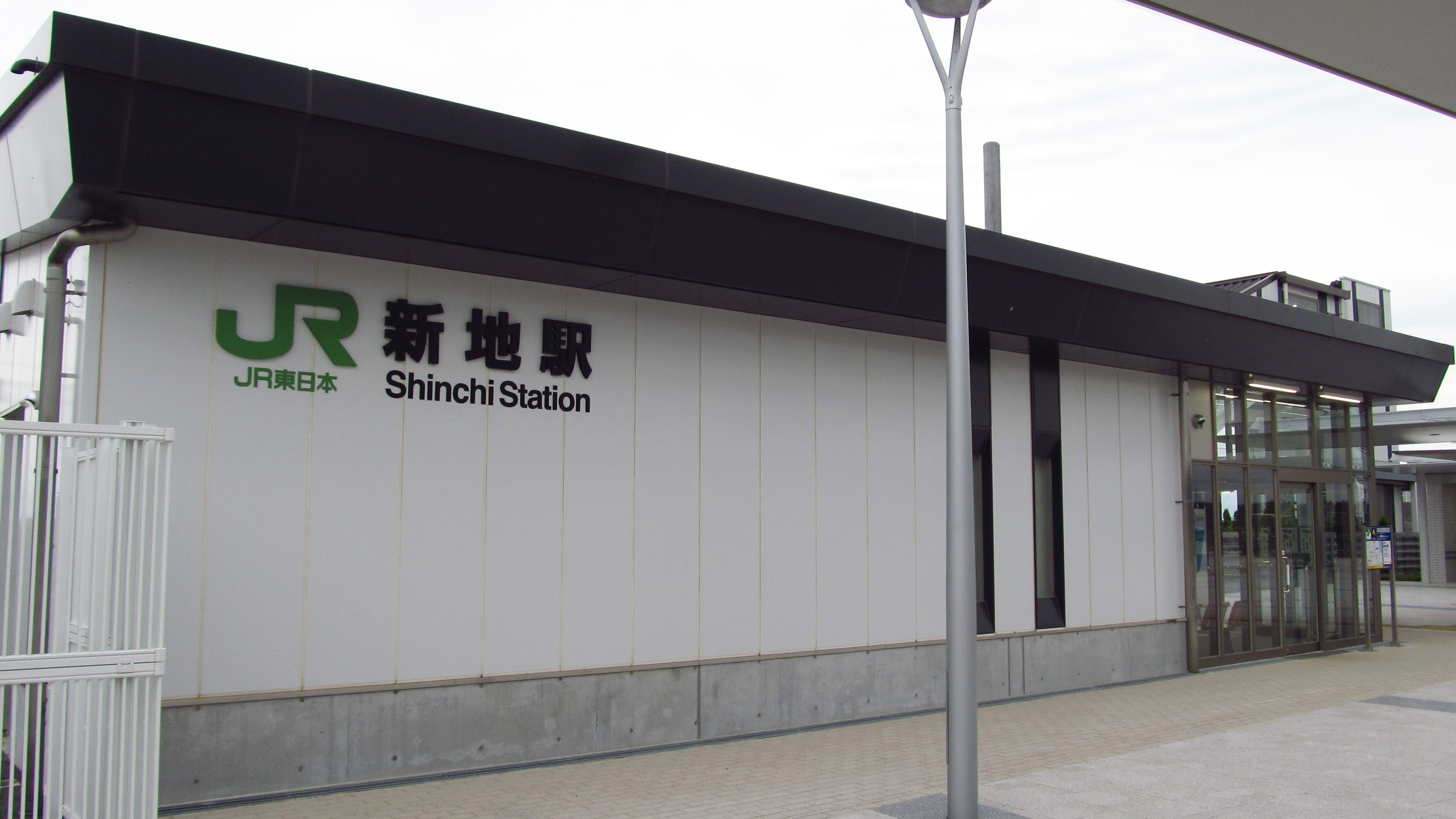
- The station entrance after reopening in October 2017

General information
- Location: Yachigoya, Shinchi-machi, Sōma-gun, Fukushima-ken 979-2702; Japan
- Coordinates: 37°52′45.2″N 140°55′32.4″E
- Operator: JR East
- Line: ■ Jōban Line
- Distance: 315.8 km from Nippori
- Platforms: 2 side platforms
- Tracks: 2

Other information
- Status: Staffed
- Website: Official website

History
- Opened: 10 November 1897
- Rebuilt: 2016

Passengers
- FY2018: 281 daily

Services
Preceding station	JR East	Following station
Komagamine towards Shinagawa	Jōban Line Local-Futsuu	Sakamoto towards Sendai
Location
- Location within Fukushima Prefecture Location within Japan

Shinchi Station (新地駅, Shinchi-eki) is a railway station in the town of Shinchi, Fukushima Prefecture, Japan, operated by East Japan Railway Company (JR East). Operation of the station was suspended due to severe damage to the railway and station facilities caused by the 2011 Tōhoku earthquake and tsunami in March 2011. The station reopened at a new location in December 2016.

== Lines ==
Shinchi Station is served by the Jōban Line and is 315.8 kilometers from the starting point of the line at Nippori in Tokyo. The station is attended.

== Station layout ==
Prior to the 2011 Tōhoku earthquake and tsunami, Shinchi Station previously had a single island platform and a single side platform connected to the station building by a footbridge. The station was rebuilt with two opposed side platforms.

=== Platforms ===
1	■ Jōban Line	for Iwanuma and Sendai
2	■ Jōban Line	for Sōma and Haranomachi

== History ==
Shinchi Station opened on November 10, 1897. The station was absorbed into the JR East network upon the privatization of the Japanese National Railways (JNR) on April 1, 1987.

The station was totally destroyed by the 2011 Tōhoku earthquake and tsunami on 11 March 2011. It reopened at a new location further inland on 10 December 2016.

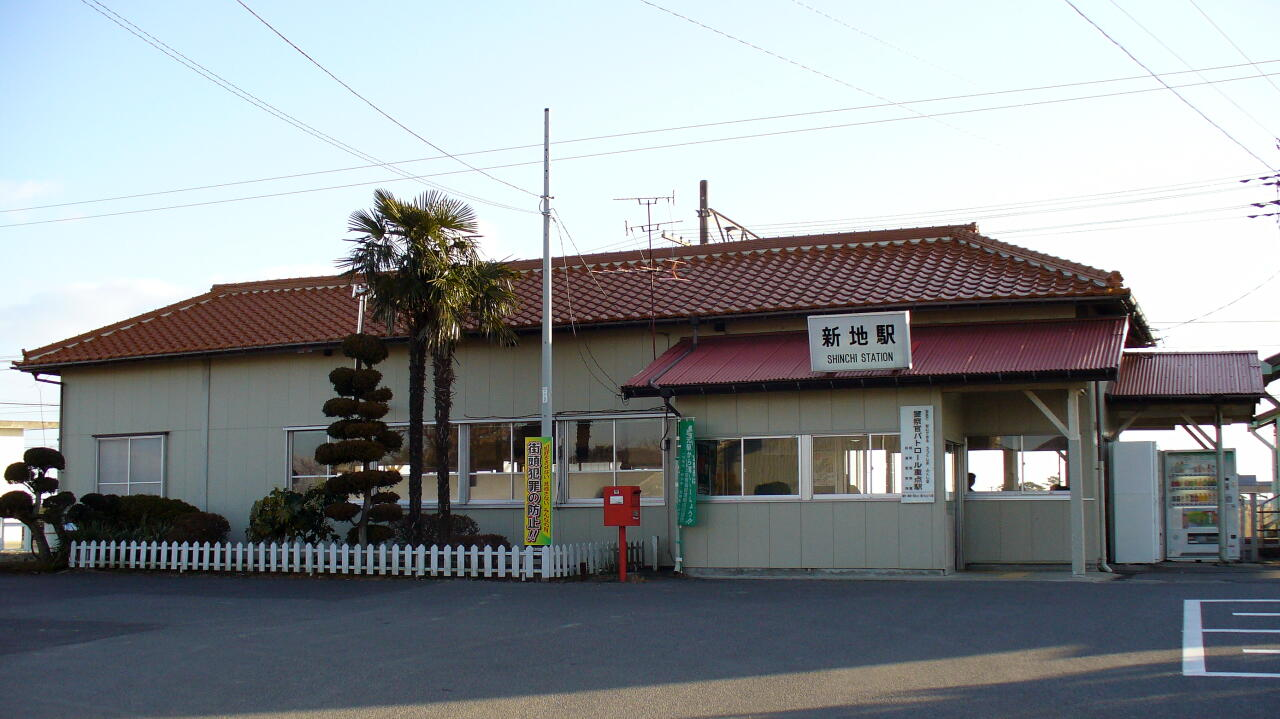
The station building in January 2008

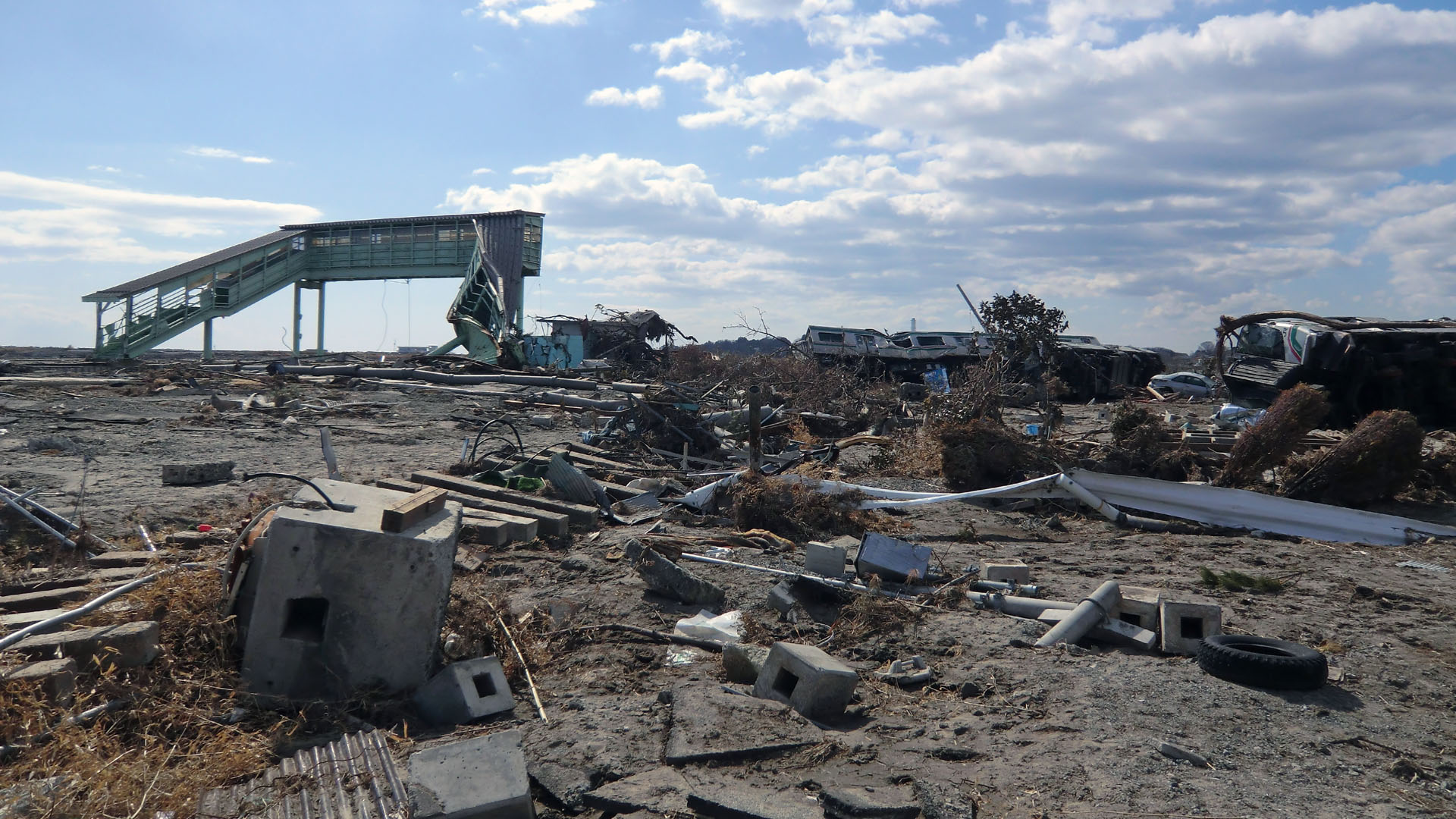
The remains of Shinchi Station, including an E721 series train, after the tsunami in 2011

== Passenger statistics ==
In 2018, the station was used by an average of 281 passengers daily (boarding passengers only).

== Surrounding area ==
- National Route 6
- Shinchi town hall
- Shinchi post office
- Tsurushi fishing port

== See also ==
- List of railway stations in Japan
