= Shinchi Thermal Power Station =

Thermal power station in Sōma, Fukushima, Japan

Shinchi Thermal Power Station 新地発電所
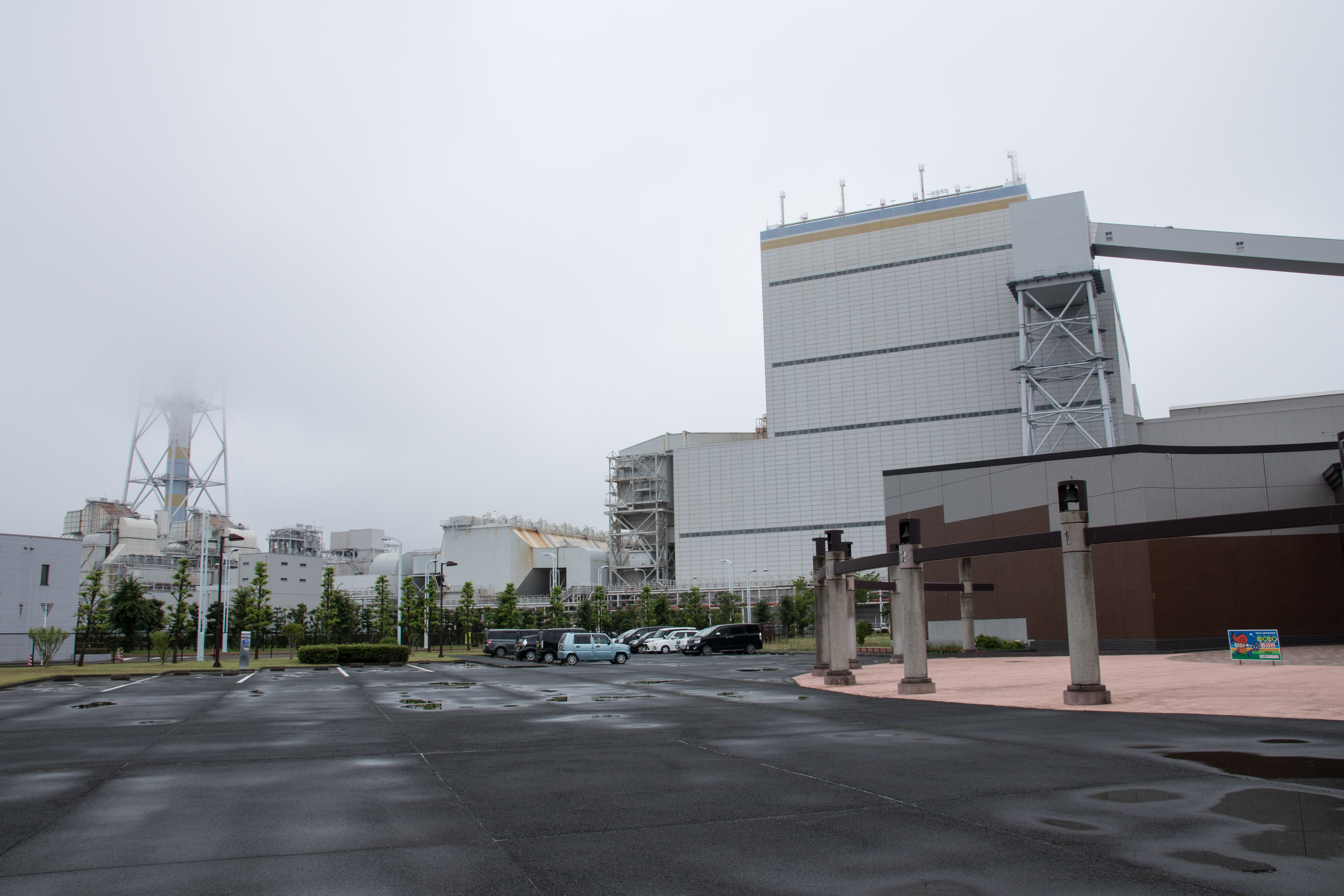
- Shinchi Thermal Power Station
- Country: Japan
- Location: Sōma, Fukushima
- Coordinates: 37°50′35″N 140°56′44″E
- Status: Operational
- Commission date: 1994
- Owners: Sōma Kyōdō Power Co., Ltd
- Operator: Soma Kyodo Power Company

Thermal power station
- Primary fuel: Coal

Power generation
- Units operational: 2
- Nameplate capacity: 2000 MW

The Shinchi Thermal Power Station (新地発電所, Shinchi Karyoku Hatsudensho) is a coal-fired thermal power station operated by the Sōma Kyōdō Power Co., Ltd. in the city of Sōma, Fukushima, Japan. The facility is located on the Pacific coast of Honshu. The Sōma Kyōdō Power Co., Ltd is a 50-50 joint venture between Tohoku Electric and JERA.

== History ==
Unit 1 of the Shinchi Thermal Power Station started operations in July 1994, followed by Unit 2 in July 1995. Each unit uses a super critical steam turbine with a rated output of 1000 MW, with imported coal as the primary fuel source, and with heavy oil and light oil usable as auxiliary sources of fuel. Biomass (wood pellets) were introduced from March 2015 to address the environmental issue of carbon emissions. The main smoke stack of the plant has a height of 200 meters, and can be seen from as far away as the city of Sendai in clear weather.

Operations were temporarily suspended due to damage caused by the Tōhoku earthquake and tsunami in March 2011, but test operations were resumed in December 2011.

The area surrounding the power plant is being developed as an industrial park.

== Plant details ==
Unit	Type	Fuel	Capacity	On-line	Current Status
1	Super-critical Steam Turbine	Coal / Biomass	1000 MW	July 1994	operational
2	Super-critical Steam Turbine	Coal / Biomass	1000 MW	July 1995	operational

== See also ==
- Energy in Japan
- List of power stations in Japan
