= Flavio-Shiró =

Japanese painter

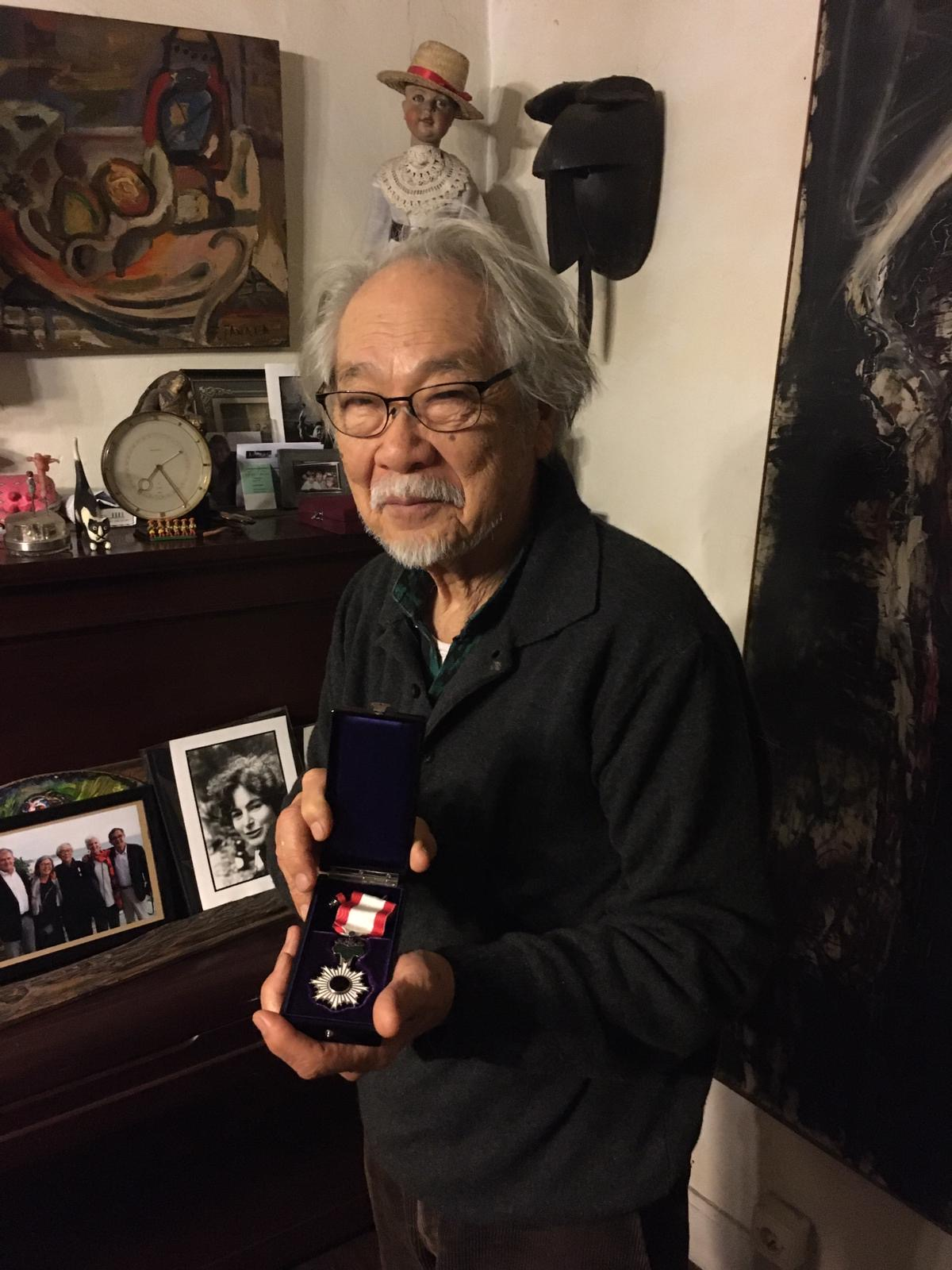
- Flavio-Shiró in 2019, when he was awarded the Order of the Rising Sun.
- Born: August 27, 1928 (age 98); Sapporo, Japan
- Education: Ecole nationale superieure des beaux arts
- Known for: Painting, drawing, printing
- Style: abstract expressionism
- Movement: Abstract art

Flavio-Shiró (born August 27, 1928) is a Japanese-Brazilian visual artist. Regarded as an influential postwar Brazilian painter, he is known for his dark and disturbing paintings that merge elements of abstract expressionism and surrealism. He is one of the main representatives of abstract expressionism in Brazil.

Born in Hokkaido, Japan and raised in the Amazon, Flavio-Shiró spent his adult life working in Paris and Rio de Janeiro. His work has been exhibited in many countries, including Brazil, France, Germany, Italy, Japan, the Netherlands, the United Kingdom, and the United States. His paintings are also included in the permanent collections of notable museums including the Hara Museum of Contemporary Art, the São Paulo Museum of Modern Art, and the Fonds national d'art contemporain. In 2019, Flavio-Shiró received the Order of the Rising Sun from the Emperor of Japan, the highest award conferred by the Japanese government to non-politicians, in recognition of his cultural contributions.

== Biography ==
Flavio-Shiró was born in 1928 in Sapporo, on the northern Japanese island of Hokkaido. In 1932, he emigrated to Tomé-Açu, Brazil with his family as part of a settler agricultural mission. Flavio-Shiró’s formative years were spent in the Amazon jungle, an experience that had a lasting influence on his artistic style and worldview. In 1939, he moved with his family to São Paulo, Brazil in search of a better education and economic opportunity.

In São Paulo, Flavio-Shiró began his artistic training, studying at an arts and crafts school and painting movie posters for Metro-Goldwyn-Mayer. He also began to participate in group shows, joining the São Paulo Artists’ Union and the Grupo Santa Helena, a movement of working-class modern painters. In the early 1950s, Flavio-Shiró held his first solo exhibition in Rio de Janeiro and exhibited paintings in the first São Paulo Art Biennial, the second oldest art biennial in the world.

In 1953, Flavio-Shiró emigrated to Paris where he studied engraving and lithography at the Ecole nationale superieure des beaux arts and married the Romanian-Brazilian author and illustrator Beatrice Tanaka. In the 1960s, Flavio-Shiró’s work shifted from abstract expressionism towards an increasingly surrealistic style featuring organic shapes and nightmarish objects inspired by his childhood in the Amazon. His artistic contributions during this period were recognized with several prestigious exhibits and awards, including the Guggenheim International Show in 1963 and the prize for painting at the second Biennale de Paris in 1961.

From the 1970s through the 2010s, Flavio-Shiró’s artistic production has continued. His signature style, combining abstract gestures, rich colors, and disturbing biological objects, continued to evolve, with landmark, large-scale works including Pablo (1973) and Memória dos Cais (1987), which is in the permanent collection of the São Paulo Museum of Modern Art. He received numerous awards, including the Itamaraty Award at the 1989 São Paulo Biennial and the Eco-Art Prize at the 1992 Earth Summit in Rio de Janeiro, and held solo exhibitions at the Hara Museum of Contemporary Art, the Niterói Contemporary Art Museum, and the Tomie Ohtake Institute.

In August 2019, in recognition of his cultural achievements, the Japanese government awarded Flavio-Shiró the Order of the Rising Sun, the highest award offered by the Japanese government to non-politicians.

== Solo exhibitions ==
Date	Place
1993	Museum of Modern Art, Rio de Janeiro
1993	Hara Museum of Contemporary Art, Tokyo
1993	Museu de Arte Moderna (MAM), São Paulo
1994	Niterói Contemporary Art Museum, Niterói
1998	Casa das 11 Janelas, Belem
2008	Centro Cultural Correios, Rio de Janeiro
2008	Instituto Tomie Ohtake, São Paulo
2018	Cultural Pinakotheke, São Paulo
2018	Cultural Pinakotheke, Rio de Janeiro
