= Abukuma =

Abukuma may refer to:

- Places in Japan:
  - Abukuma River
  - Abukuma Highlands
  - Abukuma-do, limestone caves in Fukushima, Japan
  - Abukuma Express Line, a railroad line
  - Abukuma Station
- Japanese cruiser Abukuma, a World War II cruiser of the Imperial Japanese Navy
