= Kakuda Station =

Railway station in Kakuda, Miyagi Prefecture, Japan

Kakuda Station 角田駅
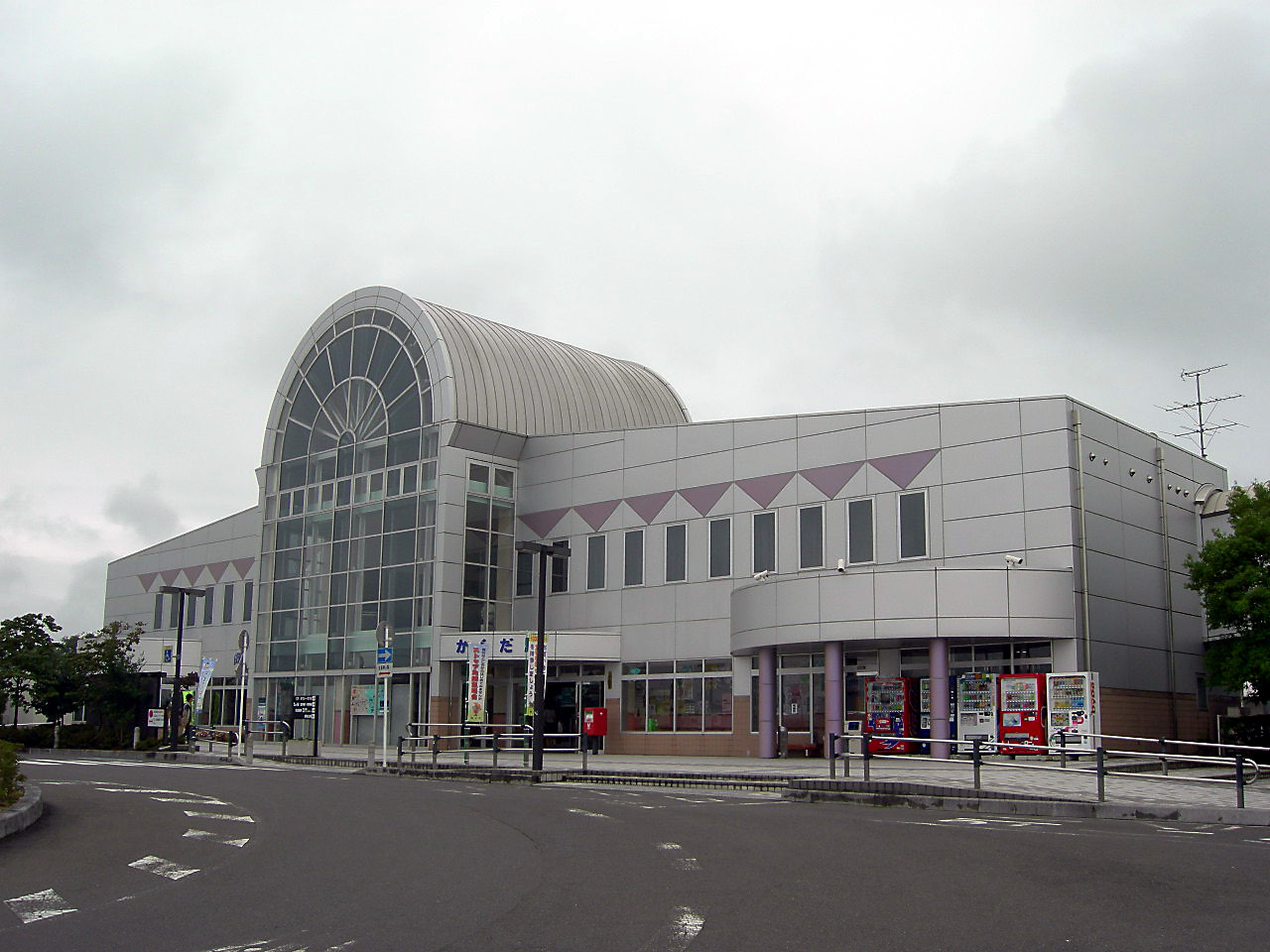
- Kakuda Station in August 2008

General information
- Location: Kakuda, Kakuda-shi, Miyagi-ken 981-1505; Japan
- Coordinates: 37°58′45.39″N 140°46′21.54″E
- Operator: Abukuma Express
- Line: ■ Abukuma Express Line
- Distance: 43.3 km from Fukushima
- Platforms: 2 side platforms
- Tracks: 2

Other information
- Status: Staffed
- Website: Official website

History
- Opened: April 1, 1968
Location
- Location within Japan

Kakuda Station (角田駅, Kakuda-eki) is a railway station on the Abukuma Express Line in the city of Kakuda, Miyagi, Japan.

== Lines ==
Kakuda Station is served by the Abukuma Express Line, and is located 43.3 km from the official starting point of the line at Fukushima.

== Station layout ==
Kakuda Station has a two opposed side platforms connected to the station building by a footbridge. The station is staffed.

=== Platforms ===
1	■ Abukuma Express Line	for Tsukinoki, Sendai for Marumori, Yanagawa, and Fukushima
2	■ Abukuma Express Line	for Marumori, Yanagawa, and Fukushima (peak hours only)

== Adjacent stations ==
«	Service	»
Abukuma Express Line
Rapid: Does not stop at this station
Minami-Kakuda	Local	Yokokura

== History ==
Kakuda Station opened on April 1, 1968, as a station operated by Japanese National Railways (JNR). It became part of the Abukuma Express network on July 1, 1986, and a second platform was added.

== Surrounding area ==
- National Route 113
- Kakuda City Hall
- Kakuda Post Office

== See also ==
- List of railway stations in Japan
