= Mukaisenoue Station =

Railway station in Fukushima, Fukushima Prefecture, Japan

Mukaisenoue Station 向瀬上駅
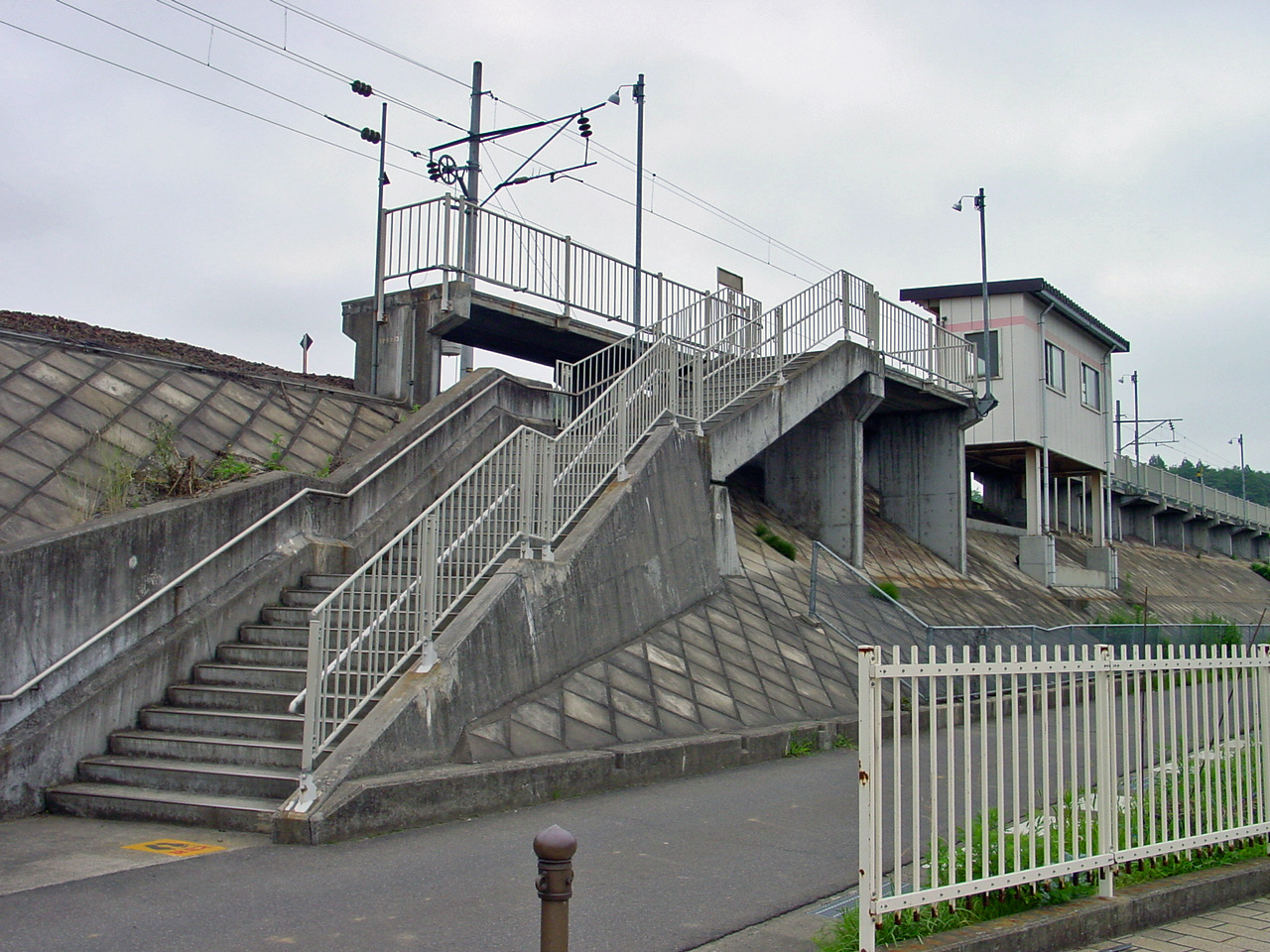
- Mukaisenoue Station, July 2003

General information
- Location: Minamiiwakawara Senouemachi, Fukushima-shi, Fukushima-ken 960-0101; Japan
- Coordinates: 37°48′23.32″N 140°30′36.10″E
- Operator: AbukumaExpress
- Line: ■ Abukuma Express Line
- Distance: 8.6 km from Fukushima
- Platforms: 1 side platform

Other information
- Status: Unstaffed
- Website: http://www.abukyu.co.jp/about/time-table/nobori/post-18.html

History
- Opened: July 1, 1988

Passengers
- FY2015: 27 (daily)
Location
- Location within Fukushima Prefecture Location within Japan

Mukaisenoue Station (向瀬上駅, Mukaisenoue-eki) is a railway station on the AbukumaExpress in the city of Fukushima, Fukushima Prefecture, Japan.

== Lines ==
Mukaisenoue Station is served by the Abukuma Express Line, and is located 8.6 rail kilometres from the official starting point of the line at Fukushima.

== Station layout ==
Mukaisenoue Station has one side platform serving a single bi-directional track. There is no station building, and the station is unattended.

== Adjacent stations ==
«	Service	»
Abukuma Express Line
Rapid: Does not stop at this station
Senoue	Local	Takako

== History ==
Mukaisenoue Station opened on July 1, 1988.

== Passenger statistics ==
In fiscal 2015, the station was used by an average of 27 passengers daily (boarding passengers only).

== Surrounding area ==
- Abukuma River

== See also ==
- List of railway stations in Japan
