= Kamihobara Station =

Railway station in Date, Fukushima Prefecture, Japan

Kamihobara Station 上保原駅
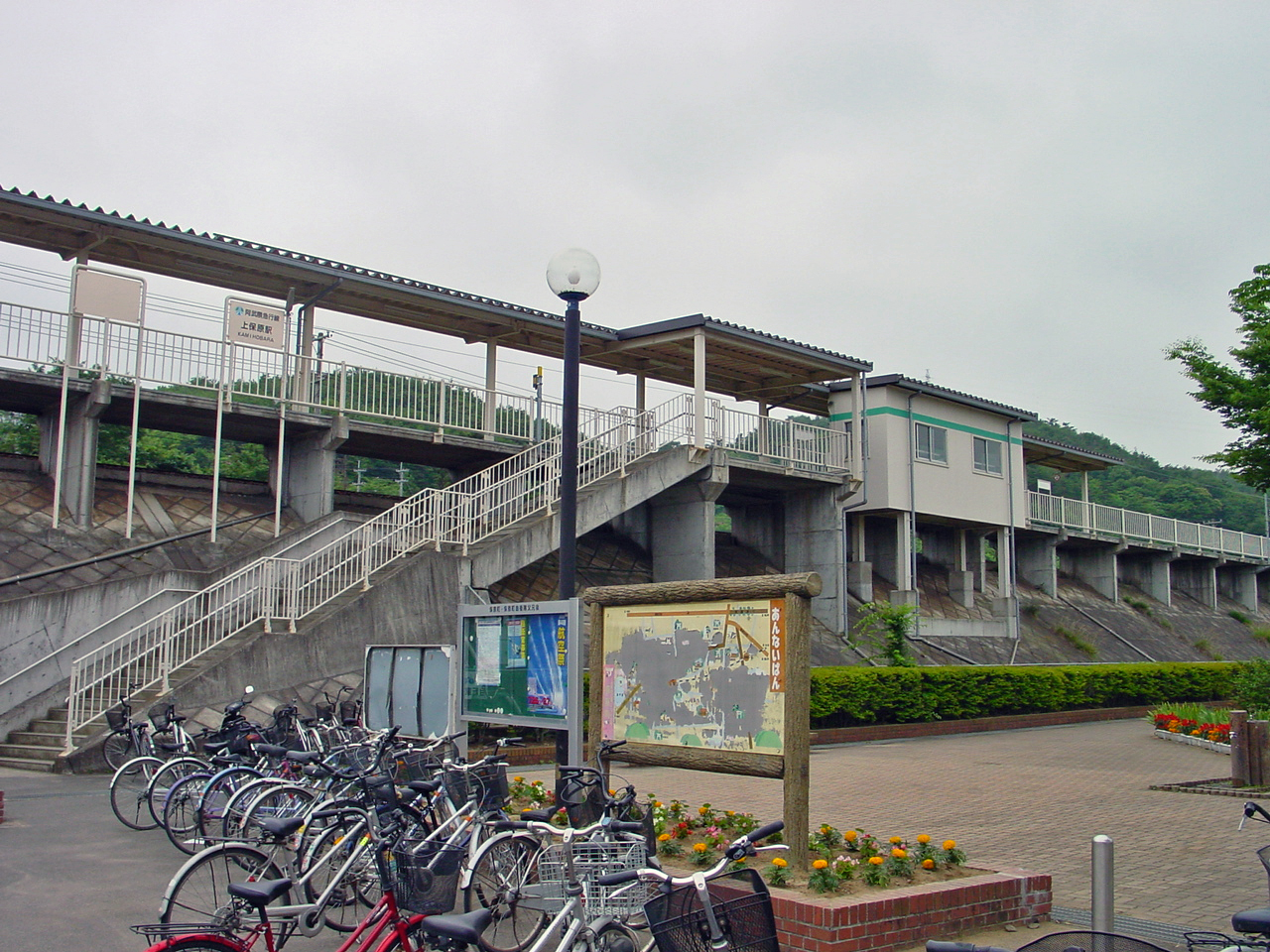
- Kamihobara Station, July 2003

General information
- Location: Shimototsuki Hobaramachi Kamihobara, Date-shi, Fukushima-ken 960-0684; Japan
- Coordinates: 37°48′34.99″N 140°32′35.09″E
- Operator: AbukumaExpress
- Line: ■ Abukuma Express Line
- Distance: 11.5 km from Fukushima
- Platforms: 1 side platform

Other information
- Status: Unstaffed
- Website: http://www.abukyu.co.jp/about/time-table/nobori/post-20.html

History
- Opened: July 1, 1988

Passengers
- FY2015: 227 (daily)
Location
- Location within Fukushima Prefecture Location within Japan

Kamihobara Station (上保原駅, Kamihobara-eki) is a railway station on the AbukumaExpress in the city of Date, Fukushima Japan.

== Lines ==
Kamihobara Station is served by the Abukuma Express Line, and is located 11.5 rail kilometres from the official starting point of the line at Fukushima.

== Station layout ==
Kamihobara Station has one side platform serving a single bi-directional track.

== Adjacent stations ==
«	Service	»
Abukuma Express Line
Rapid: Does not stop at this station
Takako	Local	Hobara

== History ==
Kamihobara Station opened on July 1, 1988.

== Passenger statistics ==
In fiscal 2015, the station was used by an average of 227 passengers daily (boarding passengers only).

== Surrounding area ==
The station is located in a rural area surrounded by rice fields.

== See also ==
- List of railway stations in Japan
