= Oroshimachi Station =

Oroshimachi Station may refer to one of the following railway stations in Japan:

- Oroshimachi Station (Fukushima) on the Abukuma Express Line
- Oroshimachi Station (Miyagi) on the Sendai Subway Tozai Line
