= Nitta Station (Fukushima) =

Railway station in Date, Fukushima Prefecture, Japan

Nitta Station 新田駅
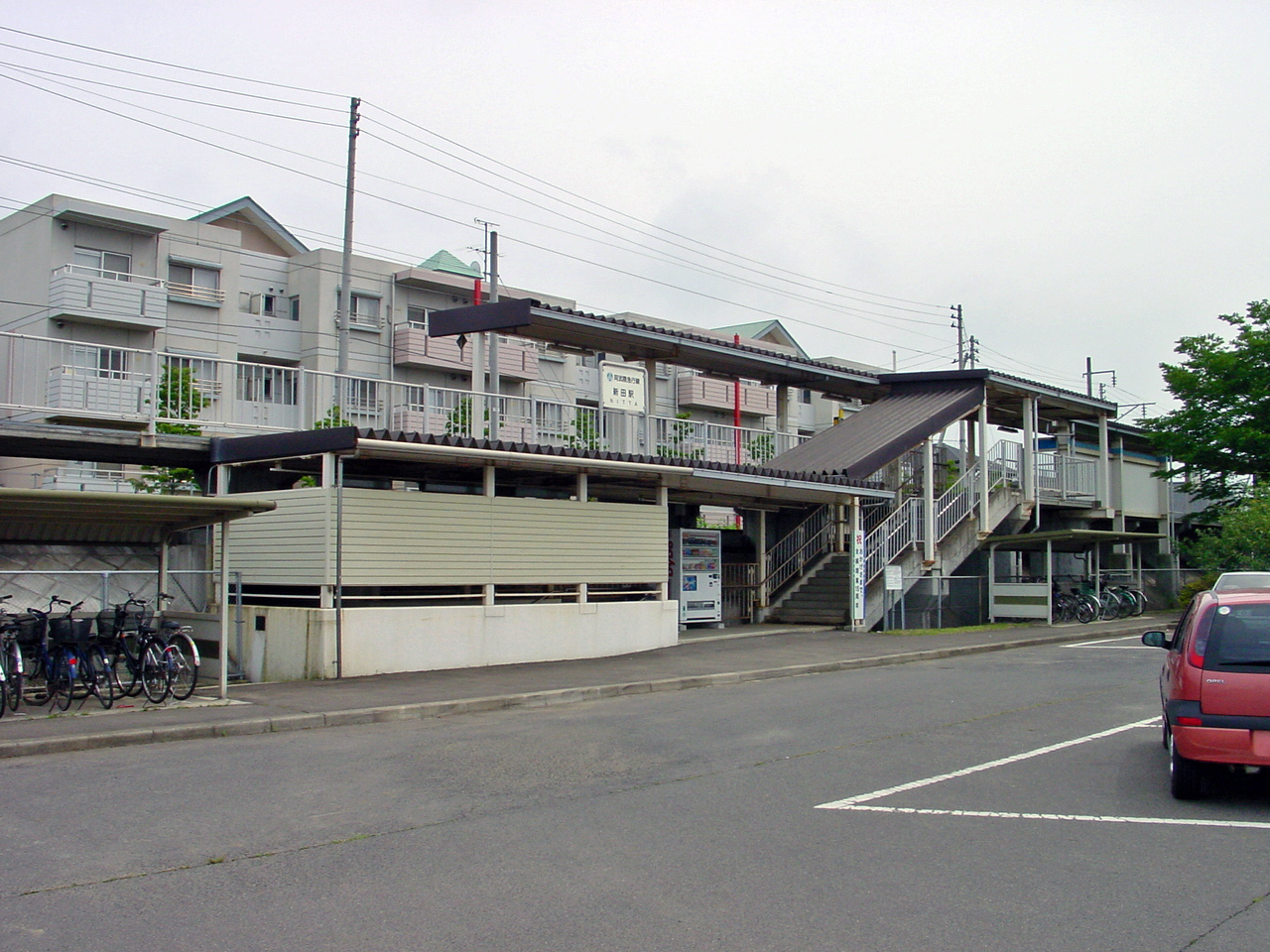
- Nitta Station, July 2003

General information
- Location: Aoba-cho Yōkōdai, Date-shi, Fukushima-ken 960-0760; Japan
- Coordinates: 37°50′16.34″N 140°35′34.91″E
- Operator: AbukumaExpress
- Line: ■ Abukuma Express Line
- Distance: 17.0 km from Fukushima
- Platforms: 1 side platform

Other information
- Status: Unstaffed
- Website: http://www.abukyu.co.jp/about/time-table/nobori/post-24.html

History
- Opened: July 1, 1988

Passengers
- FY2015: 170 (daily)
Location
- Location within Fukushima Prefecture Location within Japan

Nitta Station (新田駅, Nitta-eki) is a railway station on the AbukumaExpress in the city of Date, Fukushima Japan.

== Lines ==
Nitta Station is served by the Abukuma Express Line, and is located 17.0 rail kilometres from the official starting point of the line at Fukushima.

== Station layout ==
Nitta Station has a one side platform a single bi-directional track. The station is unattended.

== Adjacent stations ==
| « | Service | » |
Abukuma Express Line
Rapid: Does not stop at this station
| Niida | Local | Yanagawa |

== History ==
Nitta Station opened on July 1, 1988.

== Passenger statistics ==
In fiscal 2015, the station was used by an average of 150 passengers daily (boarding passengers only).

== Surrounding area ==
The station is located in a suburban residential district of Date.

== See also ==
- List of railway stations in Japan
