= Fukushima Gakuin-mae Station =

Railway station in Fukushima, Fukushima Prefecture, Japan

Fukushima Gakuin-mae Station 福島学院前駅
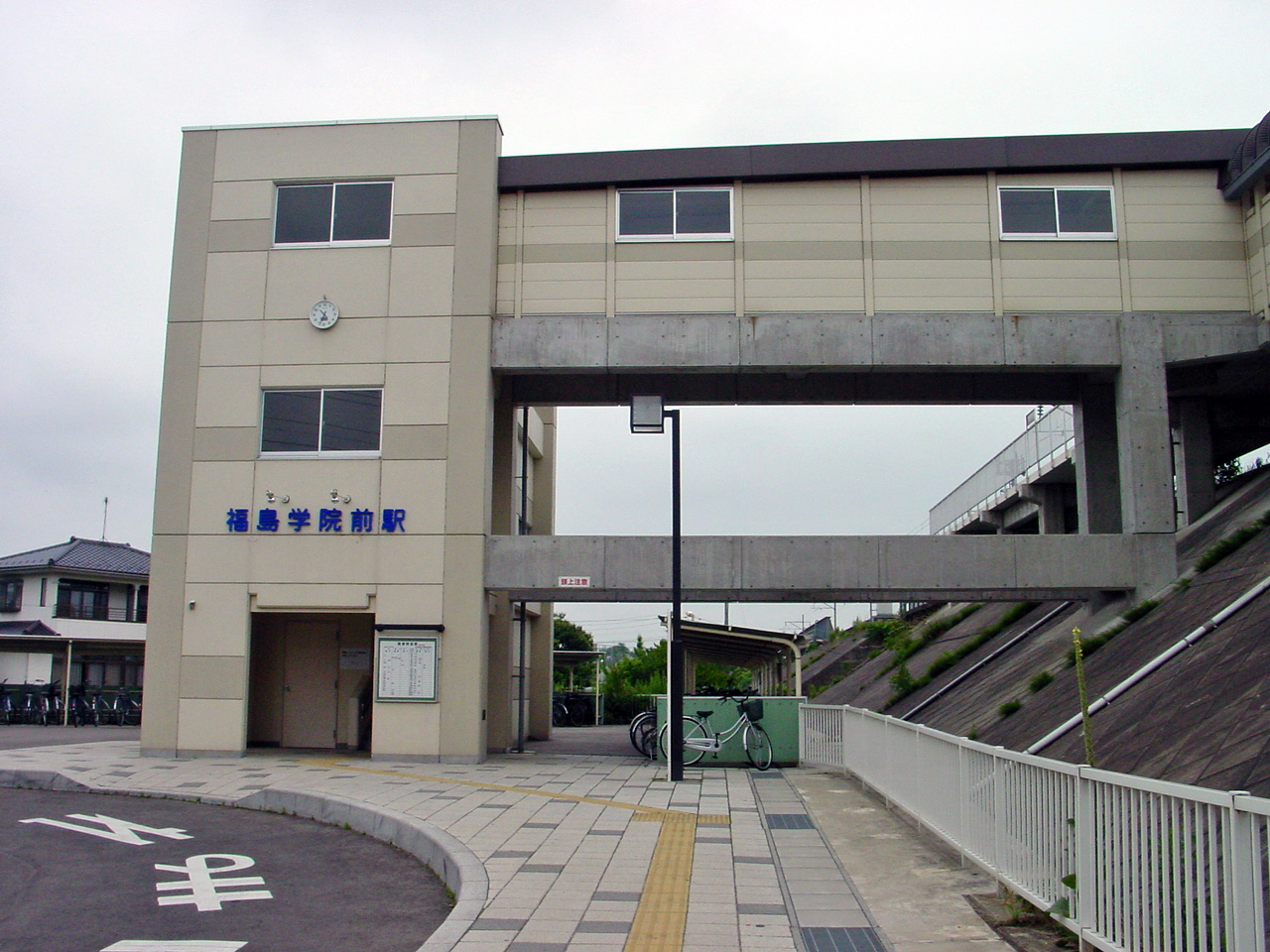
- Fukushima Gakuin-mae Station, July 2003

General information
- Location: Senoue-machi, Fukushima-shi, Fukushima-ken 960-0102; Japan
- Coordinates: 37°47′56.40″N 140°29′20.56″E
- Operator: AbukumaExpress
- Line: ■ Abukuma Express Line
- Distance: 6.5 km from Fukushima
- Platforms: 1 side platforms

Other information
- Status: Unstaffed
- Website: http://www.abukyu.co.jp/about/time-table/nobori/post-16.html

History
- Opened: March 11, 2000

Passengers
- FY2015: 344 (daily)
Location
- Location within Fukushima Prefecture Location within Japan

Fukushima Gakuin-mae Station (福島学院前駅, Fukushima Gakuin-mae-eki) is a railway station on the AbukumaExpress in the city of Fukushima, Fukushima Prefecture, Japan.

== Lines ==
Fukushima Gakuin-mae Station is served by the Abukuma Express Line, and is located 6.5 rail kilometres from the official starting point of the line at Fukushima.

== Station layout ==
Fukushima Gakuin-mae Station has one elevated side platform serving a single bi-directional track. The station is unattended.

== Adjacent stations ==
«	Service	»
Abukuma Express Line
Rapid: Does not stop at this station
Oroshimachi	Local	Senoue

== History ==
Fukushima Gakuin-mae Station opened on March 11, 2000.

== Passenger statistics ==
In fiscal 2015, the station was used by an average of 344 passengers daily (boarding passengers only).

== Surrounding area ==
- Fukushima College
- National Route 4

== See also ==
- List of railway stations in Japan
