= Senoue Station =

Railway station in Fukushima, Fukushima Prefecture, Japan

Senoue Station 瀬上駅
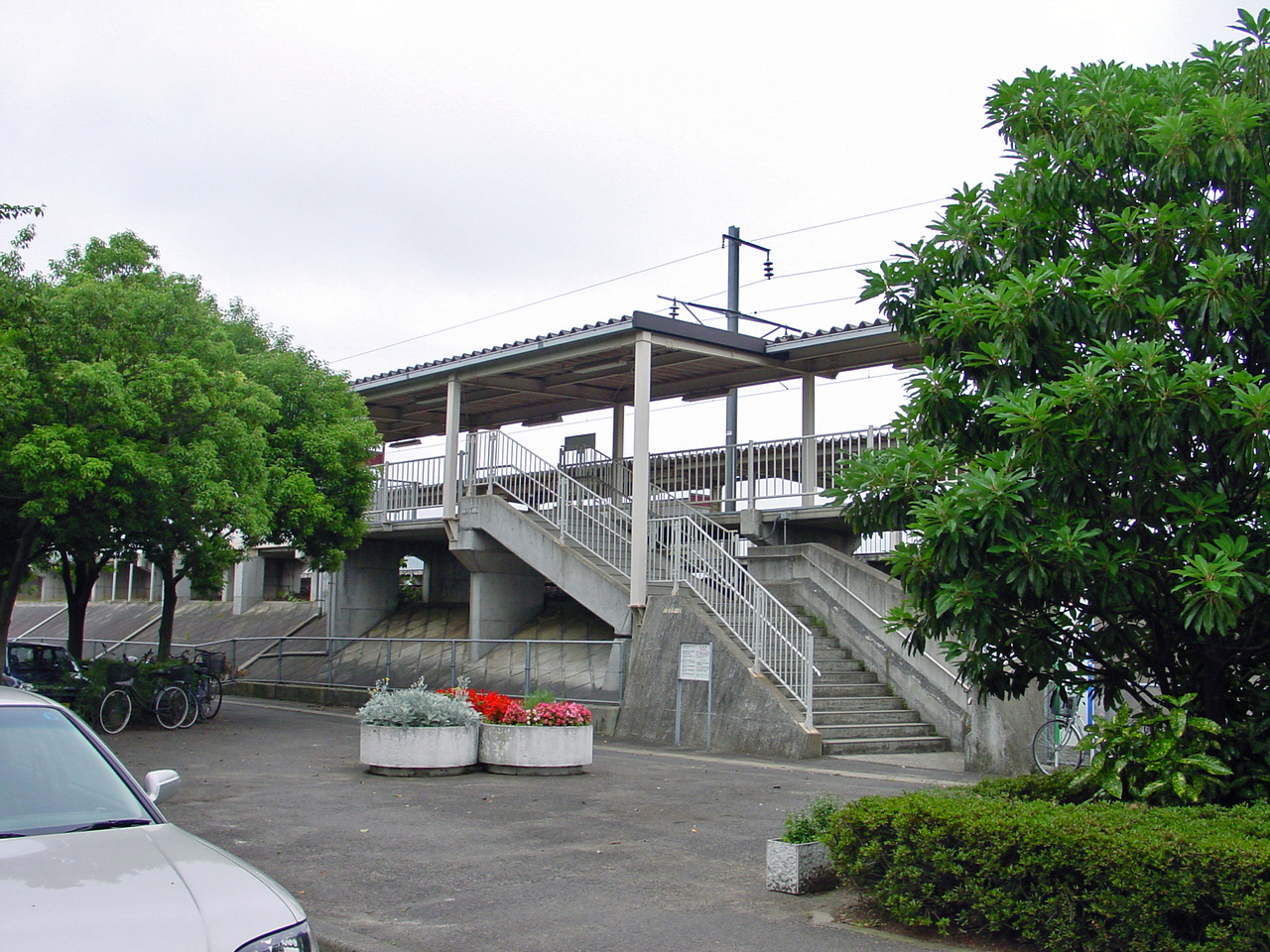
- Senoue Station, July 2003

General information
- Location: Sakuramachi Senouemachi, Fukushima-shi, Fukushima-ken 960-0101; Japan
- Coordinates: 37°48′8.57″N 140°29′54.48″E
- Operator: AbukumaExpress
- Line: ■ Abukuma Express Line
- Distance: 7.5 km from Fukushima
- Platforms: 2 side platforms

Other information
- Status: Unstaffed
- Website: http://www.abukyu.co.jp/about/time-table/nobori/post-18.html

History
- Opened: July 1, 1988

Passengers
- FY2015: 169 (daily)
Location
- Location within Fukushima Prefecture Location within Japan

Senoue Station (瀬上駅, Senoue-eki) is a railway station on the Abukuma Express Line in the city of Fukushima, Fukushima Prefecture, Japan.

== Lines ==
Senoue Station is served by the Abukuma Express Line, and is located 7.5 km from the official starting point of the line at Fukushima.

== Station layout ==
Senoue Station has two opposed side platforms, each with two tracks, connected by an underground passage. There is no station building, and the station is unattended.

== Adjacent stations ==
«	Service	»
Abukuma Express Line
Rapid: Does not stop at this station
Fukushima Gakuin-mae	Local	Mukaisenoue

== History ==
Senoue Station opened on July 1, 1988.

== Passenger statistics ==
In fiscal 2015, the station was used by an average of 169 passengers daily (boarding passengers only).

== Surrounding area ==
- National Route 4

== See also ==
- List of railway stations in Japan
