= Minami-Kakuda Station =

Railway station in Kakuda, Miyagi Prefecture, Japan

Minami-Kakuda Station 南角田駅
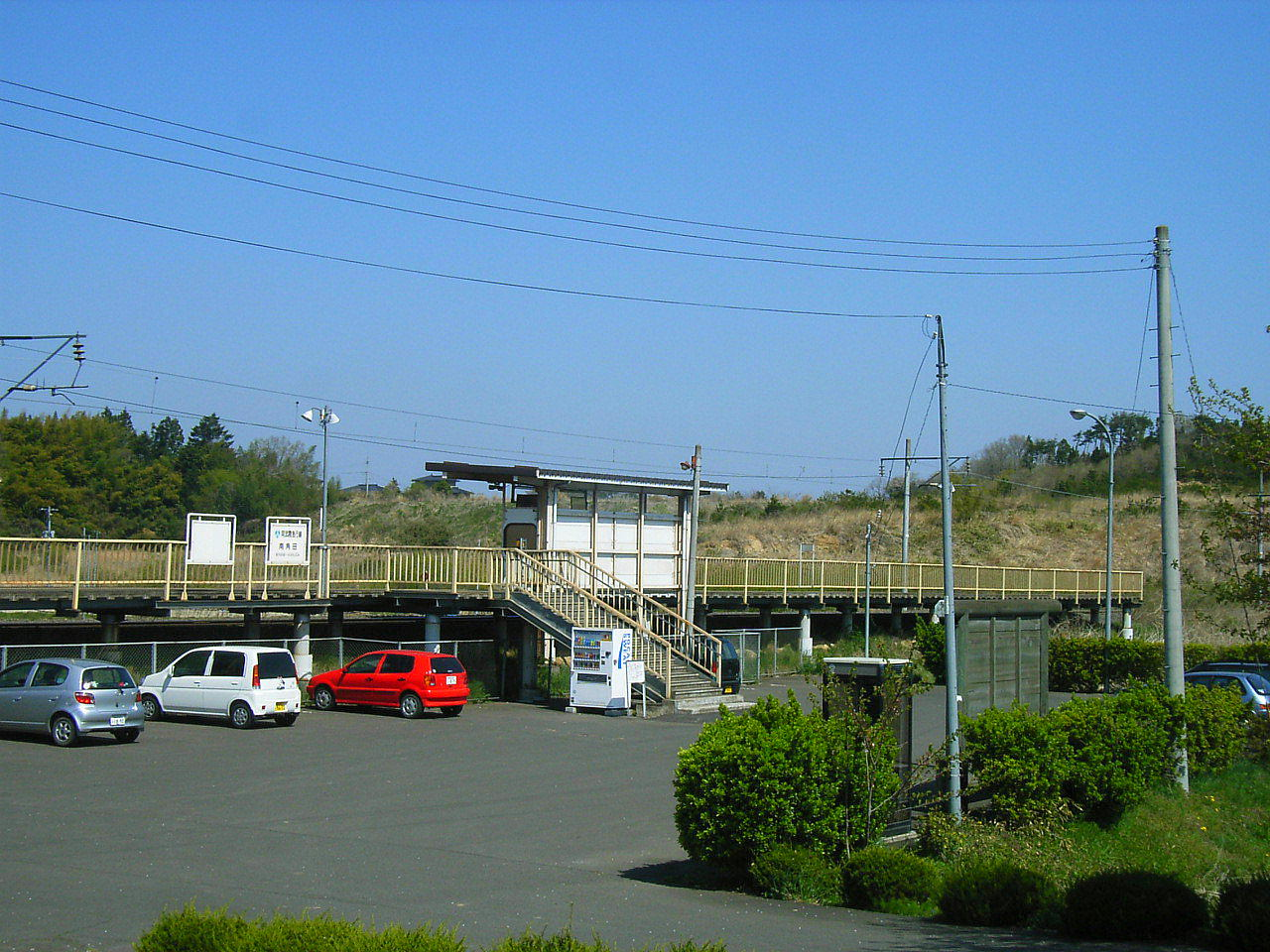
- Minami-Kakuda Station, April 2005

General information
- Location: Suribachi Kakuda, Kakuda-shi, Miyagi-ken 981-1505; Japan
- Coordinates: 37°57′53.47″N 140°46′10.75″E
- Operator: AbukumaExpress
- Line: ■ Abukuma Express Line
- Distance: 41.6 km from Fukushima
- Platforms: 1 side platform
- Tracks: 1

Other information
- Status: Unstaffed
- Website: Official website

History
- Opened: April 1, 1968
Location
- Location within Japan

Minami-Kakuda Station (南角田駅, Minami-Kakuda eki) is a railway station on the AbukumaExpress in the city of Kakuda, Miyagi Prefecture, Japan.

== Lines ==
Minami-Kakuda Station is served by the Abukuma Express Line, and is located 41.6 rail kilometers from the official starting point of the line at Fukushima.

== Station layout ==
Minami-Kakuda Station has one side platform serving a single bi-directional. There is no station building, but only a shelter built on the platform. The station is unattended.

== Adjacent stations ==
«	Service	»
Abukuma Express Line
Rapid: Does not stop at this station
Kita-Marumori	Local	Kakuda

== History ==
Minami-Kakuda Station opened with the start of operations of the Abukuma Express on July 1, 1986.

== Surrounding area ==
The station is located south of Kakuda Station and southwest of Kakuda City Hall. Separated from the city center by a ridge, the station commands a rural view of rice fields.

- site of Kakuda Castle

== See also ==
- List of railway stations in Japan
