= Tomino Station =

Railway station in Date, Fukushima Prefecture, Japan

Tomino Station 富野駅
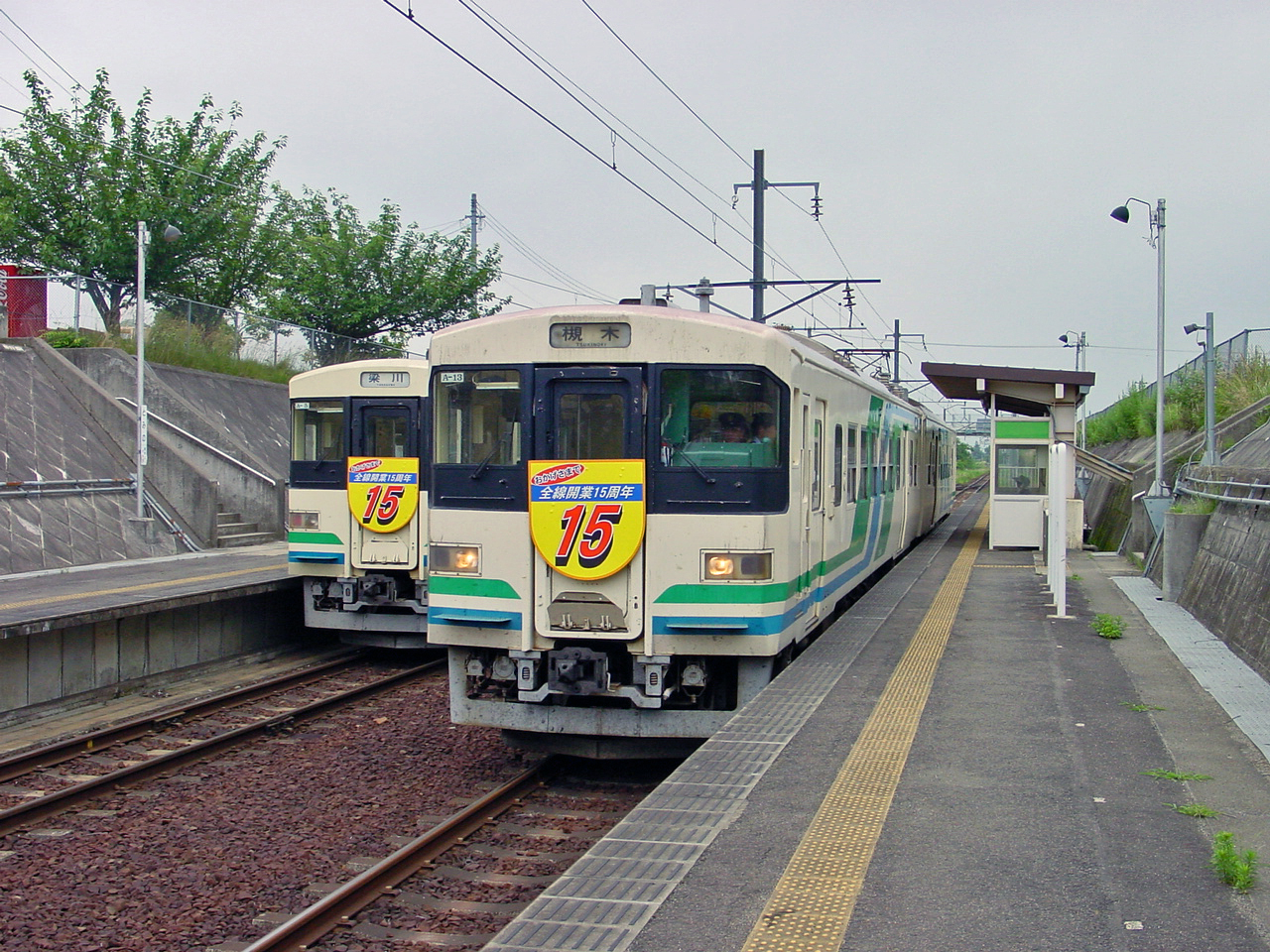
- Tomino Station, July 2003

General information
- Location: Yanagawa-machi, Date-shi, Fukushima-ken 960-0704; Japan
- Coordinates: 37°52′29.2″N 140°37′38.88″E
- Operator: AbukumaExpress
- Line: ■ Abukuma Express Line
- Platforms: 2 side platforms

Other information
- Status: Unstaffed
- Website: http://www.abukyu.co.jp/about/time-table/nobori/post-12.html

History
- Opened: July 1, 1988.

Passengers
- FY2015: 33 (daily)
Location
- Location within Fukushima Prefecture Location within Japan

Tomino Station (富野駅, Tomino-eki) is a railway station on the AbukumaExpress in the city of Date, Fukushima Japan.

== Lines ==
Tomino Station is served by the Abukuma Express Line, and is located 22.1 rail kilometres from the official starting point of the line at Fukushima.

== Station layout ==
Tomino Station has two opposed side platforms connected by a level crossing. There is no station building and the station is unstaffed.

== Adjacent stations ==
«	Service	»
Abukuma Express Line
Rapid: Does not stop at this station
Yanagawa Kibōnomori Kōen-mae	Local	Kabuto

== History ==
Tomino Station opened on July 1, 1988.

== Passenger statistics ==
In fiscal 2015, the station was used by an average of 33 passengers daily (boarding passengers only).

== Surrounding area ==
- Abukuma River
- National Route 349

== See also ==
- List of railway stations in Japan
