= Kita-Marumori Station =

Railway station in Marumori, Miyagi Prefecture, Japan

Kitamarumori Station 北丸森駅
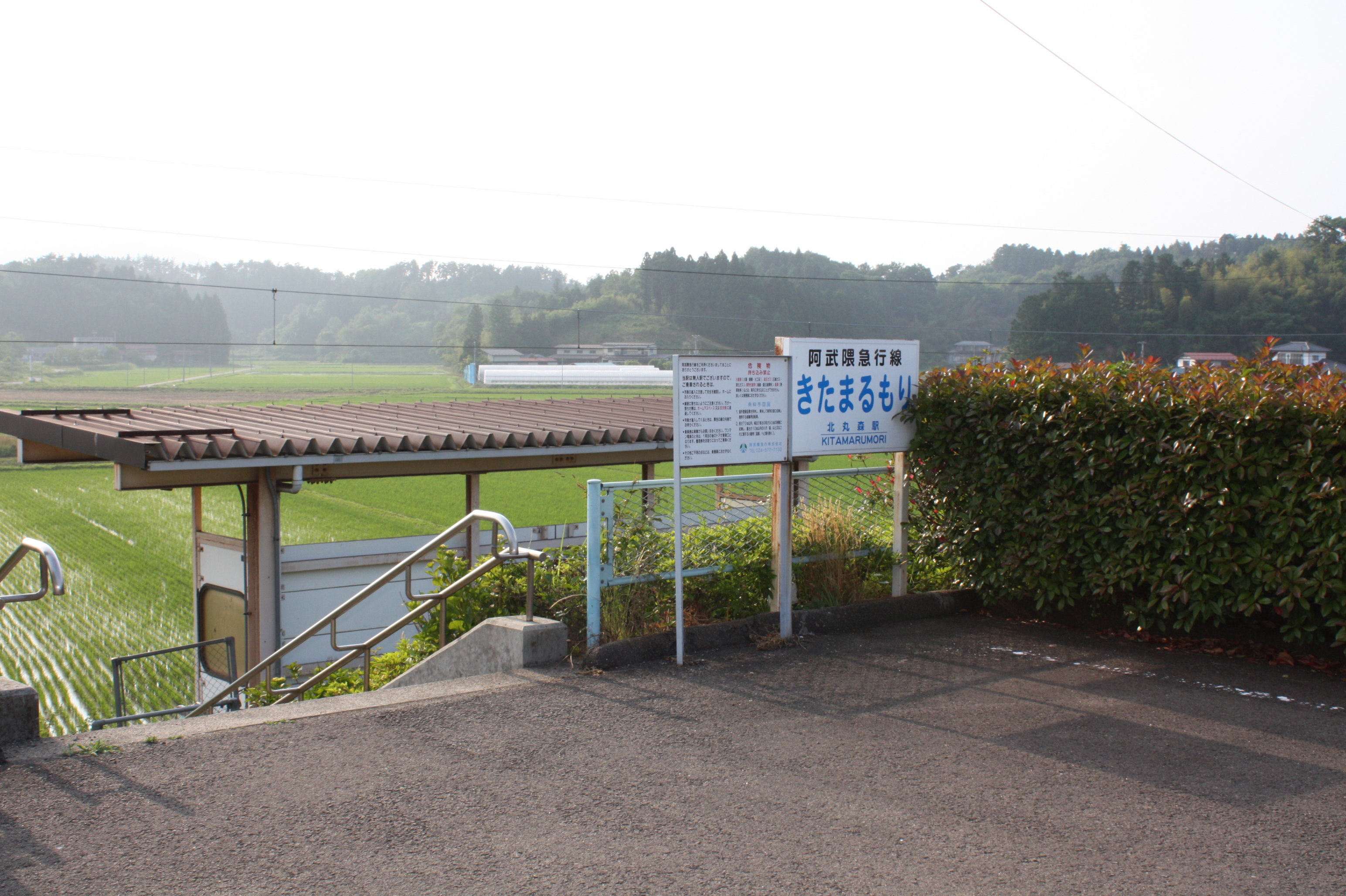
- Kitamarumori Station, June 2008

General information
- Location: Tateyama-Kinuma, Marumori-machi, Igu-gun, District, Miyagi-ken 981-2106; Japan
- Coordinates: 37°56′34.70″N 140°46′18.99″E
- Operator: AbukumaExpress
- Line: ■ Abukuma Express Line
- Distance: 39.2 km from Fukushima
- Platforms: 1 side platform
- Tracks: 1

Other information
- Status: Unstaffed
- Website: Official website

History
- Opened: July 1, 1986
Location
- Location within Miyagi Prefecture Location within Japan

Kitamarumori Station (北丸森駅, Kitamarumori eki) is a railway station in the town of Marumori, Miyagi Prefecture, Japan, operated by the third-sector railway operator AbukumaExpress

== Lines ==
Kitamarumori Station is served by the Abukuma Express Line, and is located 39.2 rail kilometers from the official starting point of the line at Fukushima .

== Station layout ==
The station has one side platform serving a single bi-directional track. There is no station building, but only a shelter built on the platform. The station is unattended.

== Adjacent stations ==
«	Service	»
Abukuma Express Line
Rapid: Does not stop at this station
Marumori	Local	Minami-Kakuda

== History ==
Kitamarumori Station opened with the start of operations of the Abukuma Express on July 1, 1986.

== Surrounding area ==
- National Route 113

== See also ==
- List of railway stations in Japan
