= Yanagawa Kibōnomori Kōen-mae Station =

Railway station in Date, Fukushima Prefecture, Japan

Yanagawa Kibōnomori Kōen-mae Station やながわ希望の森公園前駅
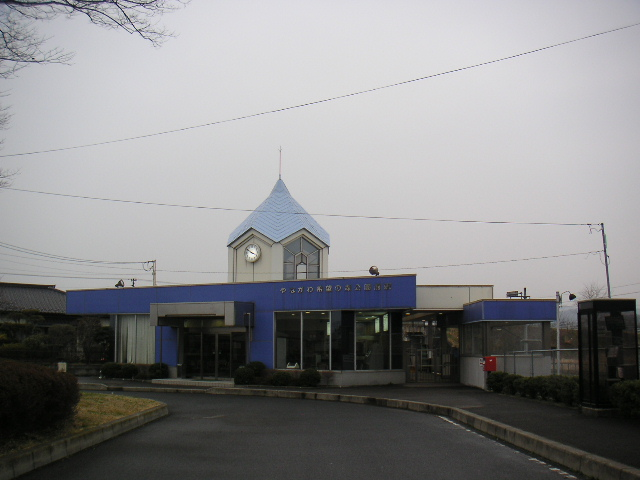
- Yanagawa Kibōnomori Kōen-mae Station, April 2006

General information
- Location: Yanagawa-cho Kitamachigashira, Date-shi, Fukushima-ken 960-0600; Japan
- Coordinates: 37°51′29.57″N 140°36′56.85″E
- Operator: AbukumaExpress
- Line: ■ Abukuma Express Line
- Platforms: 1 side platform

Other information
- Status: Unstaffed
- Website: http://www.abukyu.co.jp/about/time-table/nobori/post-13.html

History
- Opened: July 1, 1988

Passengers
- FY2015: 197(daily)
Location
- Location within Fukushima Prefecture Location within Japan

Yanagawa Kibōnomori Kōen-mae Station (やながわ希望の森公園前駅, Yanagawa Kibōnomori Kōen-mae-eki) is a railway station on Abukuma Kyuko's Abukuma Express Line in the city of Date, Fukushima Japan.

== Lines ==
Yanagawa Kibōnomori Kōen-mae Station is served by the Abukuma Express Line, and is located 20.0 rail kilometres from the official starting point of the line at Fukushima.

== Station layout ==
Yanagawa Kibōnomori Kōen-mae Station has one side platform serving a single bi-directional track. The station is unattended.

== Adjacent stations ==
«	Service	»
Abukuma Express Line
Rapid: Does not stop at this station
Yanagawa	Local	Tomino

== History ==
Yanagawa Kibōnomori Kōen-mae Station opened on July 1, 1988.

In 2002, it was chosen to be one of 100 stations representing the Tōhoku region.

== Passenger statistics ==
In fiscal 2015, the station was used by an average of 197 passengers daily (boarding passengers only).

== Surrounding area ==
- Yanagawa Kibōnomori Kōen
- Yanagawa Post Office
