= Niida Station (Fukushima) =

Railway station in Date, Fukushima Prefecture, Japan

Niida Station 二井田駅
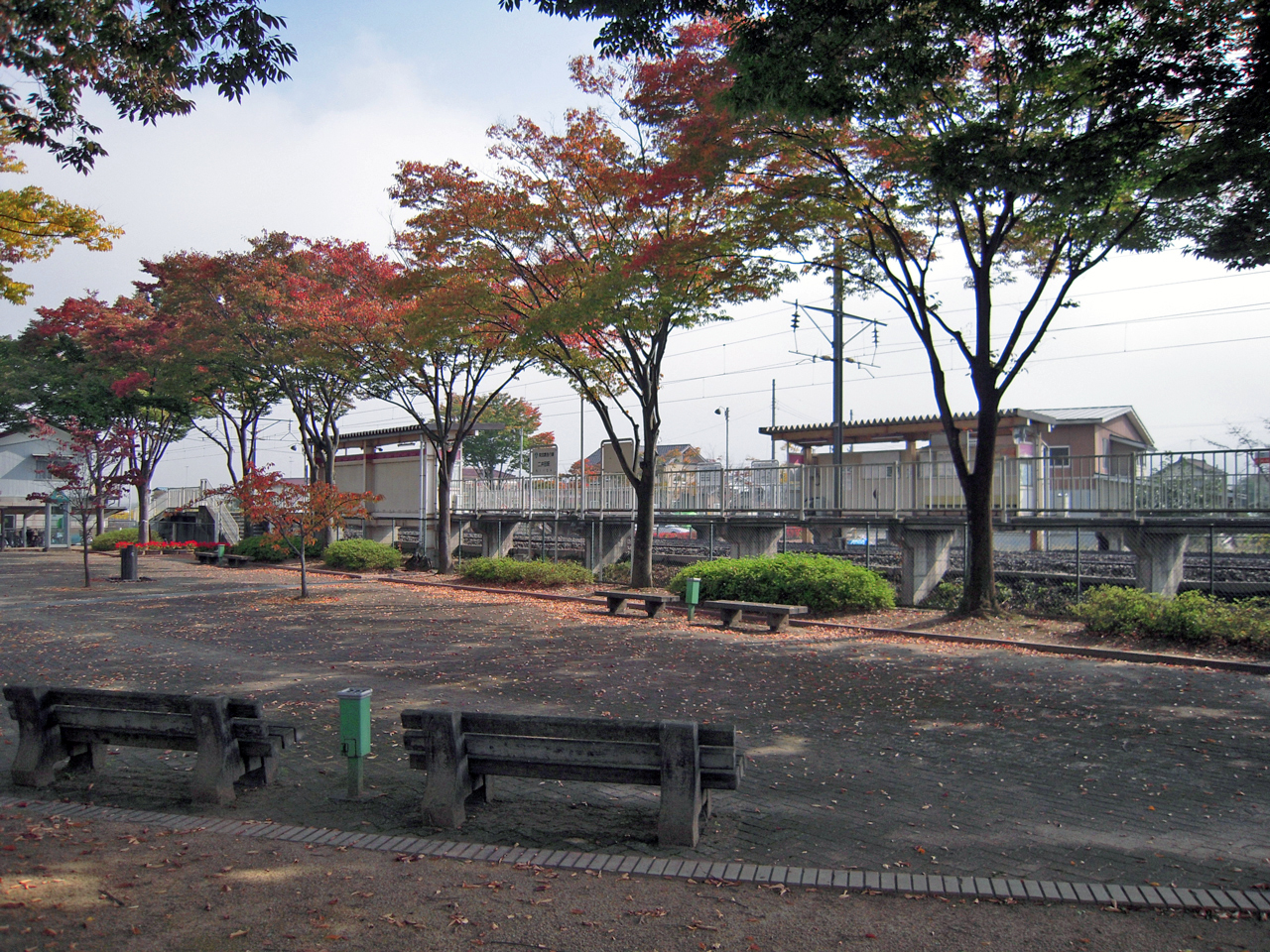
- Niida Station, October 2008

General information
- Location: Maebara Hobaramachi, Date-shi, Fukushima-ken 960-0633; Japan
- Coordinates: 37°49′40.75″N 140°34′49.65″E
- Operator: AbukumaExpress
- Line: ■ Abukuma Express Line
- Distance: 15.4 km from Fukushima
- Platforms: 1 side platform

Other information
- Status: Unstaffed
- Website: http://www.abukyu.co.jp/about/time-table/nobori/post-23.html

History
- Opened: July 1, 1988

Passengers
- FY2015: 38 (daily)
Location
- Location within Fukushima Prefecture Location within Japan

Niida Station (二井田駅, Niida-eki) is a railway station on the AbukumaExpress in the city of Date, Fukushima Japan.

== Lines ==
Niida Station is served by the Abukuma Express Line, and is located 15.4 rail kilometres from the official starting point of the line at Fukushima.

== Station layout ==
Niida Station has two opposed side platforms connected by a level crossing. There is no station building. The station is unattended.

== Adjacent stations ==
«	Service	»
Abukuma Express Line
Rapid: Does not stop at this station
Ōizumi	Local	Nitta

== History ==
Niida Station opened on July 1, 1988.

== Passenger statistics ==
In fiscal 2015, the station was used by an average of 38 passengers daily (boarding passengers only).

== Surrounding area ==
The station is located in a suburban agricultural district of Date.

== See also ==
- List of railway stations in Japan
