= Kabuto Station (Fukushima) =

Railway station in Date, Fukushima Prefecture, Japan

Kabuto Station 兜駅
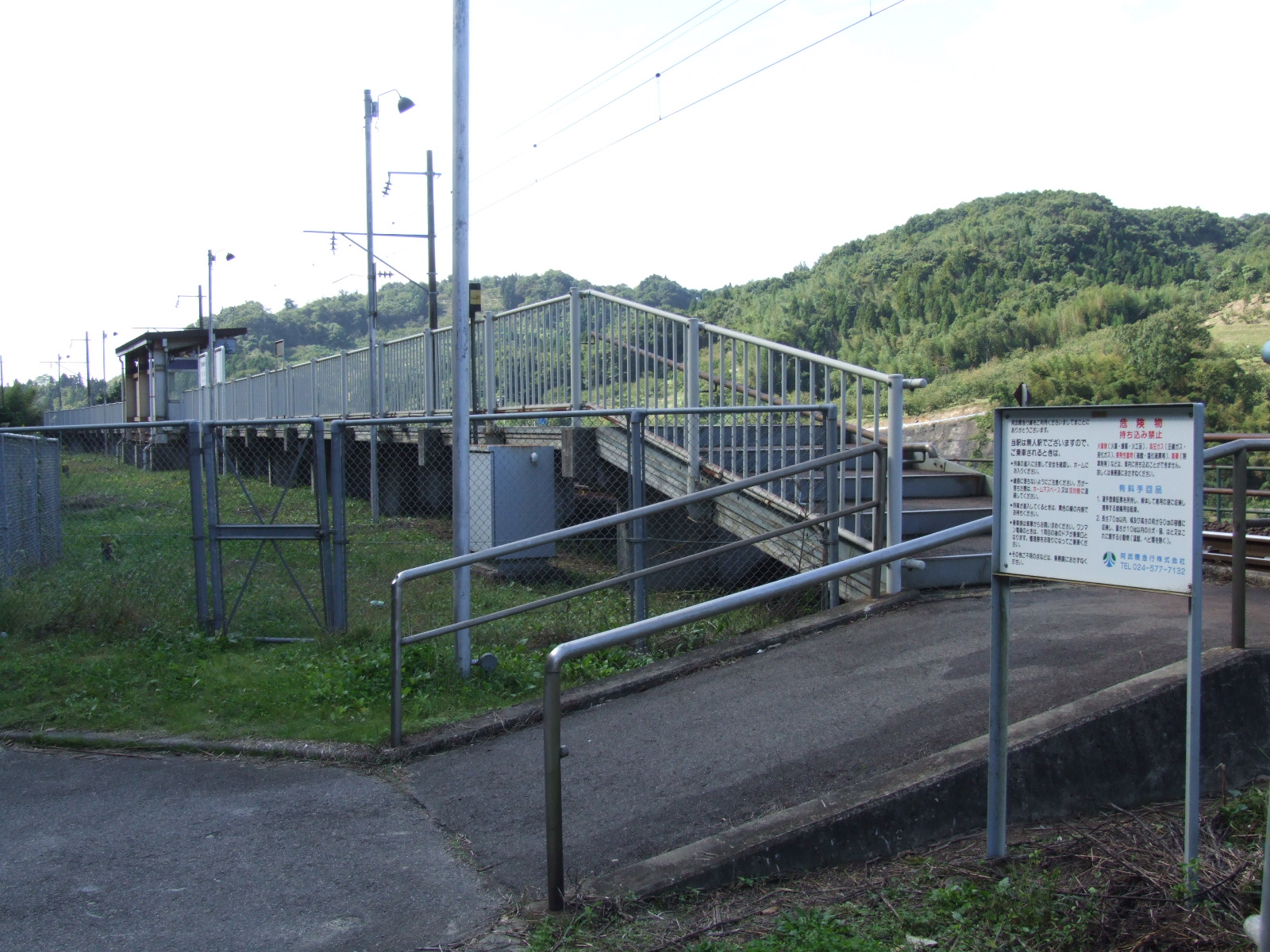
- Kabuto Station, October 2006

General information
- Location: Yanagawamachi Funyu, Date-shi, Fukushima-ken 960-0704; Japan
- Coordinates: 37°53′44″N 140°38′48″E
- Operator: AbukumaExpress
- Line: ■ Abukuma Express Line
- Distance: 25.2 km from Fukushima
- Platforms: 1 side platform

Other information
- Status: Unstaffed
- Website: http://www.abukyu.co.jp/about/time-table/nobori/post-11.html

History
- Opened: July 1, 1988

Passengers
- FY2015: 3 (daily)
Location
- Location within Fukushima Prefecture Location within Japan

Kabuto Station (兜駅, Kabuto-eki) is a railway station on the AbukumaExpress in the city of Date, Fukushima Japan.

== Lines ==
Kabuto Station is served by the Abukuma Express Line, and is located 25.2 rail kilometres from the official starting point of the line at Fukushima.

== Station layout ==
Kabuto Station has one side platform serving a single bi-directional track. There is no station building and the station is unattended

== Adjacent stations ==
«	Service	»
Abukuma Express Line
Rapid: Does not stop at this station
Tomino	Local	Abukuma

== History ==
Kabuto Station opened on July 1, 1988.

== Passenger statistics ==
In fiscal 2015, the station was used by an average of 3 passengers daily (boarding passengers only).

== Surrounding area ==
The station is located in a rural area surrounded by farms and orchards. There are no villages or houses around the station, which is built on an embankment to avoid period flooding by the Abukuma River.

== See also ==
- List of railway stations in Japan
