= Takako Station =

Railway station in Date, Fukushima Prefecture, Japan

Takako Station 高子駅
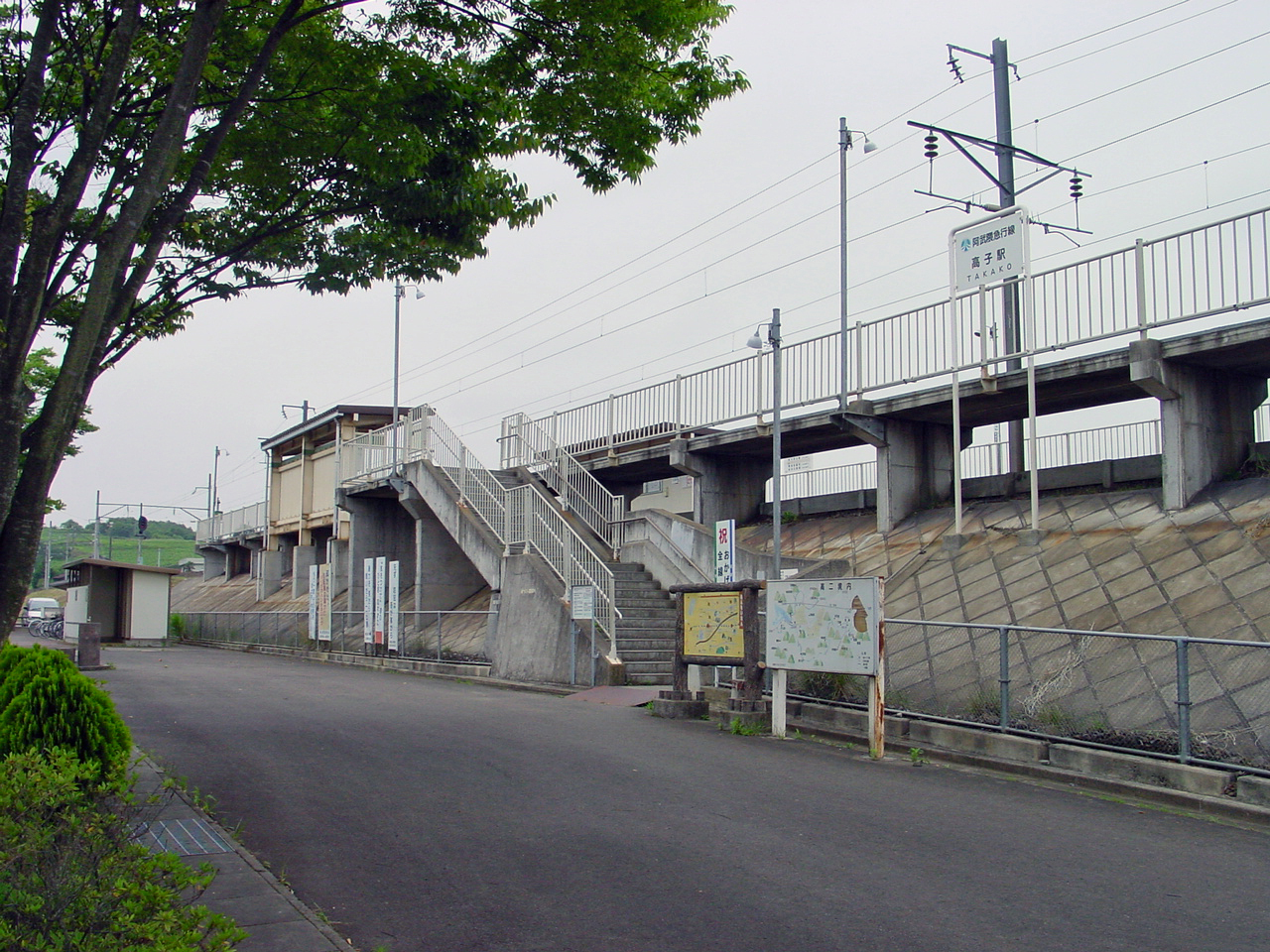
- Takako Station, July 2003

General information
- Location: Mukaidai Hobaramachi Kamihobara, Date-shi, Fukushima-ken 960-0684; Japan
- Coordinates: 37°48′30.38″N 140°31′38.27″E
- Operator: AbukumaExpress
- Line: ■ Abukuma Express Line
- Distance: 10.1 km from Fukushima
- Platforms: 2 side platforms

Other information
- Status: Unstaffed
- Website: http://www.abukyu.co.jp/about/time-table/nobori/post-19.html

History
- Opened: July 1, 1988

Passengers
- FY2015: 63 (daily)
Location
- Location within Fukushima Prefecture Location within Japan

Takako Station (高子駅, Takako-eki) is a railway station on the AbukumaExpress in the city of Date, Fukushima Japan.

== Lines ==
Takako Station is served by the Abukuma Express Line, and is located 10.1 rail kilometres from the official starting point of the line at Fukushima.

== Station layout ==
Takako Station has two elevated opposed side platforms There is no station building, and the station is unattended.

== Adjacent stations ==
«	Service	»
Abukuma Express Line
Rapid: Does not stop at this station
Mukaisenoue	Local	Kamihobara

== History ==
Takako Station opened on July 1, 1988.

== Passenger statistics ==
In fiscal 2015, the station was used by an average of 63 passengers daily (boarding passengers only).

== Surrounding area ==
- Takako "Hightown"
- Fukushima Prefectural Route 4 (Fukushima Hobara Line)
- Takako Lake - one of the Takako Ni-juu Kyou (Takako twenty scenic views)
- Kameoka Hachimangū (founded here, now located in Sendai)
- Takakogaoka Hall Remains
- Awashima Shrine
- Takako Community Center
- Kumasaka Family Tomb

== See also ==
- List of railway stations in Japan
