= Oroshimachi Station (Fukushima) =

Railway station in Fukushima, Fukushima Prefecture, Japan

Oroshimachi Station 卸町駅
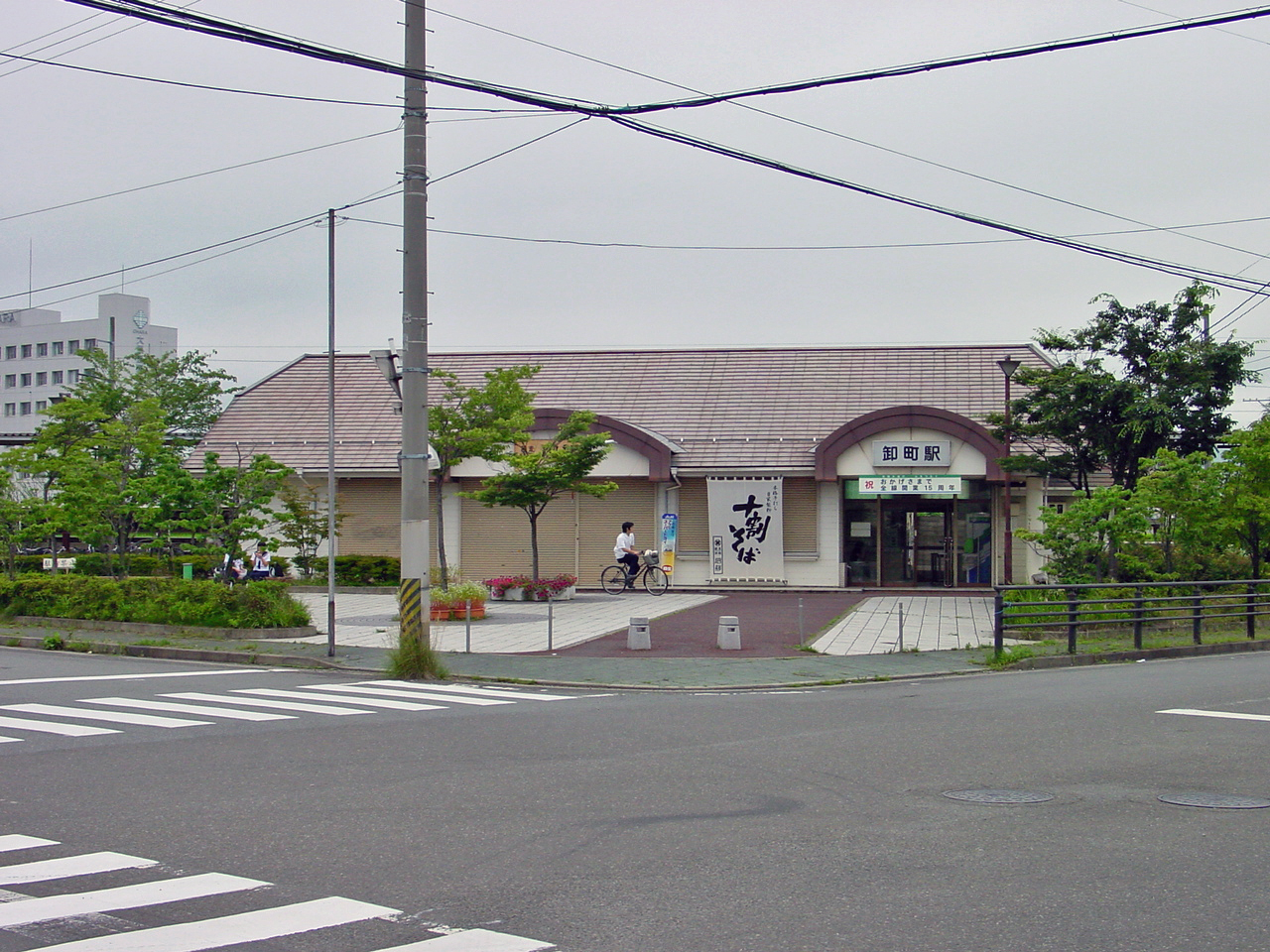
- Oroshimachi Station, July 2003

General information
- Location: Oyanagi Kamata; Fukushima; Japan
- Coordinates: 37°47′43.39″N 140°28′47.14″E
- Operator: Abukuma Express
- Distance: 5.6 km (3.5 mi) from Fukushima
- Platforms: 1 side platform
- Tracks: 1

Construction
- Structure type: At-grade

Other information
- Status: Unstaffed

History
- Opened: 1 July 1988

Passengers
- FY2015: 333 (daily)

Services
Preceding station	Abukuma Express	Following station
Fukushima Terminus	Abukuma Express Line	Fukushima Gakuin-mae toward Tsukinoki
Location
- Location within Fukushima Prefecture Location within Japan

Oroshimachi Station (Japanese: 卸町駅, Hepburn: Oroshimachi-eki) is a railway station on the Abukuma Express Line in the city of Fukushima, Fukushima Prefecture, Japan.

== Lines ==
Oroshimachi Station is served by the Abukuma Express Line, and is located 5.6 kilometres (3.5 mi) from the official starting point of the line at Fukushima.

== Station layout ==
Oroshimachi Station has one side platform serving a single bi-directional track. The station is unattended.

== History ==
Oroshimachi Station opened on July 1, 1988.

== Passenger statistics ==
In fiscal 2015, the station was used by an average of 333 passengers daily (boarding passengers only).

== Surrounding area ==
- Fukushima Central Wholesale Market
- Oroshimachi housing area

== See also ==
- List of railway stations in Japan
