= Yanagawa Station (Fukushima) =

Railway station in Date, Fukushima Prefecture, Japan

Yanagawa Station 梁川駅
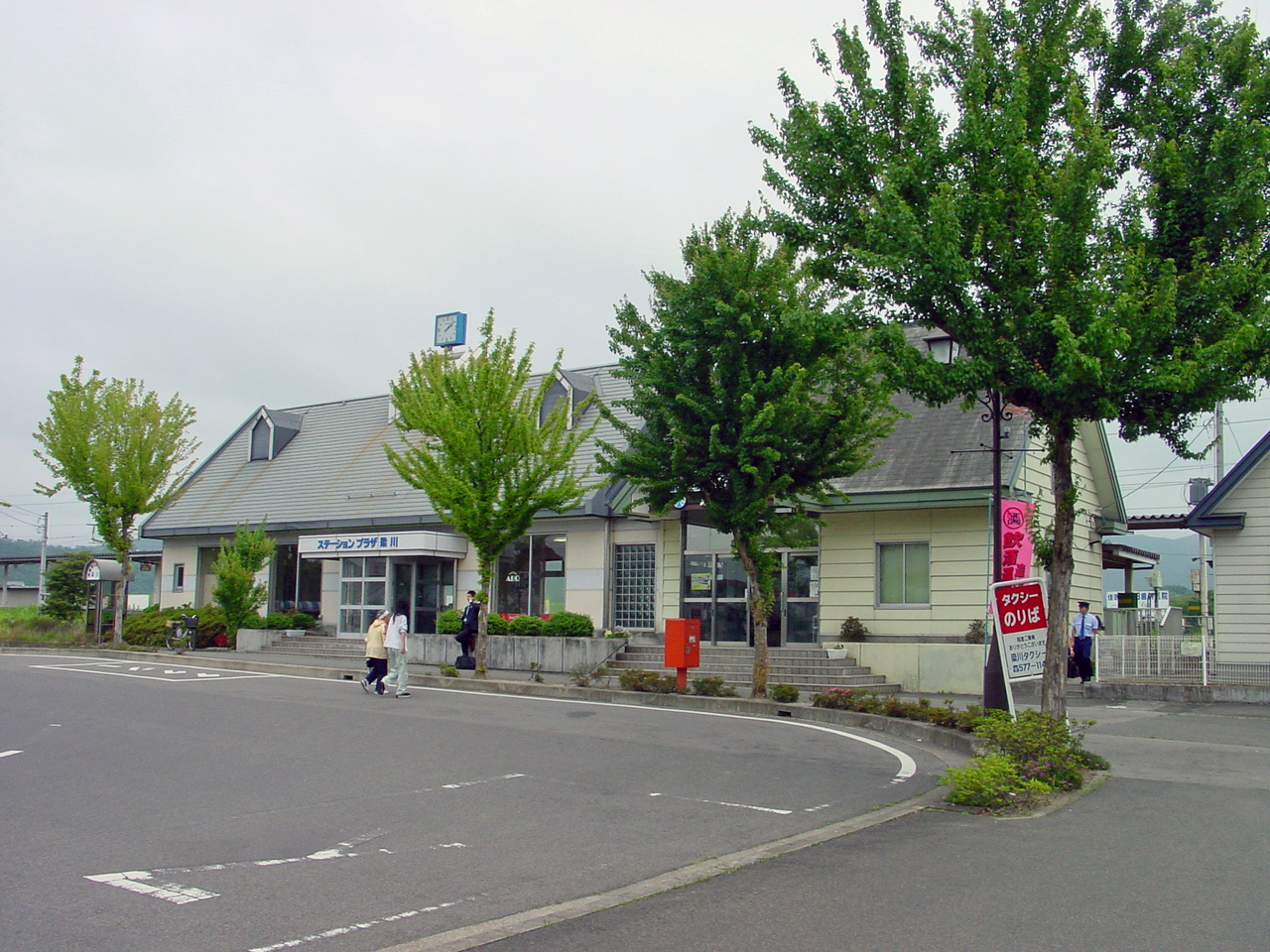
- Yanagawa Station, July 2003

General information
- Location: Aoba-cho, Date-shi, Fukushima-ken 960-0600; Japan
- Coordinates: 37°50′45.38″N 140°36′10.95″E
- Operator: AbukumaExpress
- Line: ■ Abukuma Express Line
- Platforms: 1 island platform

Other information
- Status: Staffed
- Website: http://www.abukyu.co.jp/about/time-table/nobori/post-25.html

History
- Opened: July 1, 1988

Passengers
- FY2015: 254 (daily)
Location
- Location within Fukushima Prefecture Location within Japan

Yanagawa Station (梁川駅, Yanagawa-eki) is a railway station on the AbukumaExpress in the city of Date, Fukushima Japan.

== Lines ==
Yanagawa Station is served by the Abukuma Express Line, and is located 18.3 rail kilometres from the official starting point of the line at Fukushima.

== Station layout ==
Yanagawa Station has a one island platform connected to the station building by a level crossing. The station is attended.

== Adjacent stations ==
«	Service	»
Abukuma Express Line
Rapid: Does not stop at this station
Nitta	Local	Yanagawa Kibōnomori Kōen-mae

== History ==
Yanagawa Station opened on July 1, 1988.

== Passenger statistics ==
In fiscal 2015, the station was used by an average of 254 passengers daily (boarding passengers only).

== Surrounding area ==
- former Yanagawa Town Hall
- Abukuma Express head office
