= Abukuma Station =

Railway station in Marumori, Miyagi Prefecture, Japan

Abukuma Station あぶくま駅
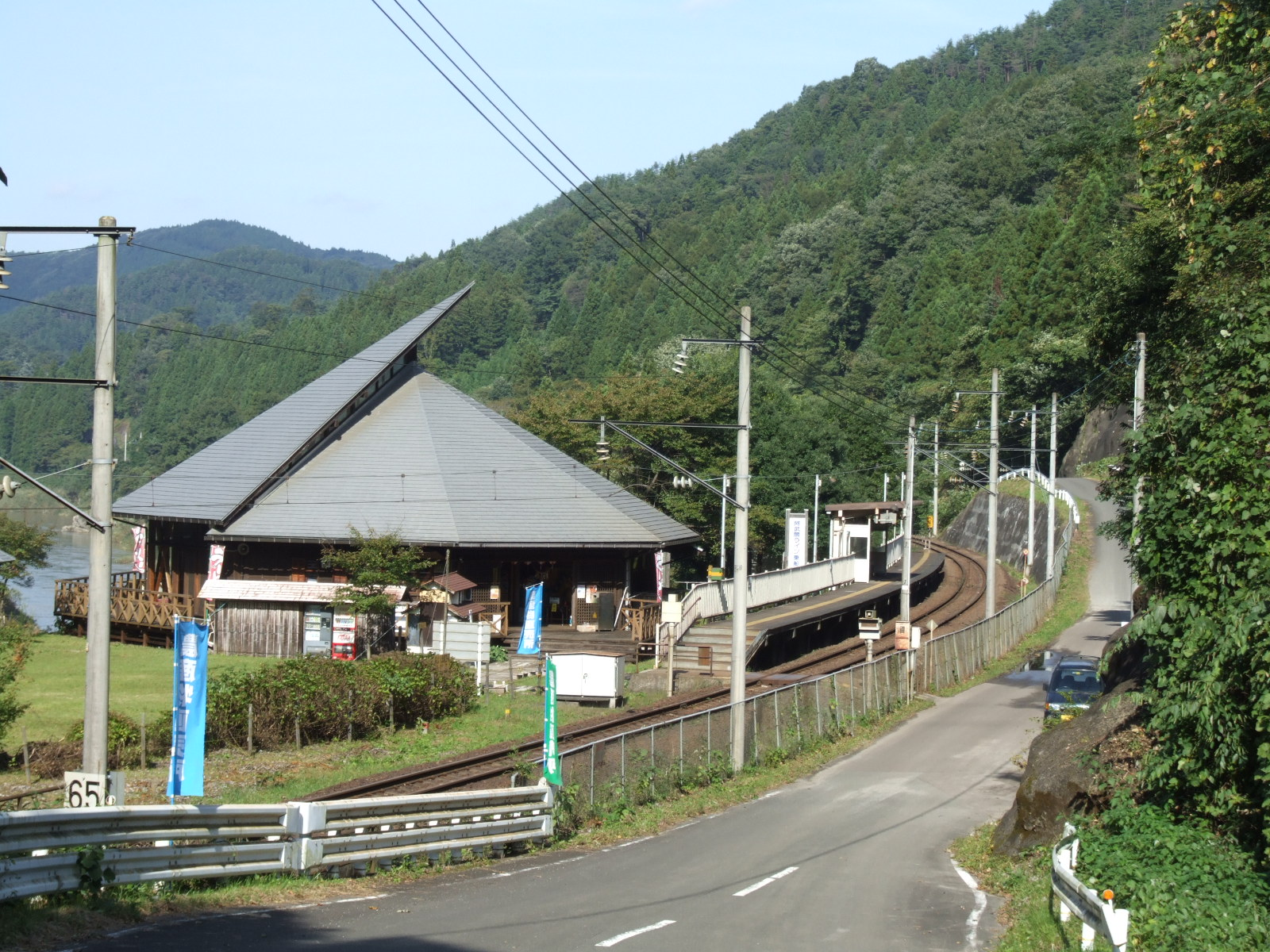
- Abukuma Station, July 2003

General information
- Location: Mawarigura, Marumori-machi, Igu-gun, Miyagi-ken 981-2185; Japan
- Coordinates: 37°54′48.95″N 140°41′9.65″E
- Operator: AbukumaExpress
- Line: ■ Abukuma Express Line
- Distance: 29.4 km from Fukushima
- Platforms: 1 side platform
- Tracks: 1

Other information
- Status: Unstaffed
- Website: Official website

History
- Opened: July 1, 1988
Location
- Location within Miyagi Prefecture Location within Japan

Abukuma Station (あぶくま駅, Abukuma eki) is a railway station in the town of Marumori, Miyagi Prefecture, Japan, operated by the third-sector railway operator AbukumaExpress.

== Lines ==
Abukuma Station is served by the Abukuma Express Line, and is located 29.4 rail kilometres from the official starting point of the line at Fukushima.

== Station layout ==
The station has one side platform serving a single bi-directional track. The station building is an octagonal structure. The station is unattended.

== Adjacent stations ==
«	Service	»
Abukuma Express Line
Rapid: Does not stop at this station
Kabuto	Local	Marumori

== History ==
Abukuma Station opened on July 1, 1988.

== Surrounding area ==
There are no villages or houses around the station. The station building sells tickets for the adjacent Abukuma Line's riverport, from where tourist ships depart between April and November.

- Abukuma River

== See also ==
- List of Railway Stations in Japan
