= Marumori, Miyagi =

Marumori 丸森町
- Town
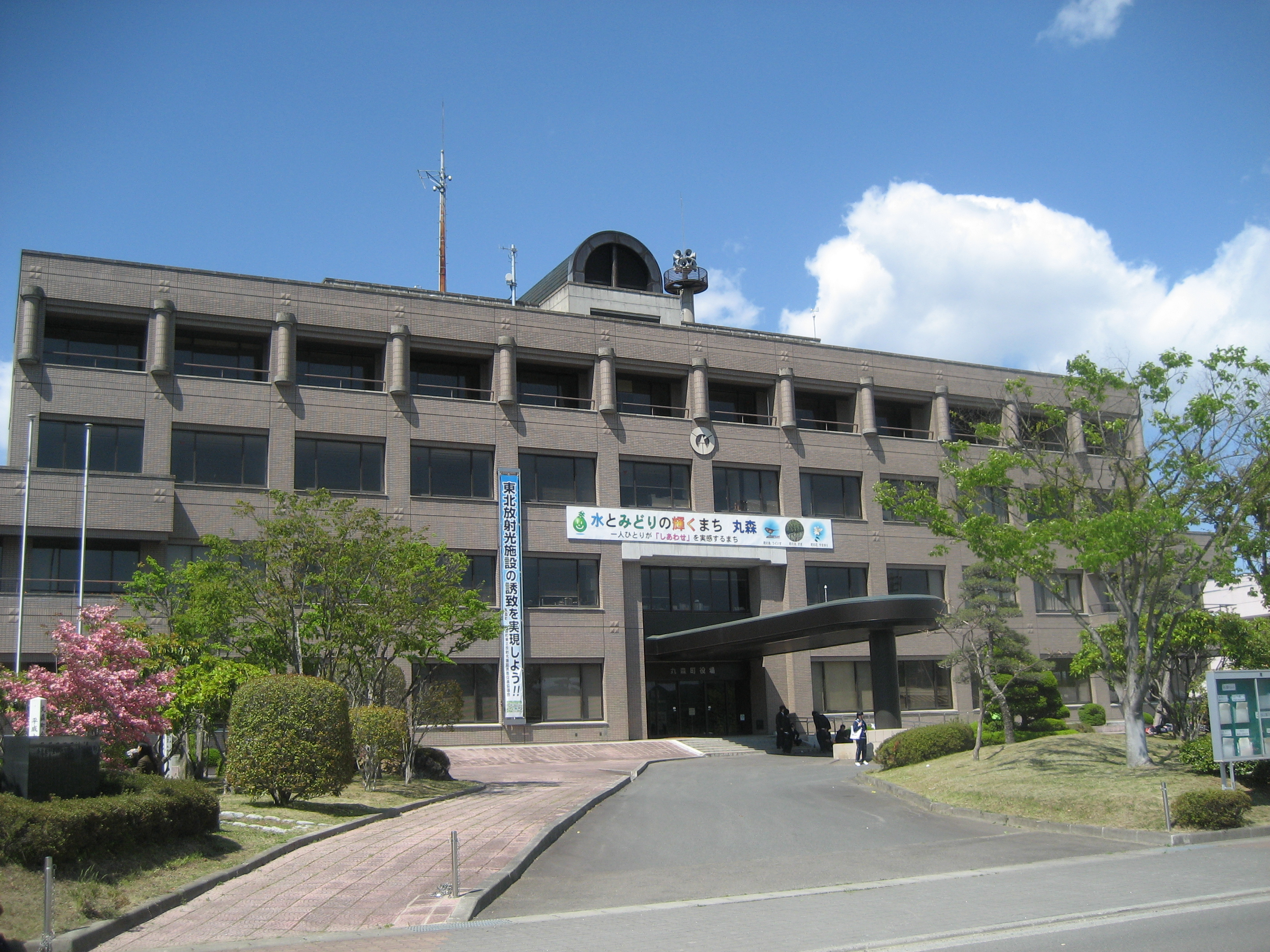
- Marumori Town Office

- Flag Seal

- Location of Marumori in Miyagi Prefecture

- Coordinates: 37°54′41.2″N 140°45′55.4″E
- Country: Japan
- Region: Tōhoku
- Prefecture: Miyagi
- District: Igu

Area
  - Total: 273.30 km^{2} (105.52 sq mi)

Population (June 1, 2020)
  - Total: 13,092
  - Density: 47.903/km^{2} (124.07/sq mi)
- Time zone: UTC+9 (Japan Standard Time)
- Phone number: 0224-72-2111
- Address: 120 Torii, Marumori-machi, Igu-gun, Miyagi-ken 981-2192
- Climate: Cfa
- Website: Official website
- Symbols
- Bird: Japanese bush warbler
- Flower: Lilium auratum
- Tree: Cryptomeria

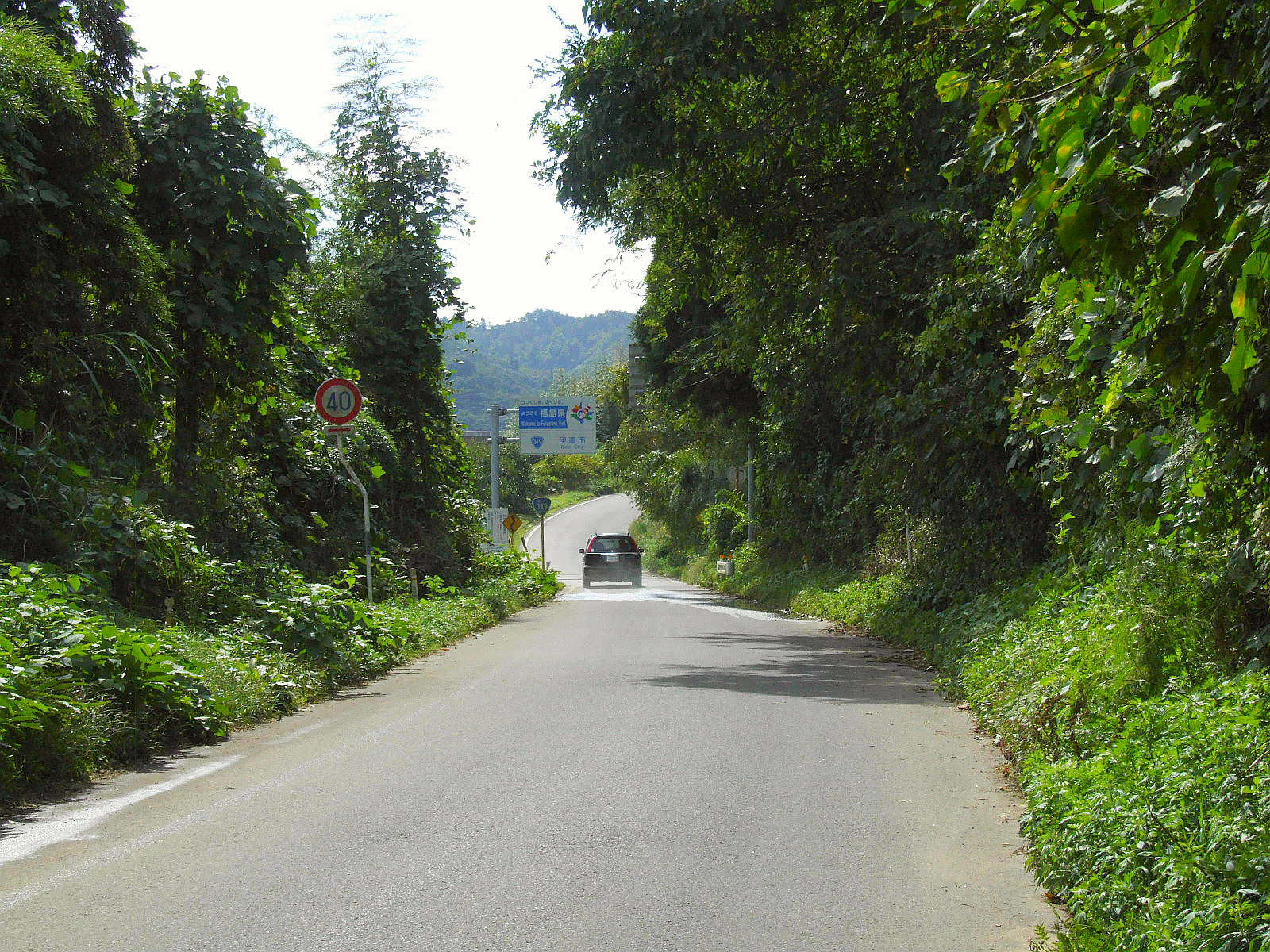
Japan National Route 349 in Marumori

Marumori (丸森町, Marumori-machi) is a town located in Miyagi Prefecture, Japan. As of 1 June 2020, the town had an estimated population of 13,092, and a population density of 48 persons per km^{2} in 5,050 households. The total area of the town is 273.30 square kilometres (105.52 sq mi).

== Geography ==
Marumori is located in the extreme southern portion of Miyagi Prefecture in the Tōhoku region of northern Japan, bordered by Fukushima Prefecture to the south, east and west. The name “Marumori” means "circle forest" in Japanese and the town is located in a circular basin surrounded by heavily forested mountains. The Abukuma River passes through the town.

=== Neighboring municipalities ===
Fukushima Prefecture

- Date
- Shinchi
- Sōma

Miyagi Prefecture

- Kakuda
- Shiroishi
- Yamamoto

=== Climate ===
Marumori has a humid subtropical climate (Köppen climate classification Cfa) characterized by mild summers and cold winters. The average annual temperature in Marumori is 12.2 °C (54.0 °F). The average annual rainfall is 1,298.7 mm (51.13 in) with September as the wettest month. The temperatures are highest on average in August, at around 24.0 °C (75.2 °F), and lowest in January, at around 1.3 °C (34.3 °F).

Climate data for Marumori (1991−2020 normals, extremes 1977−present)
Month	Jan	Feb	Mar	Apr	May	Jun	Jul	Aug	Sep	Oct	Nov	Dec	Year
Record high °C (°F)	17.1 (62.8)	21.3 (70.3)	25.5 (77.9)	31.8 (89.2)	34.2 (93.6)	35.6 (96.1)	37.6 (99.7)	37.2 (99.0)	35.6 (96.1)	30.8 (87.4)	26.3 (79.3)	20.8 (69.4)	37.6 (99.7)
Mean daily maximum °C (°F)	6.0 (42.8)	6.9 (44.4)	10.6 (51.1)	16.4 (61.5)	21.2 (70.2)	23.8 (74.8)	27.1 (80.8)	28.6 (83.5)	25.1 (77.2)	20.0 (68.0)	14.5 (58.1)	8.8 (47.8)	17.4 (63.4)
Daily mean °C (°F)	1.3 (34.3)	1.8 (35.2)	4.9 (40.8)	10.3 (50.5)	15.7 (60.3)	19.2 (66.6)	22.8 (73.0)	24.0 (75.2)	20.3 (68.5)	14.4 (57.9)	8.4 (47.1)	3.6 (38.5)	12.2 (54.0)
Mean daily minimum °C (°F)	−3.7 (25.3)	−3.4 (25.9)	−1.0 (30.2)	3.7 (38.7)	10.2 (50.4)	15.2 (59.4)	19.3 (66.7)	20.3 (68.5)	16.2 (61.2)	9.2 (48.6)	2.6 (36.7)	−1.5 (29.3)	7.3 (45.1)
Record low °C (°F)	−15.7 (3.7)	−16.7 (1.9)	−13.3 (8.1)	−7.5 (18.5)	−0.1 (31.8)	6.0 (42.8)	10.8 (51.4)	11.1 (52.0)	4.3 (39.7)	−2.5 (27.5)	−5.7 (21.7)	−12.8 (9.0)	−16.7 (1.9)
Average precipitation mm (inches)	52.9 (2.08)	35.8 (1.41)	73.7 (2.90)	90.9 (3.58)	99.9 (3.93)	126.8 (4.99)	176.0 (6.93)	169.0 (6.65)	210.0 (8.27)	168.0 (6.61)	57.6 (2.27)	38.9 (1.53)	1,298.7 (51.13)
Average precipitation days (≥ 1.0 mm)	6.0	5.1	8.0	8.0	9.4	11.7	14.2	12.3	12.3	9.1	5.8	6.1	108
Mean monthly sunshine hours	168.1	165.4	187.2	190.7	193.3	142.2	130.4	152.5	125.9	143.0	148.7	154.6	1,901.2
Source: Japan Meteorological Agency

== Demographics ==
Per Japanese census data, the population of Marumori has declined over the past 70 years.

Historical population
Year	Pop.	±%
1920	22,803	—
1930	24,121	+5.8%
1940	24,449	+1.4%
1950	29,898	+22.3%
1960	26,740	−10.6%
1970	22,027	−17.6%
1980	20,849	−5.3%
1990	19,755	−5.2%
2000	17,868	−9.6%
2010	15,501	−13.2%
2020	12,262	−20.9%

== History ==
The area of present-day Marumori was part of ancient Mutsu Province and was part of the holdings of Sendai Domain under the Edo period Tokugawa shogunate. The village of Marumori was established on April 1, 1889, with the establishment of the post-Meiji restoration modern municipalities system. It was raised to town status on December 1, 1954, after merging with the neighboring villages of Kaneyama, Ōuchi, Ōhari, Kōya, Kosai, Tateyama and Hippo.

== Government ==
Marumori has a mayor-council form of government with a directly elected mayor and a unicameral town council of 14 members. Marumori, together with the city of Kakuda, contributes one seat to the Miyagi Prefectural legislature. In terms of national politics, the town is part of Miyagi 3rd district of the lower house of the Diet of Japan.

== Economy ==
The economy of Marumori is largely based on agriculture and forestry.

== Education ==
As of April 2022, Marumori has two public elementary schools and one public junior high school operated by the town government, and one public high school operated by the Miyagi Prefectural Board of Education. There is also one private elementary school.

== Transportation ==
=== Railway ===
AbukumaExpress - Abukuma Express Line

- Abukuma - Marumori - Kita-Marumori

=== Highway ===
- National Route 113
- National Route 349

== Sister cities ==
- (United States) Hemet, California, USA
- Kitami, Hokkaido, Japan
