= Abukuma Express Line =

Railway line in Fukushima & Miyagi Prefectures, Japan

Abukuma Express Line (Abukuma Kyuko Line)
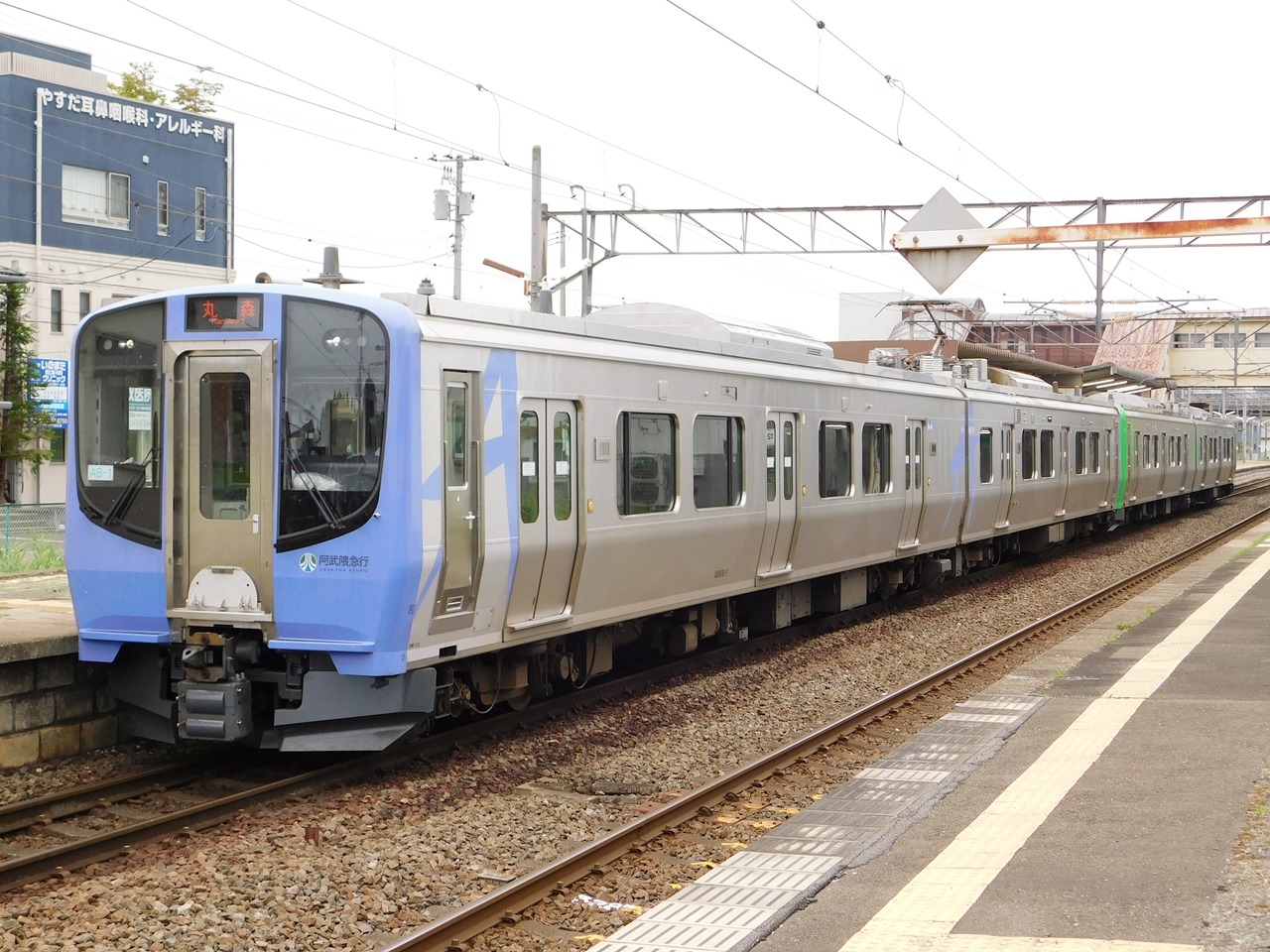
- Abukuma Express Line AB900 series train at Tsukinoki Station

Overview
- Status: Operational
- Owner: Abukuma Express
- Locale: Tohoku region
- Termini: Fukushima; Tsukinoki
- Stations: 23

Service
- Type: Heavy rail

History
- Opened: 1 April 1968; 58 years ago

Technical
- Line length: 54.9 km (34.1 mi)
- Track gauge: 1,067 mm (3 ft 6 in)
- Minimum radius: 500 m (1,600 ft)
- Electrification: Overhead line, 20 kV 50 Hz AC
- Operating speed: 95 km/h (59 mph)
Route map
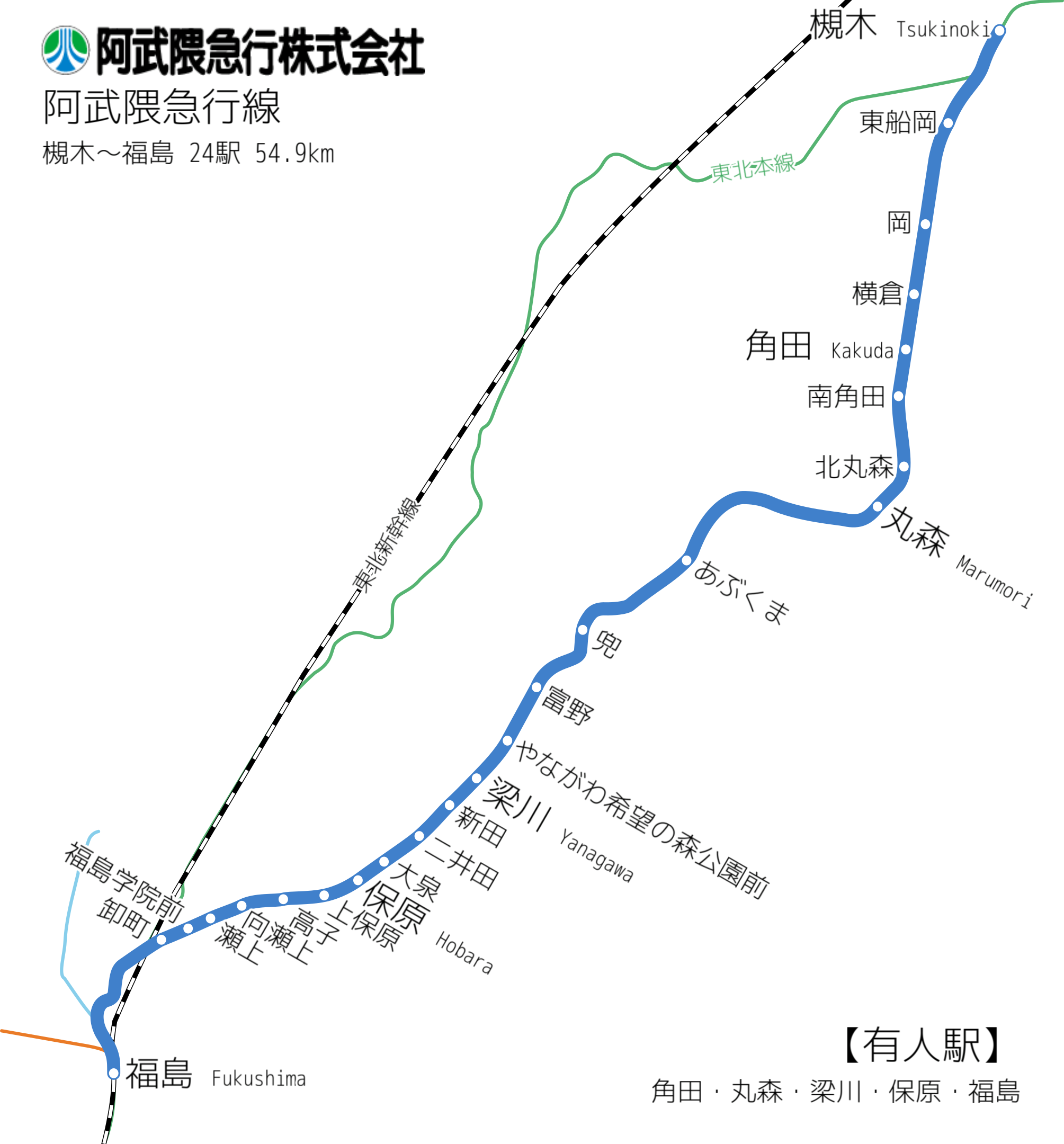

The Abukuma Express Line (Japanese: 阿武隈急行線, Hepburn: Abukuma Kyūkō-sen) is a railway line in Japan, owned and operated by the third-sector operator Abukuma Express. Opened in April 1968, the line connects Fukushima Station in Fukushima Prefecture and Tsukinoki Station in Miyagi Prefecture. Both of these stations are also on the Tōhoku Main Line operated by East Japan Railway Company (JR East).

== Station list ==
Station	Distance from Fukushima km (mi)	Transfers	Location	
Fukushima	0 (0)	Tōhoku Shinkansen; Yamagata Shinkansen; Tōhoku Main Line; Yamagata Line; Iizaka Line	Fukushima	Fukushima; Prefecture
Oroshimachi	5.6 (3.5)		Fukushima	Fukushima; Prefecture
Fukushima Gakuin-mae	6.5 (4.0)		Fukushima	Fukushima; Prefecture
Senoue	7.5 (4.7)		Fukushima	Fukushima; Prefecture
Mukaisenoue	8.6 (5.3)		Fukushima	Fukushima; Prefecture
Takako	10.1 (6.3)		Date	Fukushima; Prefecture
Kamihobara	11.5 (7.1)		Date	Fukushima; Prefecture
Hobara	12.8 (8.0)		Date	Fukushima; Prefecture
Ōizumi	13.9 (8.6)		Date	Fukushima; Prefecture
Niida	15.4 (9.6)		Date	Fukushima; Prefecture
Nitta	17.0 (10.6)		Date	Fukushima; Prefecture
Yanagawa	18.3 (11.4)		Date	Fukushima; Prefecture
Yanagawa Kibōnomori Kōen-mae	20.0 (12.4)		Date	Fukushima; Prefecture
Tomino	22.1 (13.7)		Date	Fukushima; Prefecture
Kabuto	25.2 (15.7)		Date	Fukushima; Prefecture
Abukuma	29.4 (18.3)		Marumori	Miyagi Prefecture
Marumori	37.5 (23.3)		Marumori	Miyagi Prefecture
Kita-Marumori	39.2 (24.4)		Marumori	Miyagi Prefecture
Minami-Kakuda	41.6 (25.8)		Kakuda	Miyagi Prefecture
Kakuda	43.3 (26.9)		Kakuda	Miyagi Prefecture
Yokokura	45.2 (28.1)		Kakuda	Miyagi Prefecture
Oka	47.7 (29.6)		Kakuda	Miyagi Prefecture
Higashi-Funaoka	51.3 (31.9)		Shibata	Miyagi Prefecture
Tsukinoki	54.9 (34.1)	Tōhoku Main Line	Shibata	Miyagi Prefecture

== History ==
The line opened on 1 April 1968 as the Marumori Line (丸森線), operated by Japanese National Railways (JNR) between Tsukinoki and Marumori. It was originally planned as a bypass between Fukushima and Marumori to relieve congestion on the Tōhoku Main Line, but plans to extend the route were suspended after the Tōhoku Main Line was double-tracked. In September 1981, as JNR's financial situation deteriorated, the line was proposed for closure.

In response, local and prefectural governments along the route established a third-sector railway operator, Abukuma Express, to take over operations. An application for a railway operating license covering the full route between Fukushima and Marumori was submitted on 24 December 1984. The license was granted on 27 February 1985, followed by approval of construction works on 2 March 1985, allowing electrification of the existing section and the resumption of construction on previously unfinished segments.

Ownership of the line was transferred to Abukuma Express on 1 July 1986, with services initially operated as a non-electrified line between Tsukinoki and Marumori using KiHa 22 series diesel multiple units borrowed from JNR.

The line was extended south to Fukushima Station on 1 July 1988, completing the full route between Fukushima and Marumori. At the same time, the entire line was electrified using a 20 kV 50 Hz AC overhead supply.

Operations were suspended across the entire line following damage from the 2011 Tōhoku earthquake and tsunami on 11 March 2011, with services gradually restored in stages and full operations resuming on 16 May 2011. All services were again suspended on 12 October 2019 due to damage caused by Typhoon Hagibis; partial service resumed later that month, and full operations between Fukushima and Tsukinoki were restored on 31 October 2020. A further suspension occurred following the 2022 Fukushima earthquake on 16 March 2022, with services progressively reinstated and full operations resuming on 27 June 2022.

== Rolling Stock ==
AB900 series (EMU)
