= Abukuma-dō =

Limestone cave in Fukushima

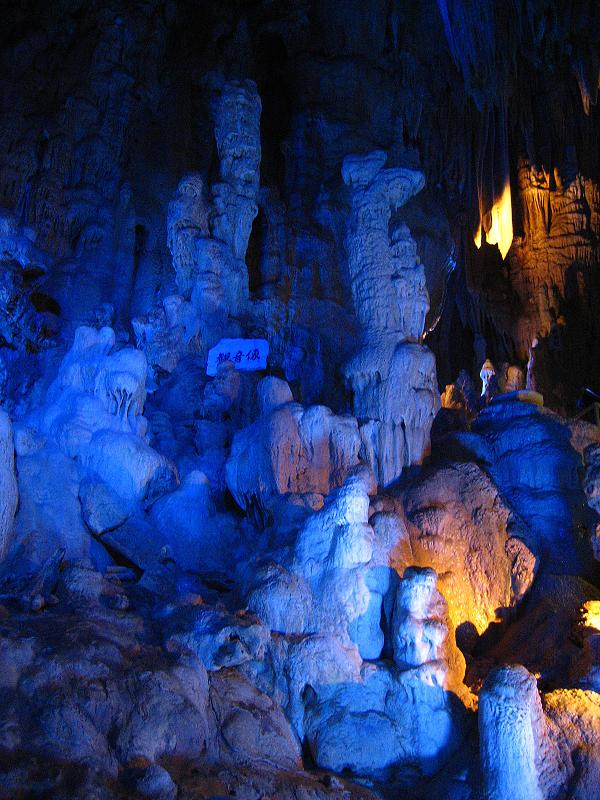
- The Takine Palace
- Interactive map of Abukuma-dō
- Location: Honshū, Japan
- Nearest city: Tamura-shi, Fukushima Prefecture
- Coordinates: 37°20′41″N 140°40′24″E
- Visitors: 10,085,000 (in 1988)
- Website: abukumado.com/en/

Abukuma-dō (あぶくま洞 - Abukuma Cave) is a limestone cave located in Fukushima Prefecture, Japan.The cave was discovered on August 15, 1969, northeast of the city of Tamura and was originally named Kamayama Shonyu-do (釜山鍾乳洞). It was designated a natural heritage of the town on February 7, 1971, and renamed Abukuma-dō on June 1,1973. Visitors can traverse a 600-metre-long path inside the cave as well as a 120-metre-long exploration course to view the stalactites and stalagmites. Each stalactite has taken more than eighty million years to form. Beyond the public areas lie about 2,500 metres of cave that are not open to the public. Nearby Abukuma Cave is the smaller Irimizu Shonyu-do (入水鍾乳洞 - Irimizu Limestone Cave), discovered in 1927. Irimizu Limestone Cave was designated a National Natural Treasure on December 28, 1934. The temperature inside Abukuma-dō is approximately 15 °C and the humidity is above 90%.

== History ==
Abukuma-dō was discovered in September 1969 from the present Busan quarry site in an area called Abukuma Highlands (阿武隈高地), or Harachitai highlands (原地帯), in the middle of a geologic plateau formation of irregular limestone deposits, on the western slope of Mt. Otakine. Since ancient times mining for marble and limestone has been popular in that area. Limestone was also discovered at Abukuma-dō. At the year of Abukuma-dō's discovery mining in that area was suspended, and a limestone outcrop remains to this day.

The initial discovery of the cave entrance is now near the exit of the modern day tourist destination. The cave itself consists of a 12m deep pit, a tunnel running 60m north, and a passage running 15m southwest. In March 1970, an expedition team from Nihon University explored discovered the main cave chamber beyond the previously discovered air hole. In June 1973, the cave was developed for observation and opened to the public.

== Geology ==
From the west slope of Mt. Otakine to the Ogoe district of Tamura city, a limestone layer called the Takine Formation runs about 4 km vertically on the longitude and between 0.5 and 1 km horizontally on the latitude. This limestone was formed by depositing the remains of organisms such as foraminifera on the seabed from the Carboniferous to the Permian about 300 million years ago.

It is estimated that the limestone that started the Abukuma caves was transformed into crystalline limestone about 80 million years ago in the late Cretaceous period. Around this time, the limestone of the Takine Formation, which was still deep underground, underwent contact metamorphism from the intrusive granite and granodiorite, and part of it changed to crystalline limestone (also known as marble).

It is presumed that the limestone layer emerged on the surface of the earth due to the widespread uplift, and the erosion by groundwater began and the cave was formed, probably from the end of the Tertiary to the Quaternary period. Further details of the formation are unclear.

== Within the cave ==
The length of the general tour around the Abukuma Caves is about 600m excluding any other routes not included. About a 150m into the cave there is a route branched for a paid "exploration course" (about 120m total), making the total tour about 720m. The total length of the cave, including routes not open to the public, is approximately 3,300m, which may be further extended depending on future explorations. Various shapes of stalactites have developed in the cave. In addition to the stalagmites and stone pillars, cave shields (flat stalactites in the shape of shield plates) and erosion marks of ground water can also be seen.

The average temperature in the cave is around 14 °C, this temperature does not fluctuate greatly although in 1975 to 1977 after the tourism development, the temperature was seen rise up to 15 to 17 °C in the summer. 15 °C being the lower temperature in the winter. Prior to the cave being discovered the temperature in the summer stood around 14 °C and decreasing to around 0 to 10 °C in the winter. Icicles can be seen in winter near the openings of the caves however the waterways and walls inside do not freeze.

A research study conducted in 2001 revealed that the groundwater flow that springs from the innermost part of the main cave is derived from the groundwater that has permeated from the foot of Mt. Otakine.

=== Names within the cave ===
Various names are given to the most characteristic areas and stalactite structures in the Abukuma caves. Listed below are the names of the different areas and stalactite structures. In addition to these, there are outline information boards, old entrances, routes of branches to exploration courses, emergency access routes, etc. as facilities in the cave. There is also a wine cellar that utilizes the stable environment inside the cave.

- Youkai Tower
- Hakuji Waterfall
- Senshin Pond
- Seseragi no ma
- Sekka no Jurin
- Christmas Tree
- Juhyō
- Rimstone
- Kan'non-zō
- Takine Palace - Large cavity with a ceiling height of about 30m
  - Big Froston
  - Horaana Coral
  - Crystal Curtain
  - Horaana Shield
  - Box Work
- Ryū kyūden - A large cavity next to Takine Palace
  - Mushroom Rock
- Tsuki no Sekai - A place where you can see the main stalactites in the cave

==== Boxwork ====
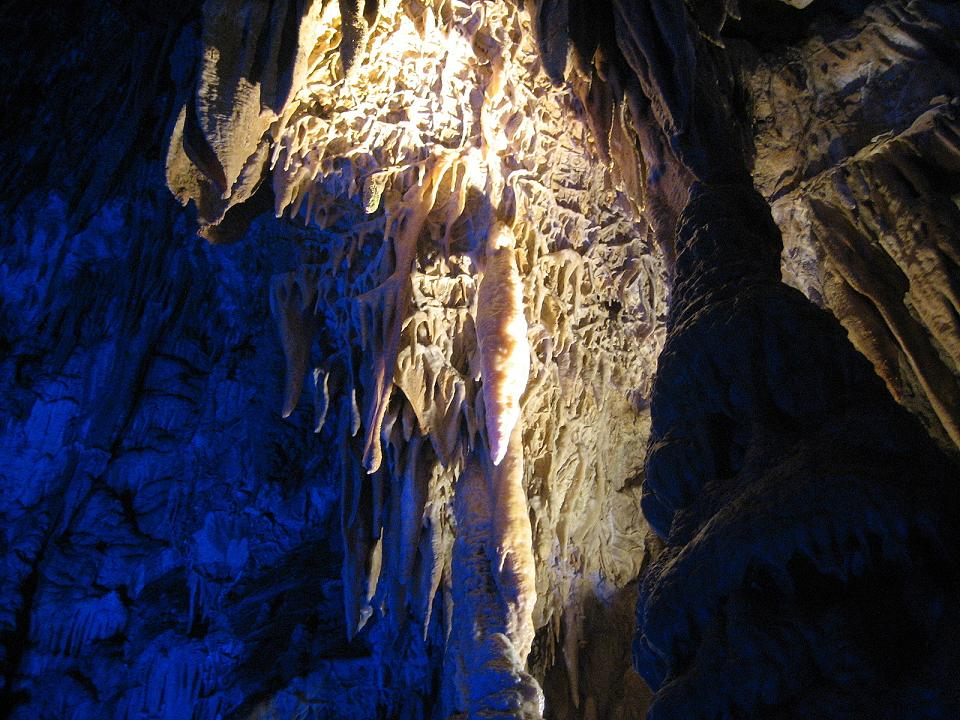
Boxwork inside Abukuma-dō

A notable feature of Abukuma-dō is the existence of boxwork, a rare cave formation composed of thin blades of calcite that project from cave walls and ceilings, forming a honeycomb or box-like pattern. Boxwork can also be found in Shimukugama in Okinawa and Sugawatari-do (氷渡洞 - Ice Cross Cave) in Iwate Prefecture, but because Abukuma-dō is currently the only limestone cave in Japan open to tourists, it is subsequently the only cave in Japan in which boxwork can be seen.

==== Christmas Tree and Silver Frost ====
The Christmas Tree and the Silver Frost are two of the most distinctive Speleothem inside Abukuma-dō. The Christmas Tree is a stalagmite and The Silver Frost meets dripstones on the roof of the cave resulting in an impressive column. Both represent a featured stop along the 600 meter course inside the cave. According to the Abukuma Caves Management Office, The Christmas Tree, at over two metres high, is said to be the largest stalagmite in the East.

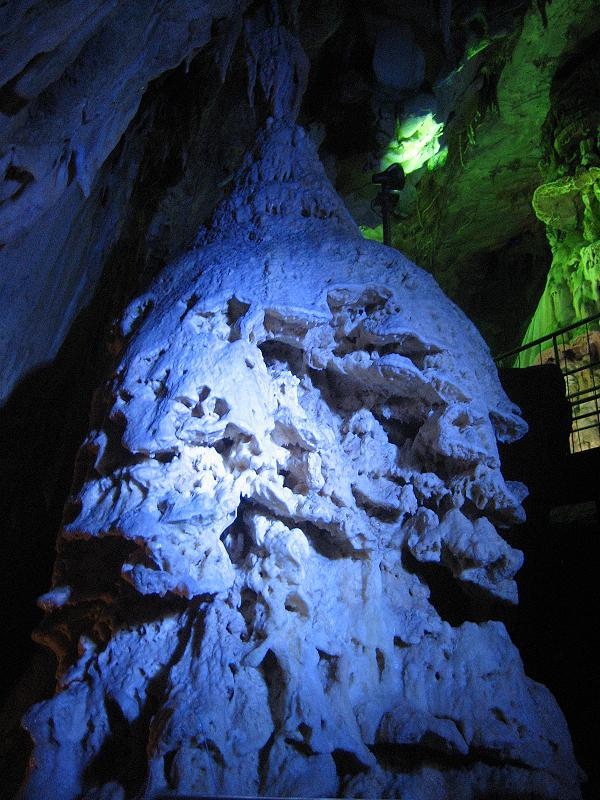
The Silver Frost

=== Biology ===
Many organisms can be observed in the Abukuma Caves. Salamanders often inhabit the waterways. The cave is home to millipedes, pseudoscorpions, springtails, camel crickets, greater horseshoe bats, Japanese lesser horseshoe bats, and tube nosed bats. The Japanese long-eared bat, which is confirmed to be rated as Endangered on the Red List of the Ministry of the Environment, also lives in the cave. The inside of the tourist cave is illuminated for viewing the stalactites and for safety. Lampenflora including bryophytes and algae grow on the cave walls.

== Surrounding Geography ==
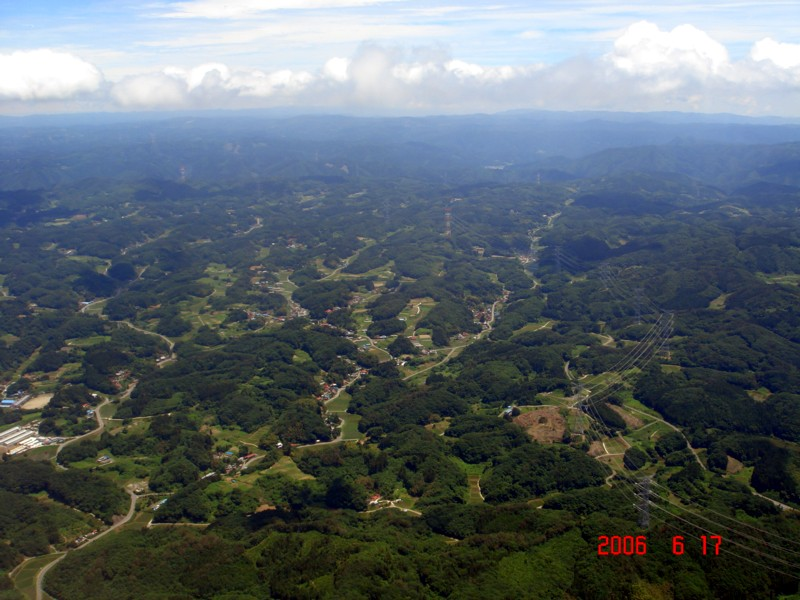
Abukuma Plateau

Limestone dew rocks called pinnacles can be seen everywhere in Sendaidaira, forming a landscape similar to the karst terrain. In addition to the Abukuma Caves, there are depressions and caves such as Dorine and Irimizu Caves also known as Oniana. Inside large sinkholes, woody plants like Quercus crispula and Acer mono grow while bryophytes spread on the forest floor. Acer mono turns red in autumn and is traditional to Sendaidaira along with cherry blossoms in the spring. Red pine dominates most of the vegetation in the Abukuma plateau area but deciduous trees such as zelkova can also be spotted around Sendaidaira. These areas are inhabited by small to medium sized mammals such as wild boars, raccoons and foxes.

=== Oniana ===
A large sinkhole developed at the boundary between the limestone layer and the shale layer with a major axis of 140m, a minor axis of 120m, and a depth of 85m. The side closer to the limestone is a cliff and the shale side has eroded to form a slope. The underground is connected to the Abukuma Caves, and the rainwater that flows in from the Oniana flows out via Abukuma Caves.

In 2004 a door was installed on the Oniana hole to protect the Japanese Hilgendorf's bat that inhabits the Abukuma Cave. Little horseshoe bats inhabit the 70m long horizontal hole of the Oniana.

This Oniana has a legendary rumor. Around 800AD (early Heian period), this region was ruled by a powerful tribe called Ota Onimaru. This powerful tribe encountered conflicts with the imperial court and Sakanoue Tamura Maro, who was the shogun at the time, dispatched the imperial army to them. Ota Onimaru made a castle on Mt. Otakine made of platinum and faced Tamura Maro, however as he got driven further into the sinkhole he took his own life in the end. Ota Onimaru was then buried in a hill located in Sendaidaira but left his name retained in the largest hall of the Oniana sinkhole. The area named "Ota Onimaru Hall" and in that same area is "Ota Onimaru's stool stone". The Ota Onimaru hall is about 100m long and has a ceiling height of 60m or more, and the flowstone can be observed with the largest height difference in Japan reaching up to 45m on the cave wall.

=== Irimizu Caves ===
There is a limestone cave located about 4 km north of the Abukuma Caves (37° 21′ 19.7″ N, 140° 39′ 53.1″ E). The area was designed to be a national natural monument in December 1934, and is under the jurisdiction of an office different than the one that manages the Abukuma Caves. The geological position is similar to the Abukuma Caves. The total length is about 900m, and as the name may suggest, there are numerous waterways located in that cave. Rainwater that flows into a drain called "nekoshakushi" of Sendaidaira flows into the Irimizu Caves. There are three different tour trails, two of them needing preparation to travel through water. With that being said, even without needing preparation for the tour not needing preparations for water in the route this may change with the seasons. The water levels may rise up to the knees for some individuals. After heavy rains this cave cannot be entered. In addition to bats, other organisms inhabit the cave such as salamanders and millipedes.

The temperature of the running water in the Irimizu Caves was 1.8 °C lower than that of the Abukuma Caves at the time of the research survey done in 2001. Some of the tour routes have a depth of a few dozen cm and the tours that required water preparation also require appropriate equipment, one of these routes needing accompaniment by a tour guide if and individual wished to enter.

=== ETC. ===
Sendaidaira has been made as a national recreational area and a prefectural natural park (Abukuma Kogen Chubu Prefectural National Park), and is used for leisure and rest. It is also a place where astronomical observations are popular because it is far from the urban area and is less affected by city light pollution. Near the Abukuma Cave is Hoshinumura Observatory equipped with a reflection telescope having a diameter of 65 cm and a planetarium in the building.

== Facilities and Transportation ==
=== Facility Information ===
- Opening Time: 8:30AM – 5:00PM (March 1 - November 30)
  - From December - February the closing time is 4:30PM
- Holidays: none
- Parking lot: 700 passenger cars, 30 sightseeing buses (free)
- Fees: Adults 1200 yen, junior and high school students 800yen, elementary and younger 600 yen
  - There are group discounts as well as discounts for disabled and others.

=== Transportation Information ===
- Railway: Take a taxi from Kanmata station on the JR Ban-Etsuto Line. The bus has been temporarily taken out.
- Private car: About 15 mins from Ono IC via Ban-etsu Expressway or Abukuma Kogen Road.

== See also ==
- Cave
- National treasures of Japan
