= Marumori Station =

Railway station in Marumori, Miyagi Prefecture, Japan

Marumori Station 丸森駅
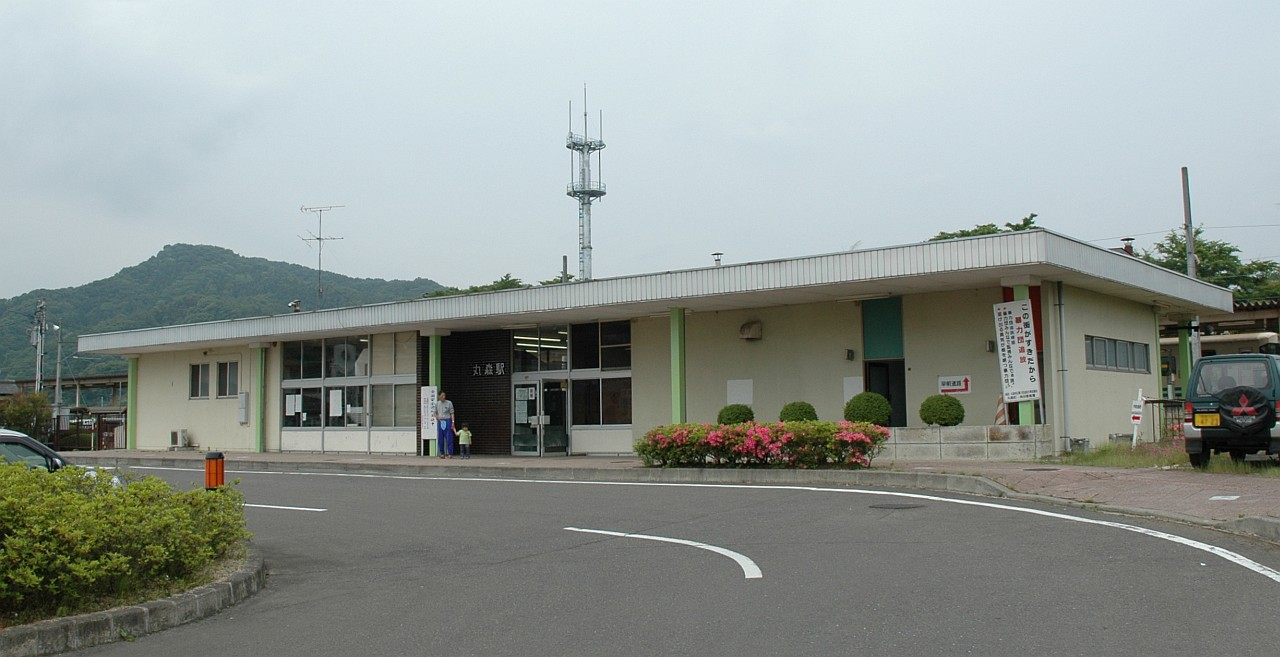
- Marumori Station, June 2007

General information
- Location: Tateyama-Yamada, Marumori-machi, Igu-gun, Miyagi-ken 981-2103; Japan
- Coordinates: 37°55′50.42″N 140°45′42.51″E
- Operator: AbukumaExpress
- Line: ■ Abukuma Express Line
- Distance: 37.5 km from Fukushima
- Platforms: 1 island platform
- Tracks: 2

Other information
- Status: Staffed
- Website: Official website

History
- Opened: April 1, 1968

Passengers
- FY2016: 229
Location
- Location within Miyagi Prefecture Location within Japan

Marumori Station (丸森駅, Marumori eki) is a railway station in the town of Marumori, Miyagi Prefecture, Japan, operated by the third-sector railway operator AbukumaExpress

== Lines ==
Marumori Station is served by the Abukuma Express Line, and is located 37.5 rail kilometres from the official starting point of the line at Fukushima.

== Station layout ==
The station has a single island platform connected to the station building by a level crossing. The station is staffed.

== Adjacent stations ==
«	Service	»
Abukuma Express Line
Rapid: Does not stop at this station
Abukuma	Local	Kita-Marumori

== History ==
Marumori Station opened on April 1, 1968, as a station on the Japan National Railways (JNR). It became part of the Abukawa Express network from July 1, 1986.

== Surrounding area ==
The station is located in a rural area over one kilometre north of the center of Marumori Town.

- National Route 113

== See also ==
- List of railway stations in Japan
