= Abukuma Kyuko =

Railway company in Fukushima, Japan

Abukuma Express Co., Ltd.

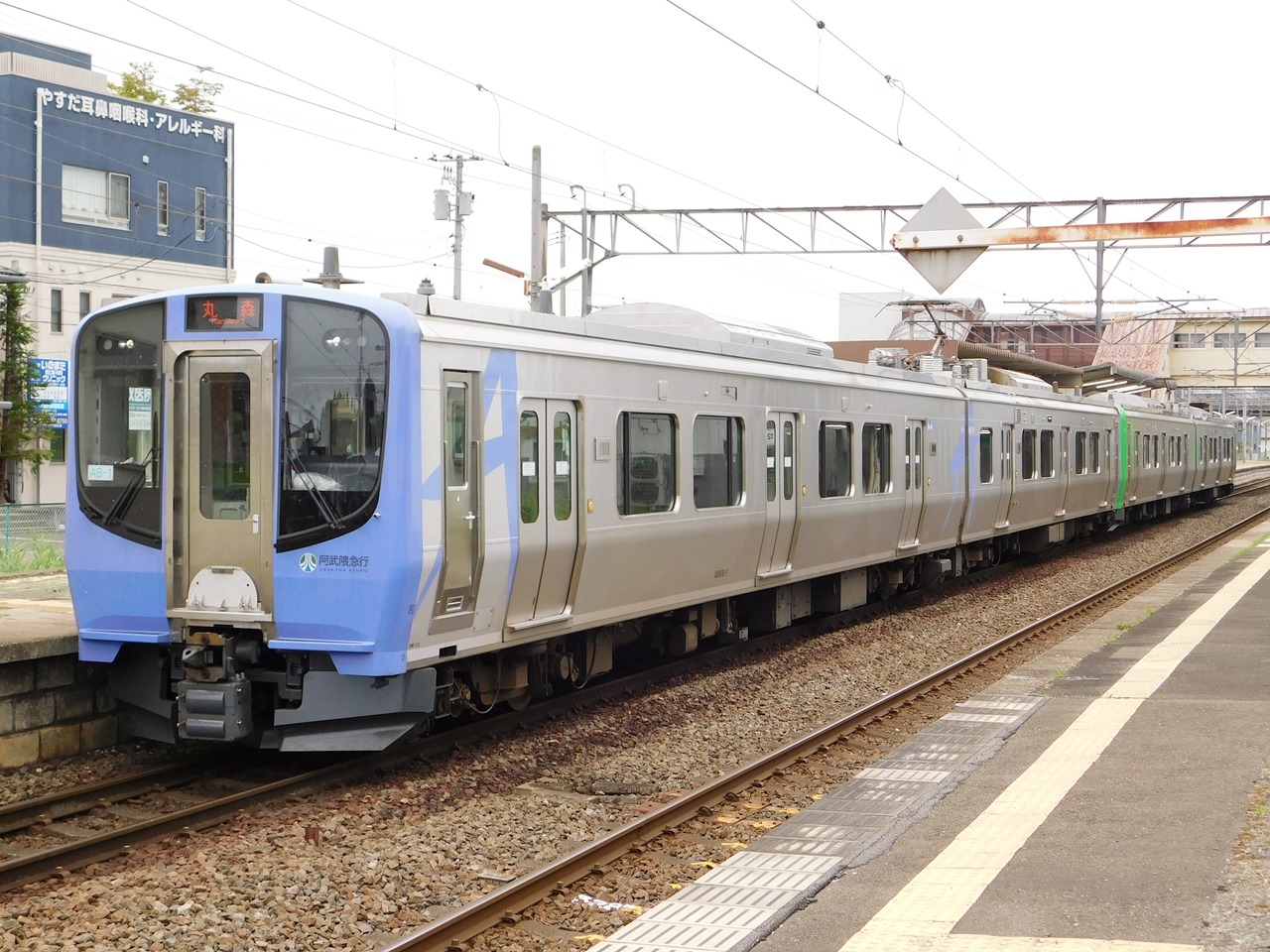
- AB900 series train on the Abukuma Express Line at Tsukinoki Station
- Native name: 阿武隈急行株式会社
- Company type: Third sector
- Industry: Rail transport
- Founded: 5 April 1984; 42 years ago
- Headquarters: Date, Fukushima, Japan
- Area served: Northern Fukushima and southwest Miyagi prefectures
- Services: Abukuma Express Line
- Website: abukyu.co.jp

Abukuma Express Co., Ltd. (Japanese: 阿武隈急行株式会社, Hepburn: Abukuma Kyūkō Kabushiki-gaisha) is a third-sector railway company headquartered in Date, Fukushima, Japan. Its sole service is the Abukuma Express Line.

== History ==
Abukuma Express was founded on 5 April 1984 as a third-sector railway operator to take over operations of Japanese National Railways' Marumori Line, which ran 17.4 kilometres (10.8 mi) between Marumori Station and Tsukinoki Station. An application for a railway operating license covering the full route between Fukushima and Marumori was submitted on 24 December 1984. The license was granted on 27 February 1985, followed by approval of construction works on 2 March 1985, allowing electrification of the existing section and the resumption of construction on previously unfinished segments.

The Marumori Line was provisionally reopened as the Abukuma Express Line on 1 July 1986, following its transfer from Japanese National Railways to Abukuma Express, with services initially operated as a non-electrified line between Tsukinoki and Marumori.

The line was extended south to Fukushima Station on 1 July 1988, completing the full route between Fukushima and Marumori and the entire line was electrified using 20 kV 50 Hz AC overhead supply.

Operations were suspended across the entire line following damage from the 2011 Tōhoku earthquake and tsunami on 11 March 2011, with services gradually restored in stages and full operations resuming on 16 May 2011. All services were again suspended on 12 October 2019 due to damage caused by Typhoon Hagibis; partial service resumed later that month, and full operations between Fukushima and Tsukinoki were restored on 31 October 2020. Another suspension occurred following the 2022 Fukushima earthquake on 16 March 2022, with services progressively reinstated and full operations resuming on 27 June 2022.

== Operations ==
Abukuma Express operates the Abukuma Express Line, which runs 54.9 kilometres (34.1 mi) from Fukushima Station in the south to Tsukinoki Station in the north.

== Rolling stock ==
=== Current vehicles ===
- 8100 series — two-car electric multiple units introduced in 1988 consisting of AM8100 and AT8100 cars. As of July 2024, two sets were in service.
- AB900 series — two-car electric multiple units introduced in July 2019 to replace the aging 8100 series, with plans to standardize the fleet on this model. As of July 2024, seven sets are in service.
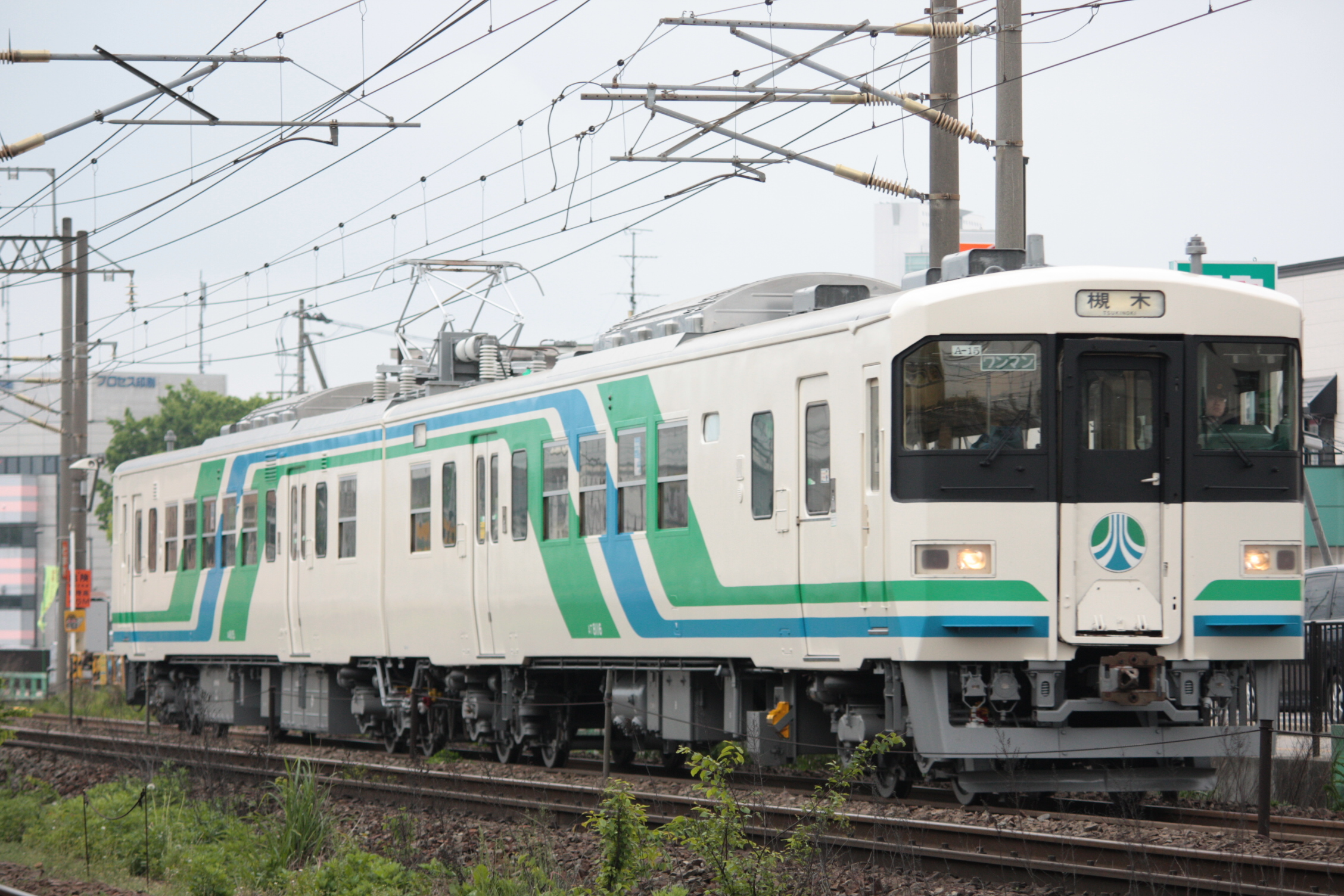
8100 series

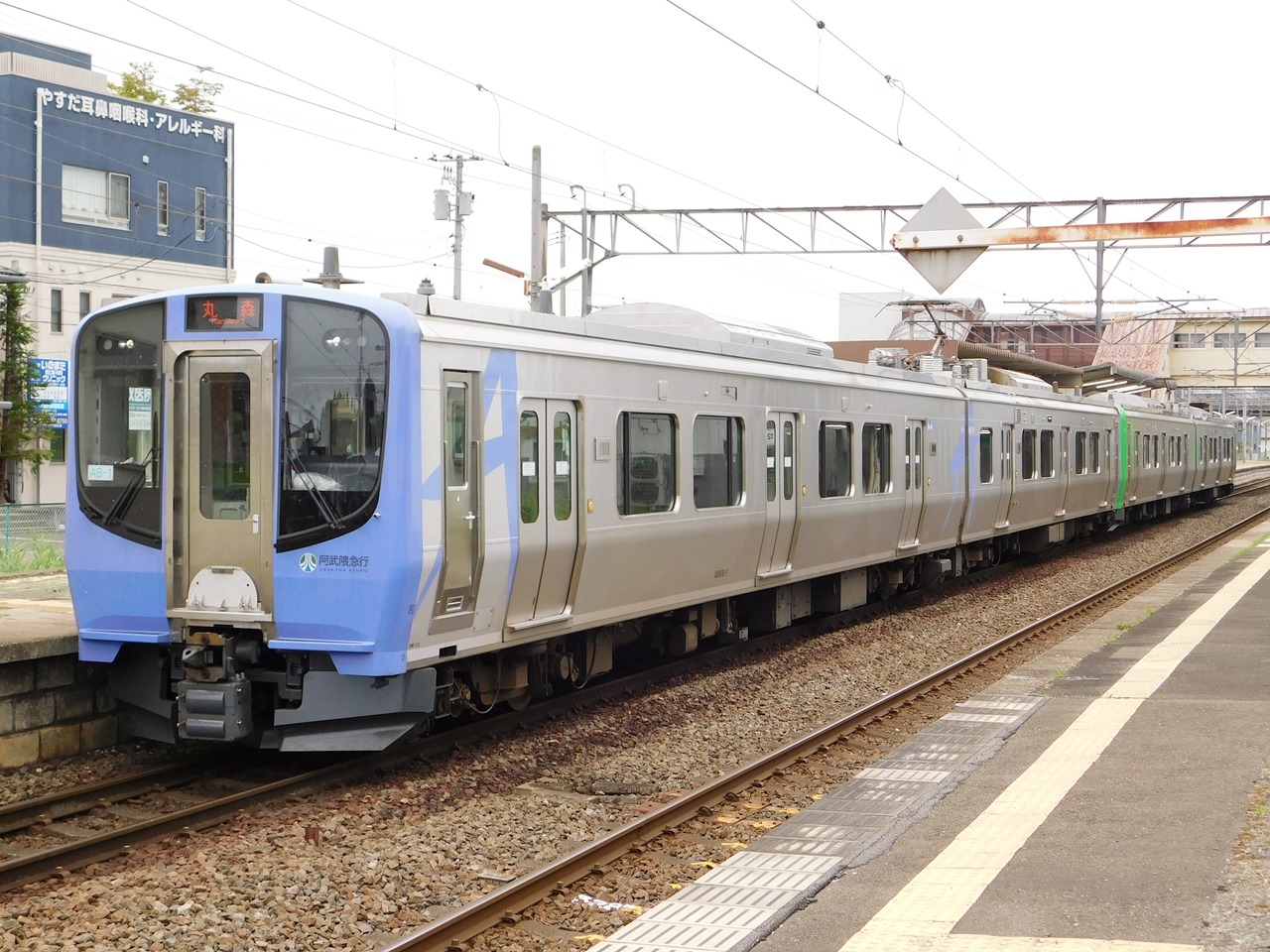
AB900 series

=== Past vehicles ===
- KiHa 22 series — Five diesel railcars borrowed from JNR for the provisional opening of the line in 1986. Following the full opening of the line in 1988 and the introduction of the 8100 series electric multiple units, these vehicles were returned to JR East, JNR’s successor.
- A417 series — A single three-car 417 series train acquired from JR East used between 30 October 2008 and 26 March 2016. It was used primarily on selected weekday morning and evening services.
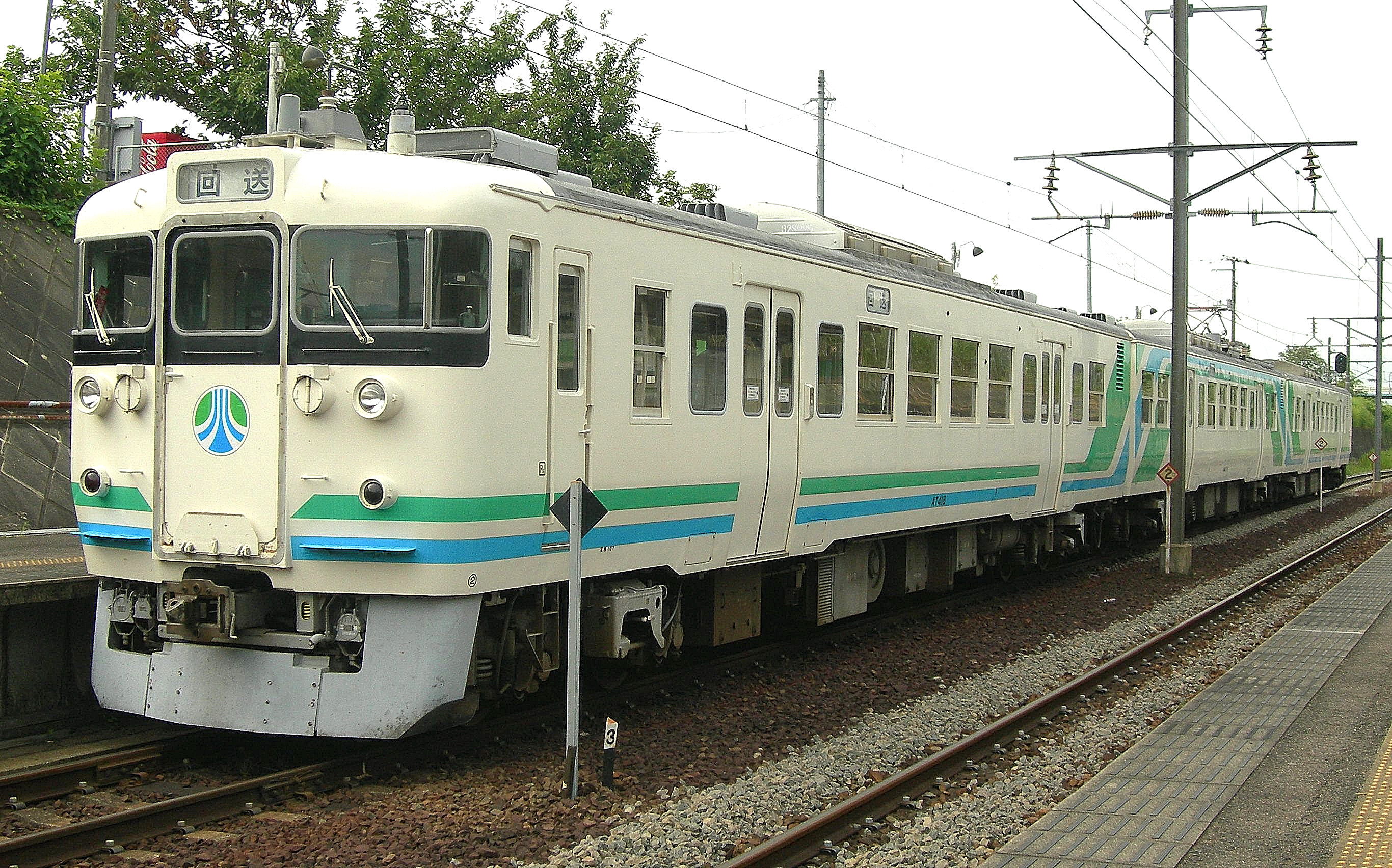
A417 series

== Ownership ==
The shareholders of Abukuma Express are primarily the local and prefectural governments along its route. Its only private-sector shareholder is Fukushima Transportation, which holds a 20% stake and shares a platform with Abukuma Express at Fukushima Station.

Shareholder	Number of shares	Percentage of shares
Fukushima Prefecture	8,400	28.0%
Miyagi Prefecture	7,680	25.6%
Fukushima Transportation	6,000	20.0%
Fukushima City	1,836	6.1%
Date	1,568	5.2%
Kakuda	1,504	5.0%
Marumori	1,062	3.6%
Sendai	398	1.3%
Shibata	221	0.7%
Natori	221	0.7%
Iwanuma	221	0.7%
Shiroishi	150	0.5%
Nine unnamed shareholders	739	2.5%

== See also ==
- List of railway companies in Japan
