= ALFLEX =

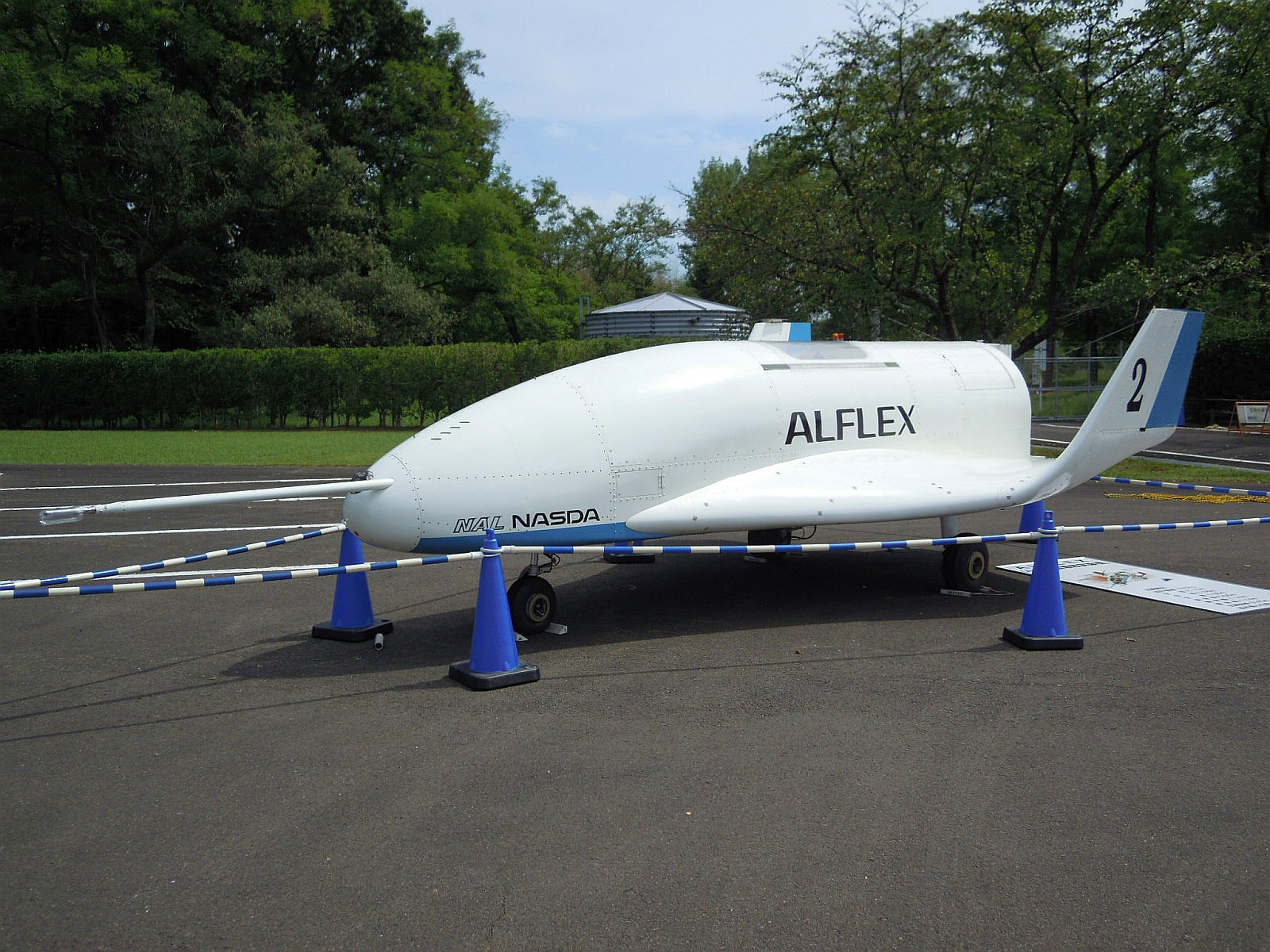
An exhibit of ALFLEX at the Kakuda Space Center

ALFLEX (Automatic Landing Flight EXperiment) was an experimental unmanned aircraft created by NASDA and NAL, the predecessors of JAXA, in 1996. It was built as a successor to HYFLEX as part of the HOPE program.

ALFLEX was built to establish the basic technology of automatic landing. The design featured a streamlined metal hull, delta planiform wings, and large winglets. Despite being a project of Japanese aerospace agencies, ALFLEX never left the atmosphere. Instead, it was carried up to a high altitude by a helicopter, then released to automatically glide down to the designated landing site, navigating by means of onboard computers. ALFLEX completed thirteen drop tests from July to August 1996, all of which were successful.

== Specifications (ALFLEX) ==
- Length (without pitot boom): 6.10 m
- Wingspan: 3.78 m
- Height (without gear): 1.35 m

== See also ==
- HOPE-X
- HYFLEX
- OREX
