= Oka Station =

Railway station in Kakuda, Miyagi Prefecture, Japan

Oka Station 岡駅
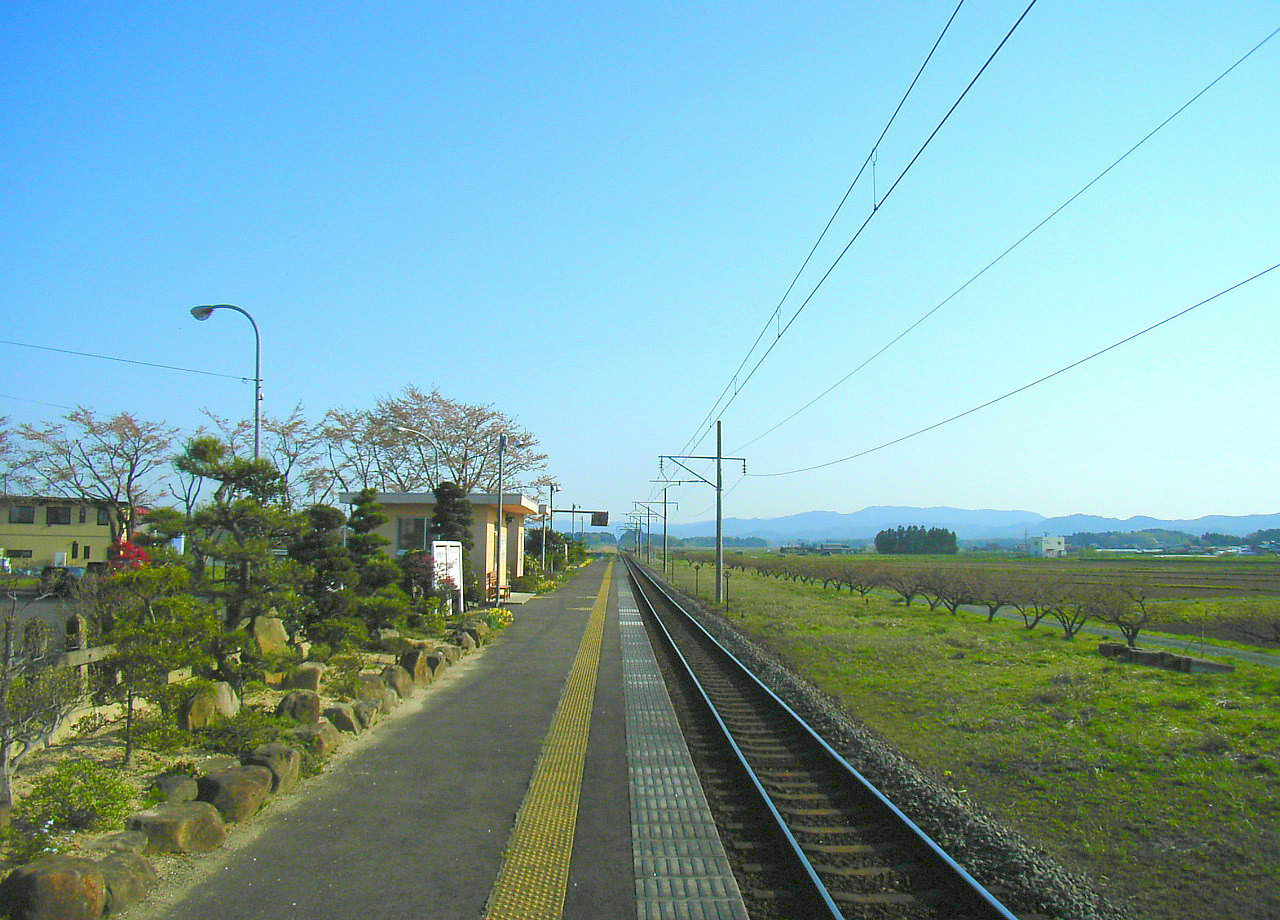
- Oka Station, April 2005

General information
- Location: Oka-Shiroiwa, Kakuda-shi, Miyagi-ken 981-1524; Japan
- Coordinates: 38°01′9.02″N 140°46′49.99″E
- Operator: AbukumaExpress
- Line: ■ Abukuma Express Line
- Distance: 47.7 km from Fukushima
- Platforms: 1 side platform
- Tracks: 1

Other information
- Status: Unstaffed
- Website: Official website

History
- Opened: April 1, 1968
Location
- Location within Japan

Oka Station (岡駅, Oka eki) is a railway station on the AbukumaExpress in the city of Kakuda, Miyagi Prefecture, Japan.

== Lines ==
Oka Station is served by the Abukuma Express Line, and is located 47.7 rail kilometers from the official starting point of the line at Fukushima.

== Station layout ==
Oka Station has one side platform serving a single bi-directional track. The station is unattended.

== Adjacent stations ==
| « | Service | » |
Abukuma Express Line
Rapid: Does not stop at this station
| Yokokura | Local | Higashi-Funaoka |

== History ==
Oka Station opened on April 1, 1968, as a station on the Japanese National Railways (JNR). The station became a station on the Abukuma Express on July 1, 1986.

== Surrounding area ==
- Kakuda Space Center

== See also ==
- List of railway stations in Japan
