= Yanase-ura Site =

Japanese archeological site

Yanaseura ruins
- 梁瀬浦遺跡 (Japanese)
- Yanaseura ruins Yanase-ura Site (Japan)
- 38°00′26″N 140°45′17″E
- Periods: Jōmon to Yayoi period
- Location: Kakuda, Miyagi, Japan
- Region: Tōhoku region

Site notes
- Elevation: 10 m (33 ft)
- Public access: Yes (no facilities)

Yanase-ura site (梁瀬浦遺跡, Yanase-ura iseki) is an archaeological site with the ruins of a Jōmon period settlement located in what is now the city of Kakuda, Miyagi Prefecture in the Tōhoku region of northern Japan. The site received protection by the central government as a National Historic Site in 1977.

== Overview ==
The site is located on a slight elevation located in the western Kakuda Basin in the lower reaches of the Abukuma River, north of the urban center of Kakuda. It is composed of the ruins of a settlement with a thick relic inclusion layer measuring about 100 meters in length and about 50 meters in width, with artifacts located in soil levels up to 2 meters in depth. From pollen analysis and from the clay pottery and figurines, stoneware and animal bones uncovered, the site is estimated to date from the mid-Jōmon through the early Yayoi period. Also from pollen analysis, it appears that this was a lakeshore settlement in the mid-Jōmon period, but the lake gradually became a swamp by end of the Jōmon period. The foundations of numerous pit dwellings from the late Jōmon period and graves from the middle and late Jōmon period were uncovered during archaeological excavations from 1975-76. Eight more excavations have been carried out since 1982

The site was backfilled after excavation, and there is now nothing to see except for a grassy field with a stone market and plaque. It is located about 40 minutes on foot from Yokokura Station on the Abukuma Express.

== See also ==
- List of Historic Sites of Japan (Miyagi)
