= HYFLEX =

Japanese prototype of 1996 for testing atmospheric reentry

- Operator: NASDA
- Website: At JAXA.jp
- Apogee: 110 km (68 mi)

Spacecraft properties
- Manufacturer: Mitsubishi Heavy Industries
- Launch mass: 1,054 kg (2,324 lb)
- Dimensions: Length:4.40 m (14.4 ft); Span:1.36 m (4 ft 6 in); Height:1.04 m (3 ft 5 in)

Start of mission
- Launch date: February 11, 1996
- Rocket: J-I
- Launch site: LA-N, Tanegashima Space Center

End of mission
- Disposal: splashed down recovery failed
- Landing date: February 11, 1996
- Landing site: Pacific Ocean near Chichi-jima

HYFLEX (Hypersonic Flight Experiment) was a National Space Development Agency of Japan reentry demonstrator prototype which was launched in 1996 on the only flight of the J-I launcher. It was a successor of OREX and was a precursor for the Japanese space shuttle HOPE-X.

HYFLEX tested the carbon-carbon heat shielding tiles that were intended to be used on HOPE, as well as having the same body shaping in order to gather data on hypersonic lifting. HYFLEX flew in space at 110 kilometers (68 mi) altitude and succeeded in re-entry, but sank in the Pacific after splashdown before it could be recovered.

== Overview ==
HYFLEX was an uncrewed lifting body space plane for gaining technological prowess in the design, production, and flight of hypersonic crafts, as well as technology validation of atmospheric reentry. The experimental vehicle was covered in carbon–carbon, ceramic tiles, and flexible thermal insulation, which were materials that was to be used for HOPE.

Launched on 11 February 1996 (UTC) from Tanegashima Space Center by a J-I rocket, separation from the rocket was conducted at an altitude of 110 km (68 mi), speed of approximately 3.8 km/s. Attitude control was performed by gas thrusters and aerodynamic rudders. During its descent the craft glided in a right turn circling the island of Chichijima in the Ogasawara Archipelago. HYFLEX had various sensors attached to each parts, and succeeded in gaining data on surface aerodynamic heating and pressure. The craft splashed down in the waters northeast of Chichijima with parachutes, however the floats and riser broke off while floating and recovery was abandoned. HYFLEX was succeeded by ALFLEX.

== See also ==
- 1996 in spaceflight
- Intermediate eXperimental Vehicle
- RLV-TD Hypersonic Flight Experiment (India)
