= OREX =

Japanese re-entry demonstrator spaceship

Ryusei
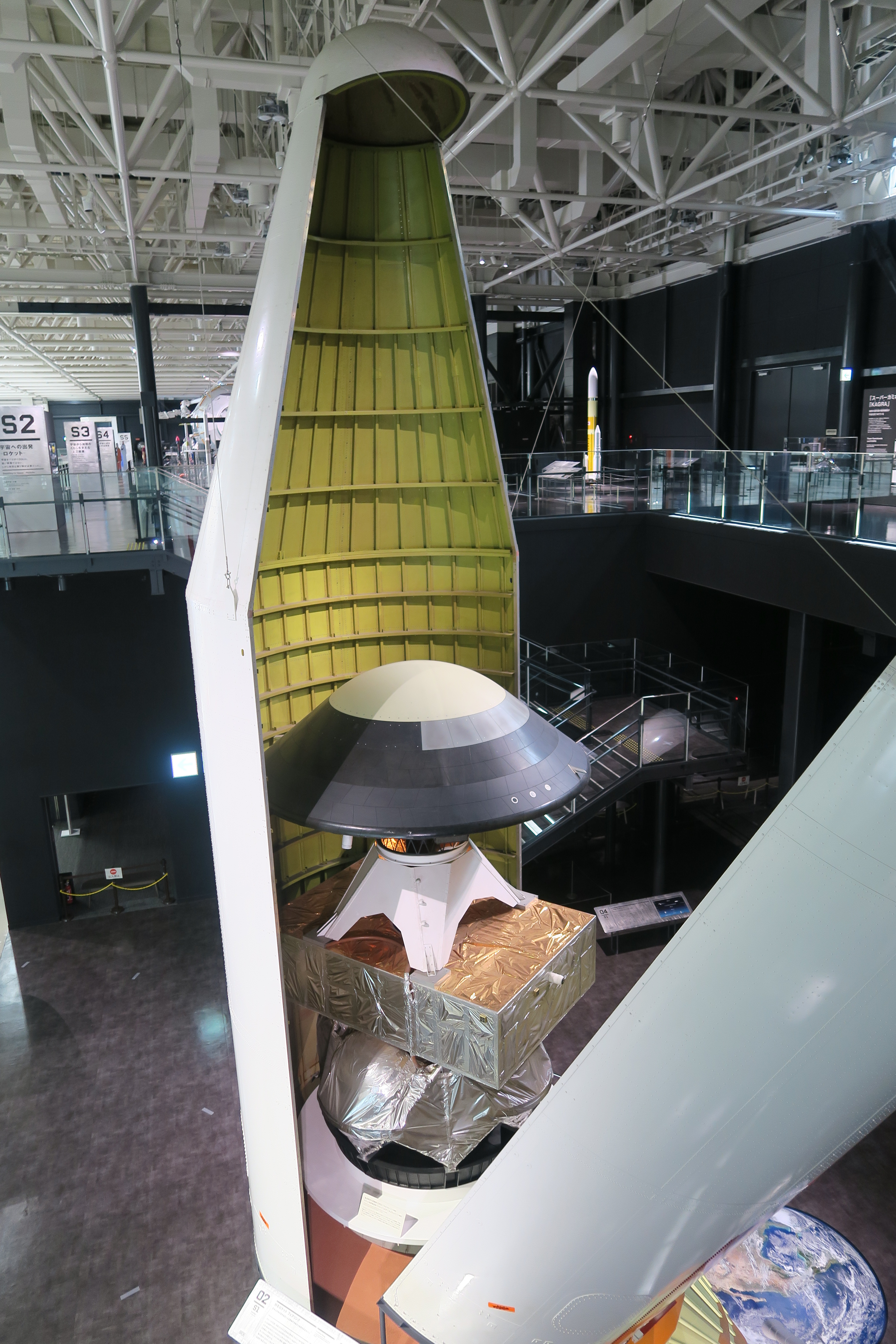
- 1:1 scale model of OREX and the Vehicle Evaluation Payload within the H-II fairing, at the Kakamigahara Air and Space Museum
- Mission type: Technology
- Operator: NASDA
- COSPAR ID: 1994-007A
- SATCAT no.: 22978
- Website: www.jaxa.jp/projects/rockets/orex/index_e.html
- Mission duration: 2 hours

Spacecraft properties
- Manufacturer: NASDA
- Launch mass: 865 kilograms (1,907 lb)
- Landing mass: 761 kilograms (1,678 lb)

Start of mission
- Launch date: 3 February 1994, 22:20 UTC
- Rocket: H-II
- Launch site: Tanegashima Yoshinobu 1

End of mission
- Landing date: 4 February 1994, 00:30 UTC
- Landing site: Pacific Ocean

Orbital parameters
- Reference system: Geocentric
- Regime: Low Earth
- Perigee altitude: 448 kilometres (278 mi)
- Apogee altitude: 458 kilometres (285 mi)
- Inclination: 30.5 degrees
- Period: 93.64 minutes
- Epoch: 3 February 1994

OREX (Orbital Re-entry Experiment) was a NASDA re-entry demonstrator prototype which was launched in 1994 on the H-II launcher; the satellite was renamed Ryūsei (りゅうせい, Shooting star). It was a precursor for the Japanese space shuttle HOPE.

OREX tested various communications systems, heating profiles and heat shielding components for HOPE.

== See also ==
- ALFLEX
- HOPE-X
- HYFLEX
