= Fuji (spacecraft) =

Japanese proposed crewed spacecraft

Fuji Standard System (Provided by JAXA)

Fuji (ふじ) was a crewed space capsule proposed by Japan's National Space Development Agency (NASDA) Advanced mission Research center in December 2001. The Fuji design was ultimately not adopted.

== Background ==
Japanese human spaceflight prior to 2001 had depended on the US Space Shuttle program, and independent development of spacecraft was not adopted as a short to mid-term goal. Instead, NASDA chose to recommend the use of winged reusable launch systems such as the US Space Shuttle and HOPE.

However, after the Japanese government reorganized their space exploration efforts under the Japan Aerospace Exploration Agency (JAXA), Fuji was proposed as a candidate for space missions. The Space Shuttle Columbia disaster in 2003 also raised questions about the safety of reusable systems, and JAXA felt that the Fuji design, relying on an expendable capsule, would be possible to develop in relatively short span of eight years.

== Design ==
The proposed Fuji design was a modular spacecraft (similar to the Gemini, Apollo and Soyuz spacecraft), with various configurations filling different roles.

=== Minimum System ===
The Minimum System configuration of Fuji was essentially just a reentry capsule with a human spaceflight endurance of 24 hours. It was scheduled for development at the early stage of the overall project. This minimum system was called the Core Module (CM), and was to be a cone-shaped module with a diameter of 3.7m, gross weight of 3 tonnes or less, and room for a crew of three. It was to have thrusters for attitude control and a rocket engine capable of producing a small amount of thrust. The targeted manufacturing cost was to be about ¥800 million each.

=== Standard System ===
The Standard System was designed to be capable of one month long flights and flights into lunar orbit. This system was to consist of the minimum system and two additional modules, an Expansion Module (EM) and a Propulsion Module (PM). The EM was envisioned as a living space for long-term space flights, roughly similar in purpose to the Soyuz spacecraft's Orbital Module (OM). The PM had rocket engines to facilitate orbital adjustments, and a solar cell paddle for production of electricity.

=== Economy System ===
The design of the Economy System sought to lower the cost of space travel, and was based on the Minimum System. This system was to be a low cost version of the CM, capable of carrying a pilot and four passengers.

=== Other modules ===
Additional modules were planned, including a Space Laboratory Module equipped with a heat radiation mechanism, a Robotic arm module, and an inflatable Simple Life Support Module.

== Features ==
The Fuji spacecraft was designed to ensure safety by adopting common existing technologies such as escape rockets and ablative heat shields.

After reentry, the Fuji capsule was to use a parafoil and an automatic guidance system based GPS technology for controlled descent and landing.

An open architecture method was used in development of Fuji to control costs, promote technological development, and to expand the potential market. In particular, the developers disclosed information in the machine/electrical/thermal interface between systems, did not restrict the use of this interface, and provided the test criterion of systems.

In addition, Fuji was not to be limited to the H-IIA rocket system for launching.

== Advanced Concepts ==
A variety of purposes were envisioned for the Fuji system, including uses for space tourism, flights to space stations, and flights to the Moon or asteroids.

== See also ==
- H-IIA
- H-II Orbiting Plane (HOPE)
- H-II Transfer Vehicle (proposed human-rated variant)
- Soyuz spacecraft
