= Origins of the International Space Station =

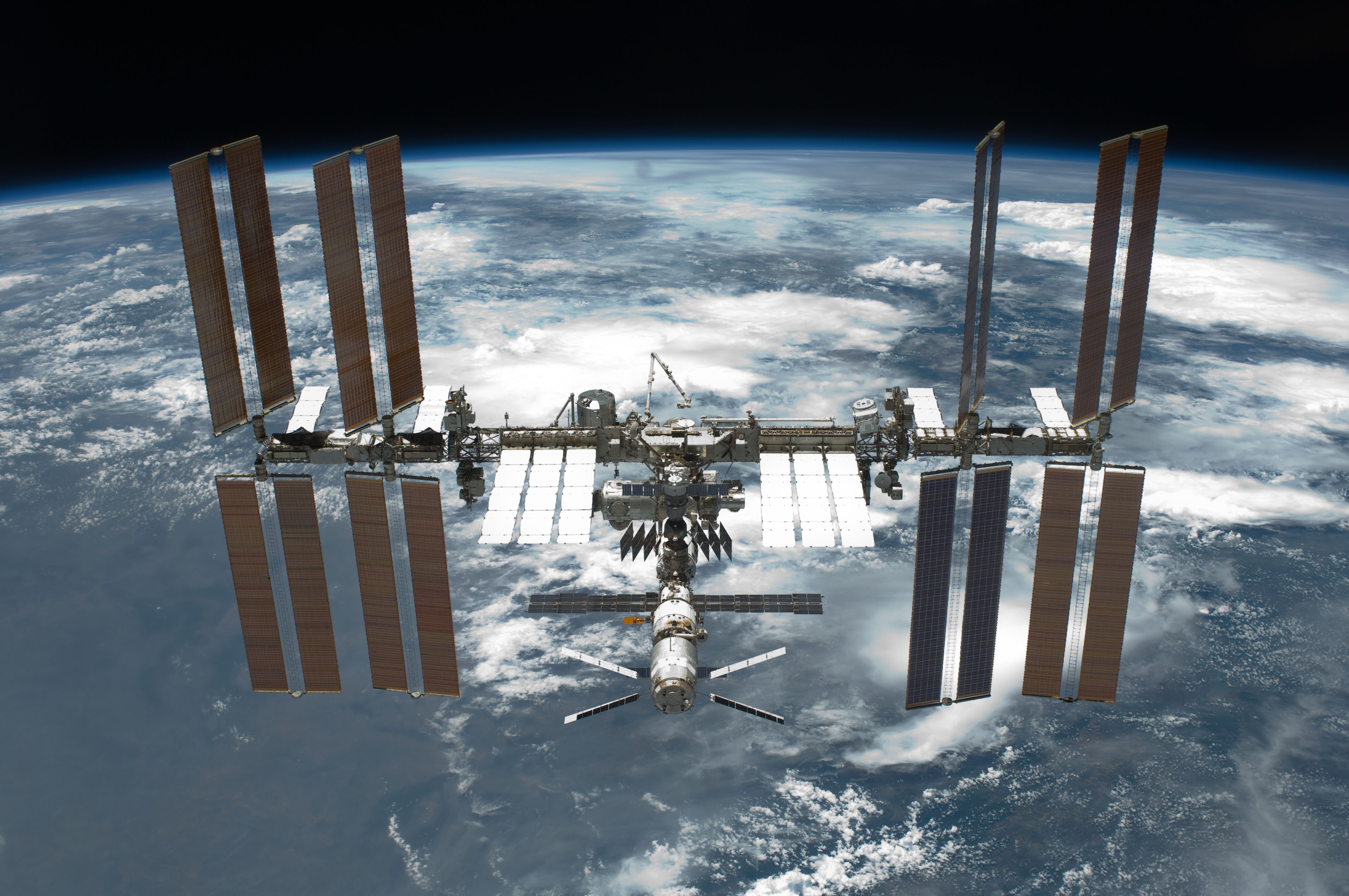
International Space Station in 2011, as seen from STS-134

The International Space Station programme represents a combination of three national space station projects: the Russian/Soviet Mir-2, NASA's Space Station Freedom including the Japanese Kibō laboratory, and the European Columbus space stations. Canadian robotics supplement these projects.

In the early 1980s, NASA planned to launch a modular space station called Freedom as a counterpart to the Soviet Salyut and Mir space stations. In 1984 the ESA was invited to participate in Space Station Freedom, and the ESA approved the Columbus laboratory by 1987. The Japanese Experiment Module (JEM), or Kibō, was announced in 1985, as part of the Freedom space station in response to a NASA request in 1982.

In early 1985, science ministers from the European Space Agency (ESA) countries approved the Columbus programme, the most ambitious effort in space undertaken by that organisation at the time. The plan spearheaded by Germany and Italy included a module which would be attached to Freedom, and with the capability to evolve into a full-fledged European orbital outpost before the end of the century. The space station was also going to tie the emerging European and Japanese national space programmes closer to the US-led project, thereby preventing those nations from becoming major, independent competitors too.

In September 1993, American Vice-President Al Gore and Russian Prime Minister Viktor Chernomyrdin announced plans for a new space station, which eventually became the International Space Station. They also agreed, in preparation for this new project, that the United States would be involved in the Mir programme, including American Shuttles docking, in the Shuttle–Mir Programme.

== Mir-2 ==
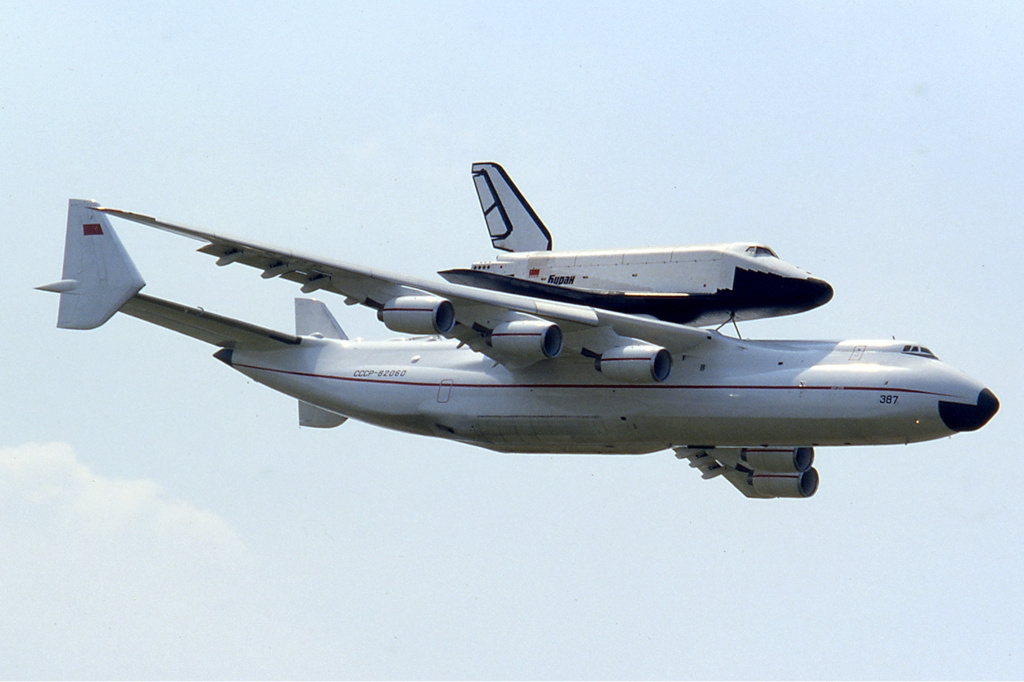
The Soviet Buran spacecraft would have carried modules up to 30 tons to MIR-2. 80–100 ton modules could have used the Energia rocket without the orbiter. They are shown here at the 1989 Paris Air Show

The Russian Orbital Segment (ROS or RS) is the eleventh Soviet-Russian space station. Mir ("Peace") and the ISS are successors to the Salyut ("Fireworks") and Almaz ("Diamond") stations. The first MIR-2 module was launched in 1986 by an Energia heavy-lift expendable launch system. The Energia's core stage and boosters worked properly, however the Polyus spacecraft fired its engines to insert itself into orbit whilst in an incorrect orientation due to a programming error, and re-entered the atmosphere. The planned station changed several times, but Zvezda was always the service module, containing the station's critical systems such as life support. The station would have used the Buran spaceplane and Proton rockets to lift new modules into orbit. The spaceframe of Zvezda, also called DOS-8 serial number 128, was completed in February 1985 and major internal equipment was installed by October 1986.

The Polyus module or spacecraft would have served as the FGB, a foundation which provides propulsion and guidance, but it lacks life support. Polyus was a satellite interceptor/destroyer, carrying a 1 megawatt carbon dioxide laser. The module had a length of almost 37 metres (121 ft) and a diameter of 4.1 metres (13 ft), with a mass of nearly 80 t, and included two principal sections, the smallest, the functional service block (FGB), and the largest, the aim module.

In 1983, the design was changed and the station would consist of Zvezda, followed by several 90-tonne modules and a truss structure similar to the current station. The draft was approved by NPO Energia Chief Semenov on 14 December 1987 and announced to the press as 'Mir-2' in January 1988. This station would be visited by the Soviet Buran, but mainly resupplied by Progress-M2 spacecraft. Orbital assembly of the station was expected to begin in 1993. In 1993 with the collapse of the Soviet Union, a redesigned smaller Mir-2 was to be built whilst attached to Mir, just as OPSEK is being assembled whilst attached to the ISS.

== Freedom ==
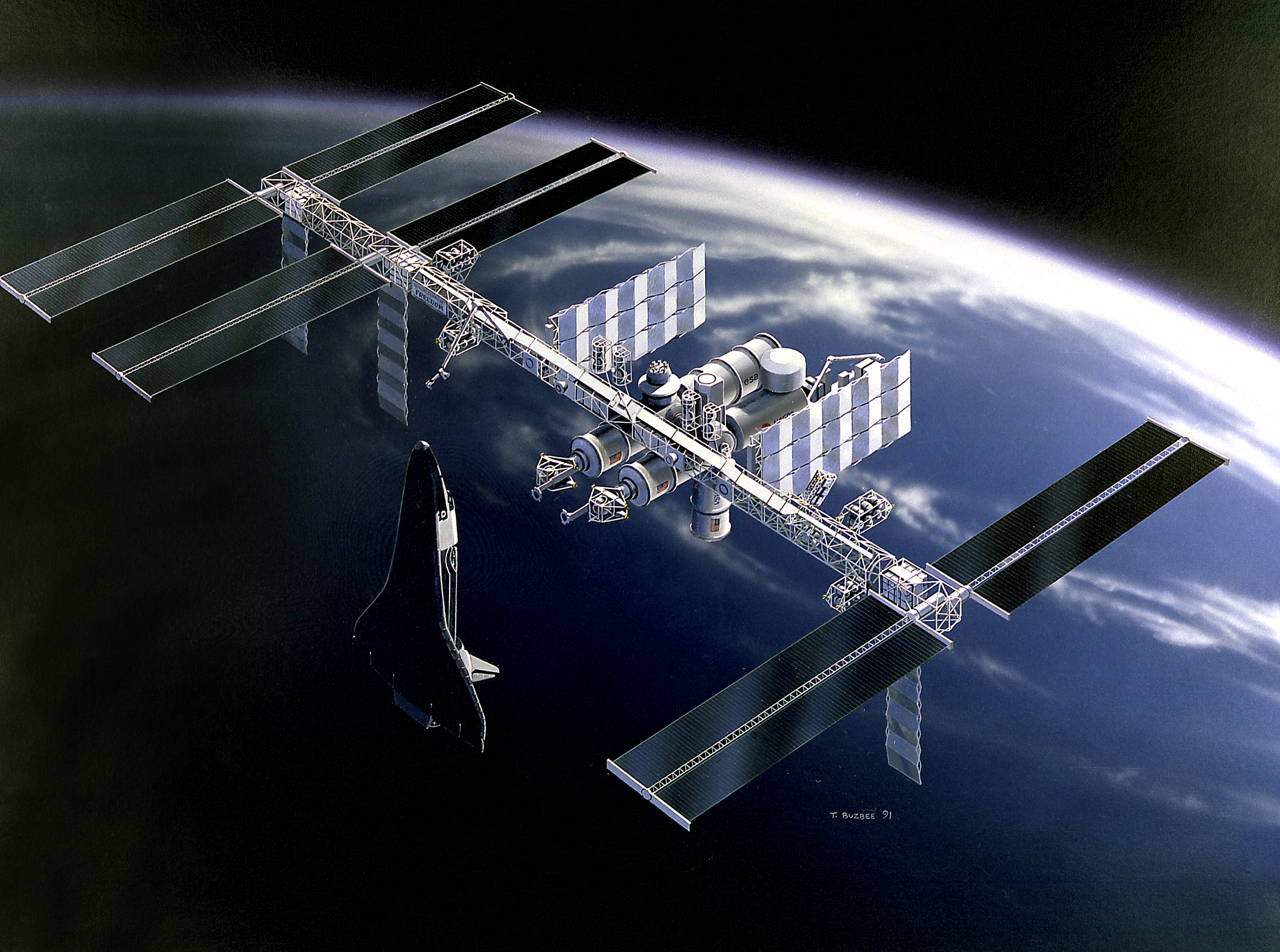
Space Station Freedom

Approved by then-president Ronald Reagan and announced in the 1984 State of the Union Address, "We can follow our dreams to distant stars, living and working in space for peaceful economic and scientific gain", the proposed Freedom changed considerably.

NASA's first cost assessment in 1987 revealed the "Dual Keel" Station would cost $14.5 billion. This caused a political uproar in Congress, and NASA and Reagan Administration officials reached a compromise in March 1987 which allowed the agency to proceed with a cheaper $12.2-billion Phase One Station that could be completed after 10 or 11 Shuttle assembly flights. This design initially omitted the $3.4-billion 'Dual Keel' structure and half of the power generators. The new Space Station configuration was named Freedom by Reagan in June 1988. Originally, Freedom would have carried two 37.5 kW solar arrays. However, Congress quickly insisted on adding two more arrays for scientific users. The Space Station programme was plagued by conflicts during the entire 1984–1987 definition phase. In 1987, the Department of Defense (DoD) briefly demanded to have full access to the Station for military research, despite strong objections from NASA and international partners. Besides the expected furore from the international partners, the DoD position sparked a shouting match between Defense Secretary Caspar Weinberger and powerful members of Congress that extended right up to the final Fiscal 1988 budget authorisation in July 1987. Reagan wanted to invite other NATO countries to participate in the US-led project, since the Soviet Union had been launching international crews to their Salyut space stations since 1971. At one point, then-anonymous disgruntled NASA employees calling themselves "Center for Strategic Space Studies" suggested that instead of building Freedom, NASA should take the back-up Skylab from display in the National Air and Space Museum in Washington and launch that.

An agreement signed in September 1988 allocated 97% of the US lab resources to NASA while the Canadian CSA would receive 3% in return for its contribution. Europe and Japan would retain 51% of their own laboratory modules. Six Americans and two international astronauts would be permanently based on Space Station Freedom. Several NASA Space Shuttle missions in the 1980s and early 1990s included spacewalks to demonstrate and test space station construction techniques.

=== Kibō ===
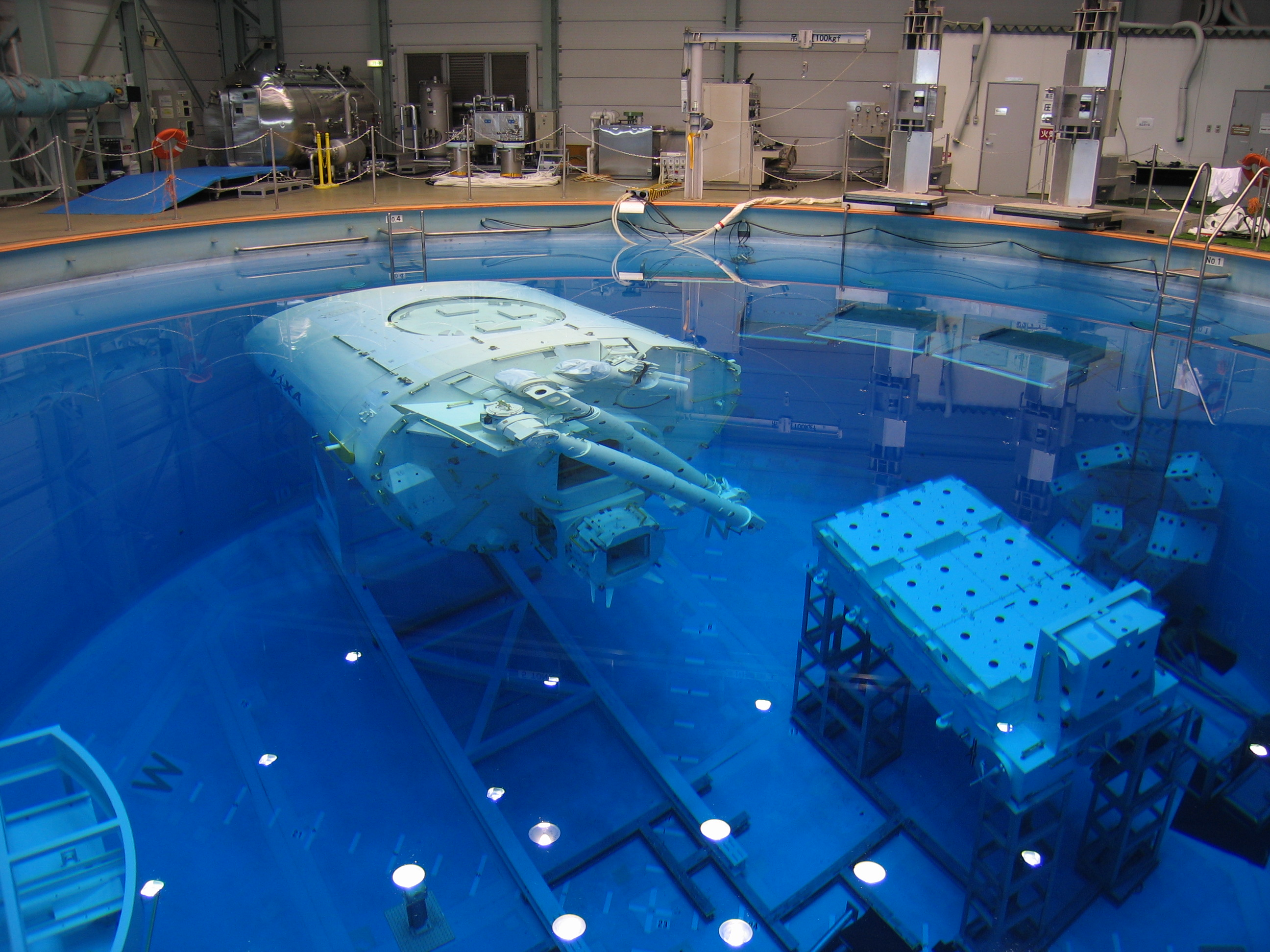
Kibō development

The Japanese Experiment Module (JEM), christened Kibō ("hope") in 1999, is Japan's first crewed spacecraft. Kibō consists of a pressurised laboratory dedicated to advanced technology experiments, education and art, a cargo bay, an unpressurised pallet for vacuum experiments in space, a robotic arm, and an interorbital communication system. While the proposed space station was redesigned many times around Kibō, the only significant change has been the placement of its ballistic shielding. Its final position at the front of the station increases the risk of damage from debris. The ESA and NASA, by contrast, both reduced the size of their laboratories over the course of the programme. The Japanese National Space Development Agency (NASDA) formally submitted the JEM proposal to NASA in March 1986, and by 1990 design work began. Constructed in the Tobishima Plant of Nagoya Aerospace Systems Works, by Mitsubishi Heavy Industries, Ltd., Kibō made its way to the Tsukuba Space Center and in 2003 Kibō was shipped, first by river barge and then by ship, to America. In 2010, Kibō won the Good Design Award, a 69-year-old consumer and industry award which identifies the best of Japanese craftsmanship.

In the 1980s Japan was working on the HOPE-X spaceplane, intended to launch on the H-II rocket. Depending on the configuration of the rocket, it would have a mass of between 10 and 20 tonnes, and be able to carry both crew and cargo. It would launch vertically and land horizontally. The programme was terminated by JAXA in 2003 after scale mockup testing.

== Columbus ==
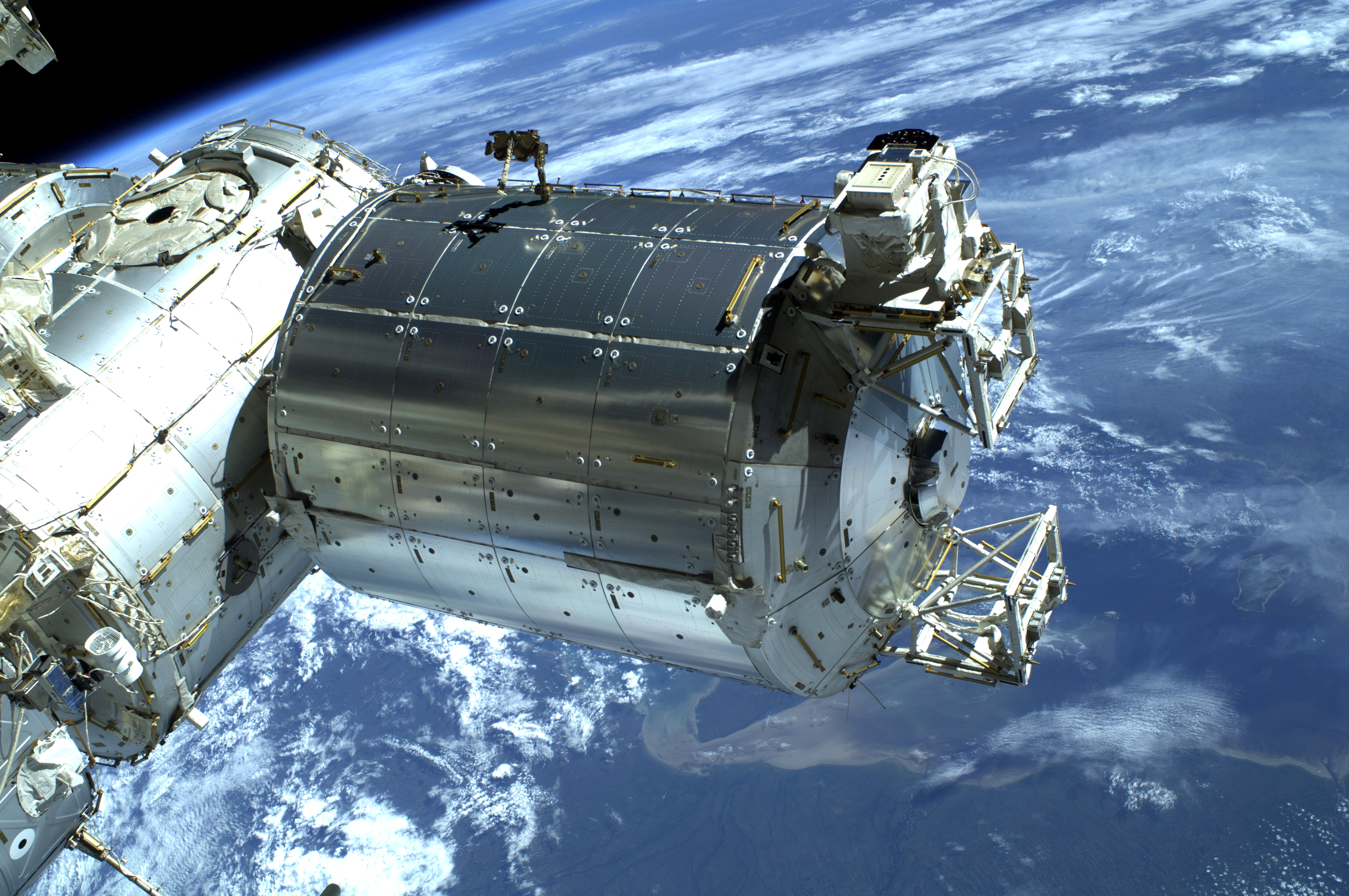
Columbus ISS module

In 1987 the ESA approved the Columbus laboratory. 1988, Europe was working on several space projects including the Columbus module, the Man-Tended Free Flyer (MTFF), and the Polar Platform (PPF), supported by the Ariane 5 rocket and the Hermes spaceplane.

The Columbus Man-Tended Free Flyer (MTFF) was an ESA programme to develop a space station that could be used for a variety of microgravity experiments while serving ESA's needs for an autonomous crewed space platform. The MTFF would be a space station without long term life support, visited by short term crews to replenish and maintain experiments in a Zero-G environment free of vibrations caused by a permanent crew. The project was cancelled after budget constraints caused by German reunification. The Hermes spaceplane is comparable in function to the American and Soviet space shuttles, with a smaller crew of up to 6 (reduced to 3 with ejection seats after the Challenger disaster) and substantially smaller cargo capacity, 4,550 kg, comparable to ISS uncrewed cargo ships.

By 1991 the Columbus and Hermes pre-development activities were good enough to progress into full development, however profound geopolitical changes prompted examining broader international co-operation, in particular with the Russian Federation. ESA Member States approved the complete development of the Attached Pressurised Module (APM) and the Polar Platform (PPF) for Columbus, but the Man-Tended Free-Flyer (MTFF) was abandoned. The Hermes programme was reoriented into the Manned Space Transportation Programme (MSTP), and a three-year period extending from 1993 to 1995 was agreed on to define a future crewed space transportation system in co-operation with Russia, including joint development and use of Mir-2.
