= National Aerospace Laboratory =

National Aerospace Laboratory may refer to:

- National Aerospace Laboratory of Japan
- National Aerospace Laboratories, Indian aerospace institution
- Royal Netherlands Aerospace Centre, formerly known as the National Aerospace Laboratory
