= CS-4 =

The CS-4 project was a series of satellites that Japan's National Space Development Agency planned to launch from 1995 onwards.

The CS-4 series was described by Tomifumi Godai, one of NASDA's executive directors, as "an engineering test satellite . . . to develop communication technology with antennas of various bandwidths".

The project was announced as cancelled in 1990, after the US Department of Commerce described the series as conventional communications satellites which could be used by Nippon Telegraph and Telephone instead of buying satellites on the open market. As that market was dominated by the US, they threatened to impose punitive tariffs on Japanese goods. This was possible due to the "Super 301" clause of the 1988 Trade Act, which threatens retaliation against unfair trading.

Godai responded by saying the CS-4 had no commercial use, with NASDA merely developing the technology with no intention of selling it. Even after Japan said that it would allow foreign suppliers to bid for commercial satellite contracts, the program was still dropped.
