= Kakuda =

Kakuda 角田市
- City
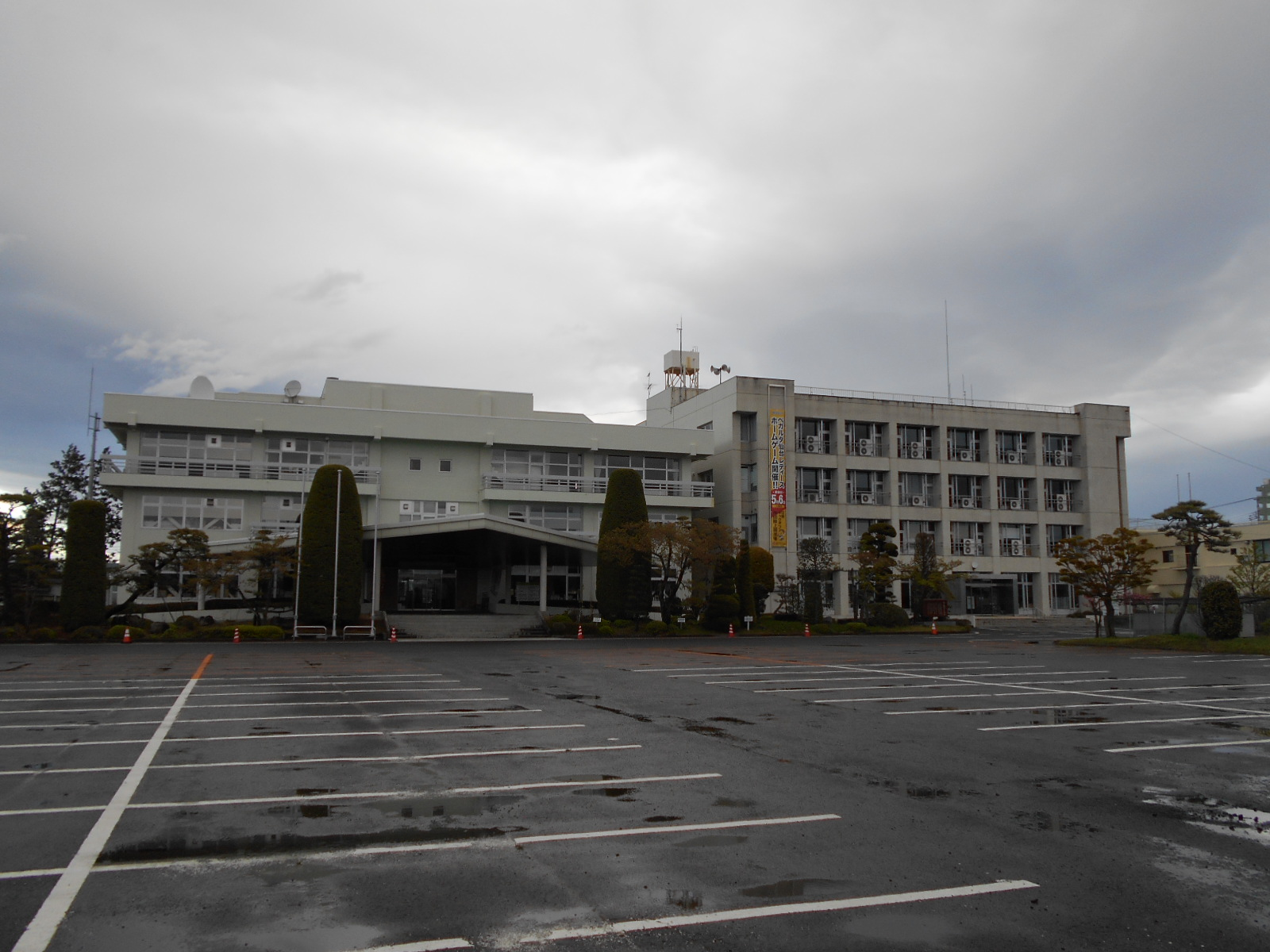
- Kakuda city hall

- Flag Seal

- Location of Kakuda in Miyagi Prefecture

- Coordinates: 37°58′37.3″N 140°46′55.4″E
- Country: Japan
- Region: Tōhoku
- Prefecture: Miyagi

Government
  - Mayor: Yasushi Ito

Area
  - Total: 147.53 km^{2} (56.96 sq mi)

Population (May 31, 2020)
  - Total: 28,539
  - Density: 193.45/km^{2} (501.02/sq mi)
- Time zone: UTC+9 (Japan Standard Time)
- Tree: Live Oak
- Flower: Japanese Gentian
- Phone number: 0224-63-2111
- Address: Kakuda Azadaibō 41, Kakuda-shi, Miyagi-ken 981-1592
- Website: Official website

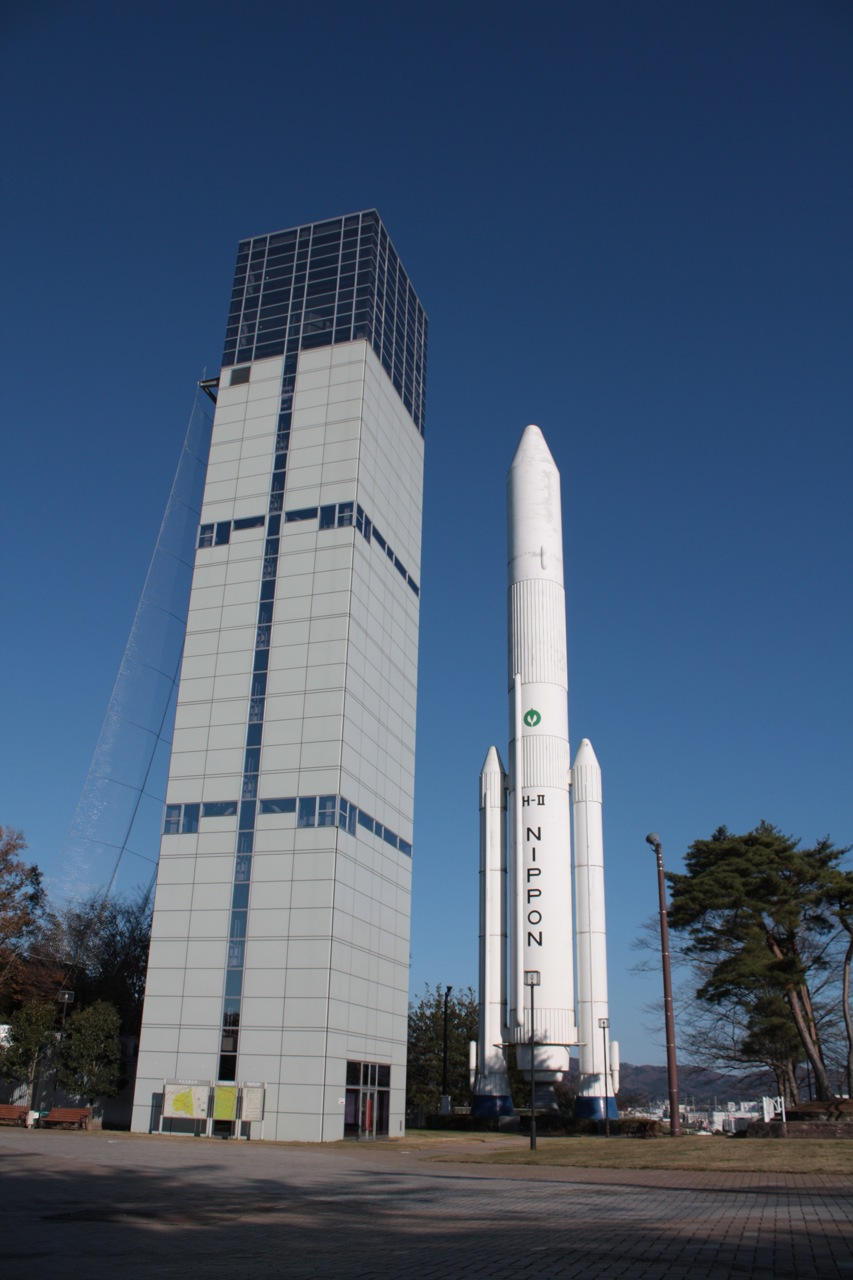
Taizan Park with H-II rocket

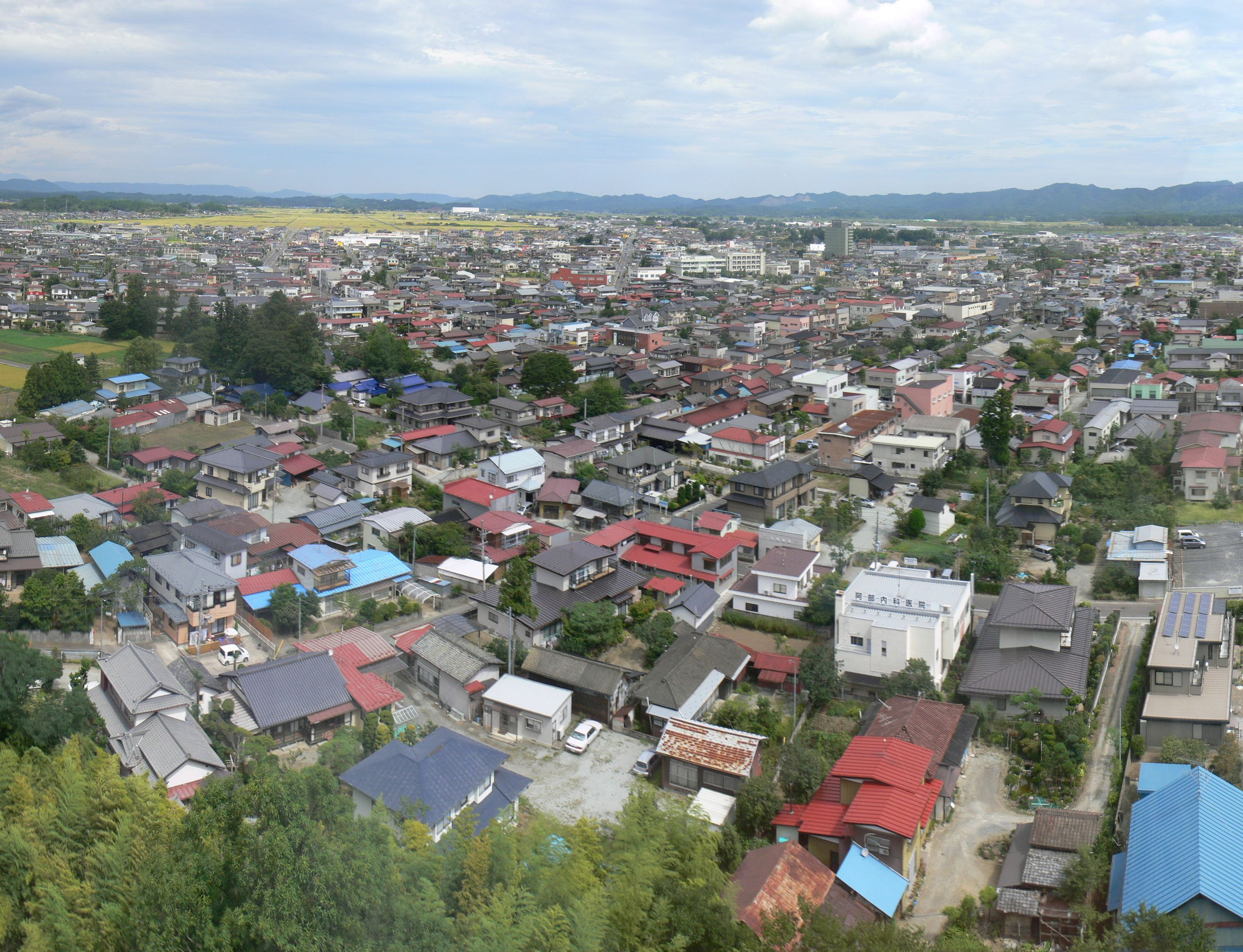
Panorama of Kakuda City

Kakuda (角田市, Kakuda-shi) is a city located in Miyagi Prefecture, Japan. As of 31 May 2020, the city had an estimated population of 28,539, and a population density of 190 persons per km^{2} in 11,494 households. The total area of the city is 147.58 square kilometres (56.98 sq mi).

== Geography ==
Kakuda is in southeastern Miyagi Prefecture in the Tōhoku region of northern Japan. The Abukuma River flows through the city.

=== Neighboring municipalities ===
Miyagi Prefecture

- Marumori
- Ōgawara
- Shibata
- Shiroishi
- Watari
- Yamamoto

=== Climate ===
Kakuda has a humid subtropical climate (Köppen climate classification Cfa) characterized by mild summers and cold winters. The average annual temperature in Kakuda is 12.6 °C. The average annual rainfall is 1259 mm with September as the wettest month. The temperatures are highest on average in August, at around 24.9 °C, and lowest in January, at around 1.6 °C.

== Demographics ==
Per Japanese census data, the population of Kakuda peaked around 1950 and has fluctuated in the decades since, with a general trend of decline.

Historical population
Year	Pop.	±%
1920	26,232	—
1930	28,839	+9.9%
1940	30,236	+4.8%
1950	37,376	+23.6%
1960	34,497	−7.7%
1970	31,170	−9.6%
1980	33,731	+8.2%
1990	35,431	+5.0%
2000	33,199	−6.3%
2010	31,336	−5.6%
2020	27,976	−10.7%

== History ==
The area of present-day Kakuda was part of ancient Mutsu Province, and was the location of Kakuda Castle during the Sengoku period. It was part of the holdings of Sendai Domain during the Edo period under the Tokugawa shogunate.

The town of Kakuda was established with the creation of the post-Meiji restoration modern municipalities system on April 1, 1889. It annexed the neighboring villages of Kitago, Sakura, Nishine, Higashine, Fujio, and Edano on October 1, 1954. Kakuda was raised to city status on October 1, 1958.

== Government ==
Kakuda has a mayor-council form of government with a directly elected mayor and a unicameral city legislature of 18 members. Kakuda, together with neighboring Marumori, contributes one seat to the Miyagi Prefectural legislature. In terms of national politics, the city is part of Miyagi 3rd district of the lower house of the Diet of Japan.

== Economy ==
Kakuda has a mixed economy based on light manufacturing of automotive parts and electrics, and on agriculture, primarily the cultivation of soybeans and plums. The area was traditionally noted for its sericulture.

== Education ==
Kakuda has eight public elementary schools and three public middle schools operated by the city government and one public high school operated by the Miyagi Prefectural Board of Education. The prefecture also operates one special education school for the handicapped.

== Transportation ==
=== Railway ===
AbukumaExpress – Abukuma Express Line

- Minami-Kakuda - Kakuda - Yokokura - Oka

=== Highway ===
- National Route 113
- National Route 349

== Sister cities ==
- Greenfield, Indiana, United States, since September 12, 1990
- Ishikawa, Fukushima, Japan, since April 16, 1979
- Kuriyama, Hokkaido, Japan, since August 26, 1978

== Local attractions ==
- JAXA Kakuda Space Center
- Site of Kakuda Castle
- Kōzō-ji – Buddhist temple
- Yanase-ura Site, archaeological site with Jomon period settlement traces, National Historic Monument

== Noted people from Kakuda ==
- Shinichi Ito, motorcycle racer
- Saito Brothers, consist of Jun and Rei, Professional Wrestlers
