= Kakuda Space Center =

Development facility of JAXA

- 角田宇宙センター

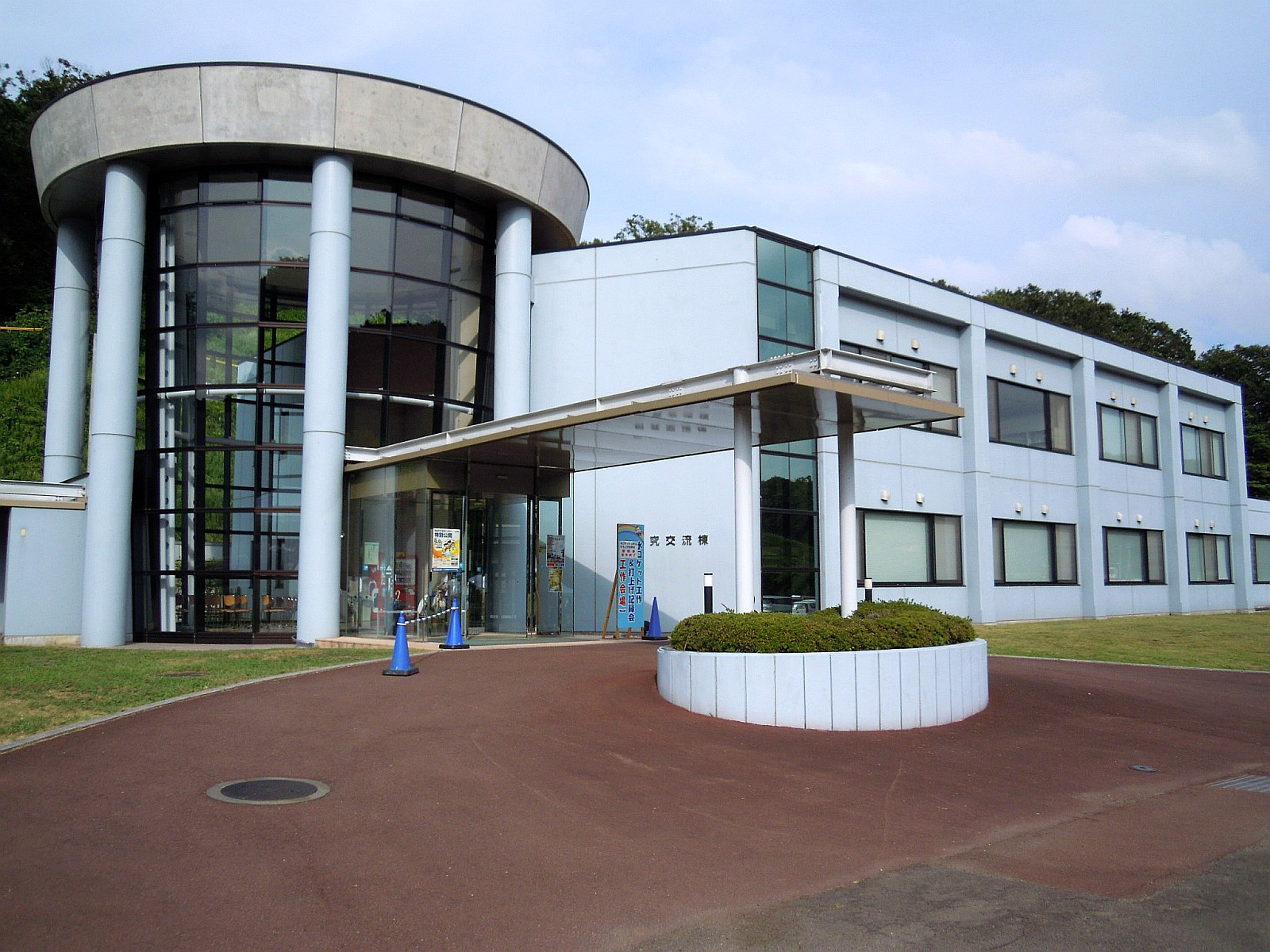
- Research Exchange Bldg. of Kakuda Space Center

Agency overview
- Formed: 1965
- Jurisdiction: Japanese government
- Headquarters: Kakuda, Miyagi, Japan; 38°02′17″N 140°45′38″E
- Parent agency: JAXA
- Website: Official website
- Location in Miyagi Kakuda Space Center (Japan)

Kakuda Space Center (角田宇宙センター, Kakuda Uchu Sentaa) is a facility of the Japan Aerospace Exploration Agency (JAXA), located in the city of Kakuda in Miyagi Prefecture in northern Japan, specializing in the development and testing of rocket engines and space propulsion systems. The LE-5 (including the LE-5A/LE-5B version), and the LE-7 (including the LE-7A version) rocket enginese were developed at the Kakuda Space Center.

== History ==
The predecessor to the Kakuda Space Center was established in 1965 as the "Kakuda Branch Laboratory" of the National Aerospace Laboratory of Japan under the aegis of the Science and Technology Agency. In 1978, the National Space Development Agency (NASDA) constructed the "Kakuda Rocket Development Center" on the same campus. Its purpose was to engage in basic research and development to raise the level of Japanese rocket propulsion technology. From the late 1980s, the Center also began research into space plane propulsion, especially scramjet technology and advanced materials research for reusable space engines.

In October 2003, the three separate Japanese space agencies, the Institute of Space and Astronautical Science (ISAS), the National Aerospace Laboratory (NAL), and NASDA, merged to form the Japan Aerospace Exploration Agency (JAXA). In 2005, the Kakuda Space Center was officially renamed the "Kakuda Space Propulsion Technology Research Center".

== Facilities ==
- Liquid hydrogen rocket engine test facility
- High pressure liquid oxygen turbo pump test facility
- Rocket engine high altitude performance test facility
- Ram jet engine test facility
- High temperature shock tunnel
- Cryogenic test facility
- High altitude combustion test facility
- Supply system comprehensive test facility
