= Kōzō-ji (Kakuda) =

- 高蔵寺
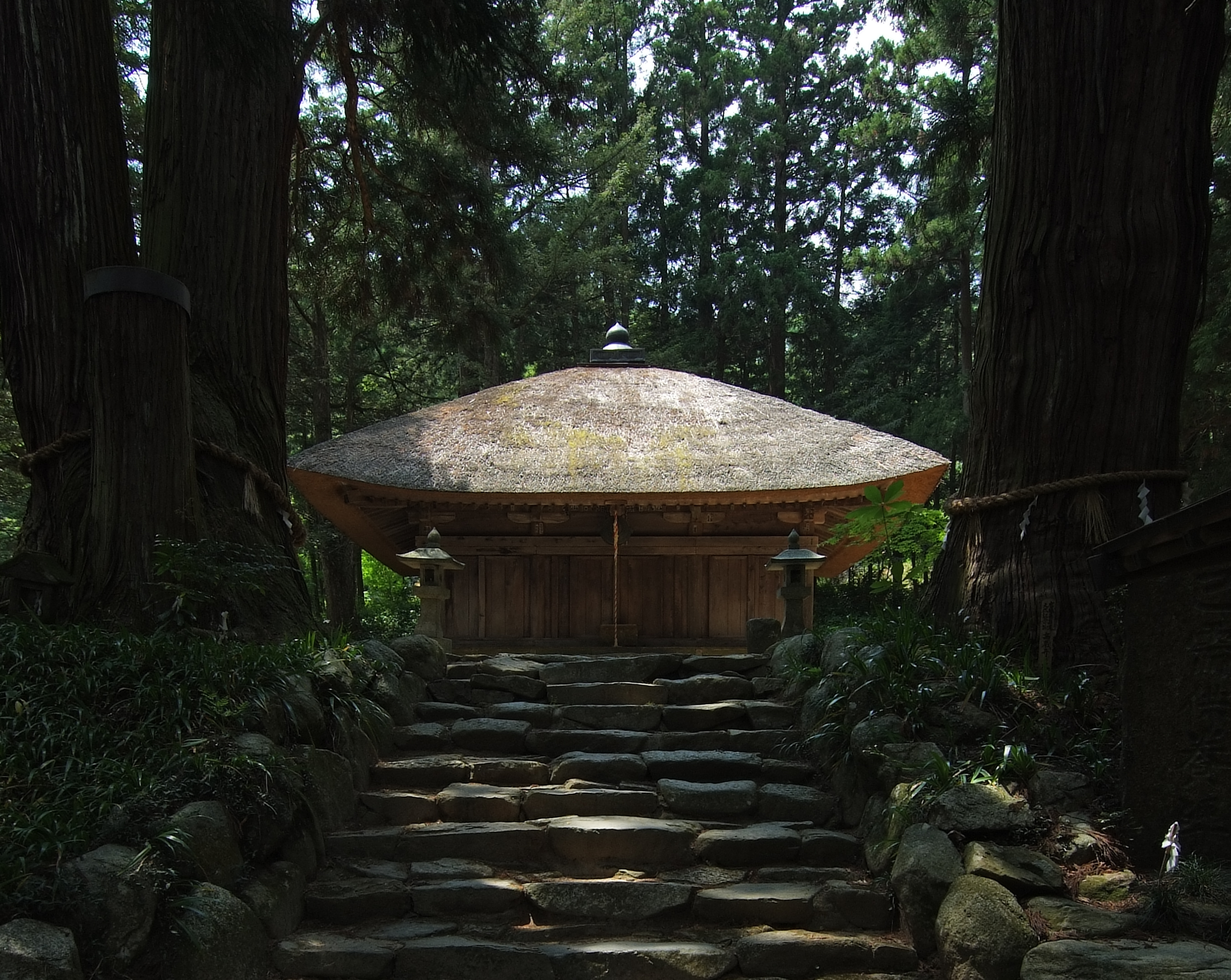
- Kōzō-ji Amida-dō

- Location within Miyagi Prefecture Location within Japan

Religion
- Affiliation: Buddhist
- Deity: Amida Nyorai
- Rite: Shingon-shū Chizan-ha

Location
- Location: 49 Tera-mae, Takakura-aze Kakuda-shi, Miyagi-ken
- Interactive map of Kōzō-ji
- Coordinates: 38°0′1″N 140°43′6″E

Architecture
- Founder: Tokuitsu
- Completed: 819

Website
- https://web.archive.org/web/20110719065515/http://www.city.kakuda.miyagi.jp/syoko/page00110.shtml

Kōzō-ji (高蔵寺) is a Buddhist temple located in the city of Kakuda, Miyagi Prefecture, Japan.

Kōzō-ji was founded in 819 AD by Tokuitsu, a monk of the Hōsso sect. It was restored in 1177 by the wife of Fujiwara Shuei, who erected the Amida-dō, which is the oldest building in the prefecture, and one of the very few Heian period structures remaining. In 1908 it was designated an Important Cultural Property.

The 273 centimetres (8.96 ft) wooden statue of Amida Nyorai seated on a lotus throne (1177), constructed using the yoseki-zukuri technique, was designated an Important Cultural Property in 1927.

== See also ==
- Pure Land Buddhism
- Japanese Buddhist architecture
- Japanese sculpture
- Important Cultural Properties of Japan
- Northern Fujiwara
