= HOPE-X =

Japanese experimental spaceplane

- HOPE-X
- Country of origin: Japan

Size
- Height: 15.2 m (50 ft)
- Diameter: 9.7 m (32 ft) (wing span)
- Mass: 14 t (31,000 lb)
- Stages: launched on H-IIA

Launch history
- Status: Project cancelled

HOPE (H-II Orbiting Plane) was a Japanese experimental spaceplane project designed by a partnership between NASDA and NAL (both now part of JAXA), started in the 1980s. It was positioned for most of its lifetime as one of the main Japanese contributions to the International Space Station, the other being the Japanese Experiment Module. The project was eventually cancelled in 2003, by which point test flights of a sub-scale testbed had flown successfully.

== History ==
At the time of the planning phase for HOPE-X, Japanese spaceflight had seen a string of successful advancements in the decade prior, including the development of the N-I and N-II rocket systems and the launch of the first Japanese satellites. Japan was a participant in plans for the Space Shuttle program as well as the proposed Space Station Freedom (later the ISS), and sought development of a vehicle to support its cooperation with the United States in low Earth orbit operations.

By 1990, NASDA had established the basic concept for the HOPE spaceplane, proposing an unmanned vehicle that would launch atop the in-development H-II rocket, dock with the Space Station Freedom to deliver cargo, and land autonomously on a runway. This evolved into a sub-scale orbital prototype known as HOPE-X, for H-II Orbiting Plane, Experimental. This would be used for flight testing and systems validation, before moving onto the larger HOPE, a 4-man 22-metric-ton (49,000 lb) design. As the name implies, both would be launched on Japan's new H-II launcher, though the full-scale HOPE would require substantial upgrades in launch performance.

=== Models and test flights ===
As part of the overall Japanese space program, testing for technologies that would be used on HOPE and other projects was well advanced. In February 1994 the first test flight of the new H-II launcher was used to also launch the experimental OREX ballistic re-entry vehicle, which tested various communications systems, heating profiles and heat shielding components. Another project, HYFLEX, followed in February 1996. Hyflex was intended to test the carbon-carbon heat shielding tiles that were intended to be used on HOPE, as well as having the same body shaping in order to gather data on hypersonic lifting. HYFLEX was successful, but sank in the Pacific after splashdown before it could be recovered. Another test project, ALFLEX followed HYFLEX in 1996.

=== Reduction in scope ===
In 1997, well into the study, it was decided that HOPE-X should be modified into an unmanned cargo vehicle with the addition of automated approach and docking systems, and a cargo bay with doors similar to the one on the U.S. Space Shuttle. It was believed this would result in a "quick and dirty" cargo supply system for ISS, which was suffering from continued delays due to problems with the Shuttle program. It was estimated that such a conversion could be completed for an additional US$292 million, less expensive than designing a completely new ballistic cargo vehicle for the H-II launcher, and much less expensive that the estimated US$2.9 billion needed to complete the full-sized HOPE. Even the small HOPE-X launched on unmodified H-IIA rockets would deliver a useful 3 metric tons (6,600 lb) to ISS, about the same as the Progress spacecraft's approximate 2,500 kilograms (5,500 lb). HOPE-X was about 15.2 metres (50 ft) long with a 9.7 metres (32 ft) wingspan.

=== Project conclusion ===
In 1998, the H-II suffered from a string of failures. A re-evaluation of the entire space program followed, and budget constraints later forced a reduction in overall funding by US$690 million to US$4.22 billion for the five-year spending period between 1998 and 2002. This would force a delay in the timeline for the HOPE-X, with its first flight in 2003. By this time NASDA had spent only US$305 million since the project was approved in 1988, reflecting the status as a research project. The next year the H-II project was cancelled outright, proceeding with the simplified and lighter H-IIA alone. Hughes pulled out of the H-IIA project at about this time; they had initially purchased ten launches on the system and it was considered a major international success for NASDA.

HOPE continued to soldier on. In 2000, an agreement was signed to land the returning vehicle at Aeon Airstrip on Christmas Island in Kiribati. The High Speed Flight Demonstration project consisted of 25% scale models of HOPE-X to test navigation technologies and flight characteristics. As the 2003 deadline approached a number of debates broke out about the launcher profile, with many arguing that the H-II should be replaced with a jet-powered cargo aircraft for an air-start. The first flight was pushed back further to 2004. Before this milestone was reached a major re-organization of NASDA took place in order to address its obvious overcommitment in light of Japan's economic stagnation, especially now that there were demands for a crash program to develop spy satellites in order to track North Korean nuclear efforts. JAXA was formed, and HOPE was cancelled in 2003.

== See also ==
- Buran (spacecraft)
- EADS Phoenix - successor to the cancelled Hermes program that was a contemporary of HOPE.
- Fuji (Spacecraft)
- H-II Transfer Vehicle
- Space Shuttle program
- RLV-TD - an Indian spaceplane program
- X-37
