= Yokokura Station (Miyagi) =

Railway station in Kakuda, Miyagi Prefecture, Japan

Yokokura Station 横倉駅
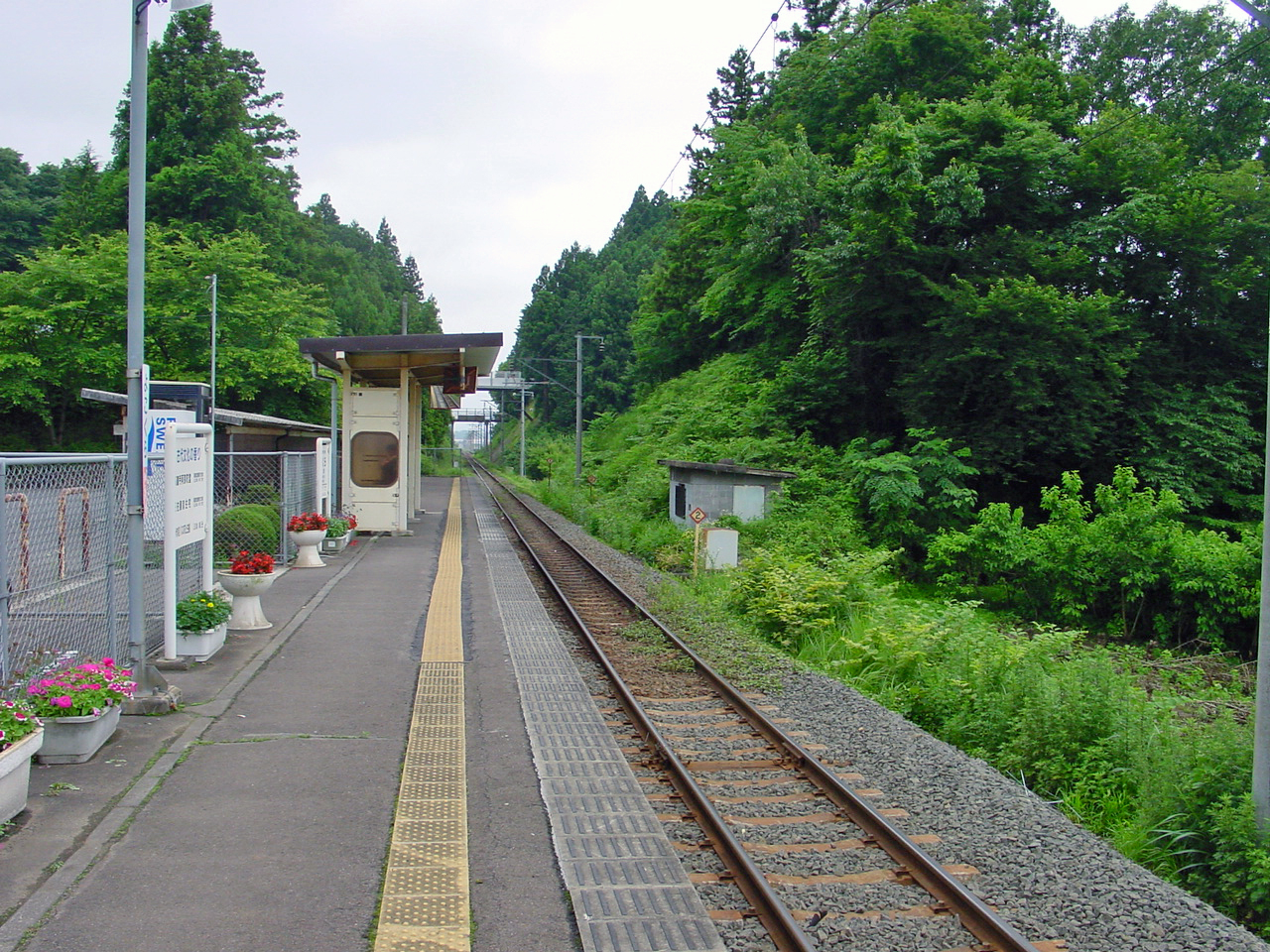
- Yokokura Station, June 2003

General information
- Location: Yokokura, Kakuda-shi, Miyagi-ken; Japan
- Coordinates: 37°59′48.57″N 140°46′33.86″E
- Operator: AbukumaExpress
- Line: ■ Abukuma Express Line
- Distance: 45.2 km from Fukushima
- Platforms: 1 side platform
- Tracks: 1

Other information
- Status: Unstaffed
- Website: Official website

History
- Opened: July 1, 1968
Location
- Location within Japan

Yokokura Station (横倉駅, Yokokura eki) is a railway station on the AbukumaExpress in the city of Kakuda, Miyagi Prefecture, Japan.

== Lines ==
Yokokura Station is served by the Abukuma Express Line, and is located 45.2 rail kilometers from the official starting point of the line at Fukushima.

== Station layout ==
Yokokura Station has one side platform serving a single bi-directional track. The station is unattended.

== Adjacent stations ==
«	Service	»
Abukuma Express Line
Rapid: Does not stop at this station
Kakuda	Local	Oka

== History ==
Yokokura Station opened with the start of operations of the Abukuma Express on July 1, 1986.

== Surrounding area ==
The station is located in a rural area with few buildings nearby.

- Japan National Route 113
- Japan National Route 349

== See also ==
- List of railway stations in Japan
