= National Aerospace Laboratory of Japan =

Space aviation organization/institute

- 航空宇宙技術研究所 (Japanese); Kōkū Uchū Gijutsu Kenkyūjo

Agency overview
- Abbreviation: NAL
- Former name: National Aeronautical Laboratory
- Formed: July 1955; 71 years ago (as National Aeronautical Laboratory); 1963; 63 years ago (as National Aerospace Laboratory of Japan)
- Dissolved: October 1, 2003; 22 years ago (merged into JAXA)
- Type: Space agency
- Jurisdiction: Japan
- Official language: Japanese

The National Aerospace Laboratory of Japan (NAL), was established in July 1955. Originally known as the National Aeronautical Laboratory, it assumed its present name with the addition of the Aerospace Division in 1963. Since its establishment, it has pursued research on aircraft, rockets, and other aeronautical transportation systems, as well as peripheral technology. NAL was involved in the development of the autonomous ALFLEX aircraft and the cancelled HOPE-X spaceplane.

NAL has also endeavored to develop and enhance large-scale test facilities and make them available for use by related organizations, with the aim of improving test technology in these facilities.

The NAL began using computers to process data since the 1960s. It began working to develop supercomputer and numerical simulation technologies in order to execute full-scale numeric simulations. The NAL, in collaboration with Fujitsu, developed the Numerical Wind Tunnel parallel supercomputer system, which went into operation in 1993. From 1993 to 1995, it was the most power supercomputer in the world, and was one of the top 3 in the world until 1997. It remained in use for 9 years after it began operations.

On October 1, 2003, NAL, which had focused on research and development of next-generation aviation, merged with the Institute of Space and Astronautical Science (ISAS), and the National Space Development Agency (NASDA) of Japan into one Independent Administrative Institution: the Japan Aerospace Exploration Agency (JAXA).
