= National Space Development Agency of Japan =

Japanese national space agency

- 宇宙開発事業団
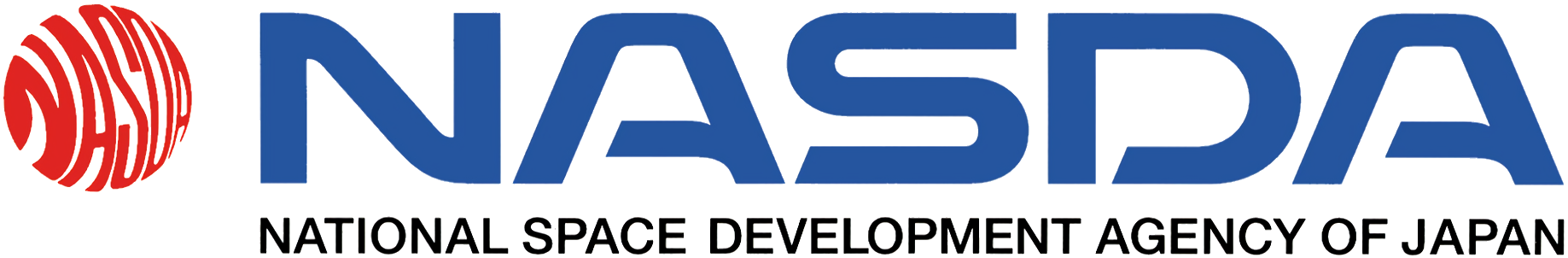

Agency overview
- Abbreviation: NASDA
- Formed: October 1, 1969; 56 years ago
- Dissolved: October 1, 2003; 22 years ago
- Superseding agency: JAXA
- Type: Space agency

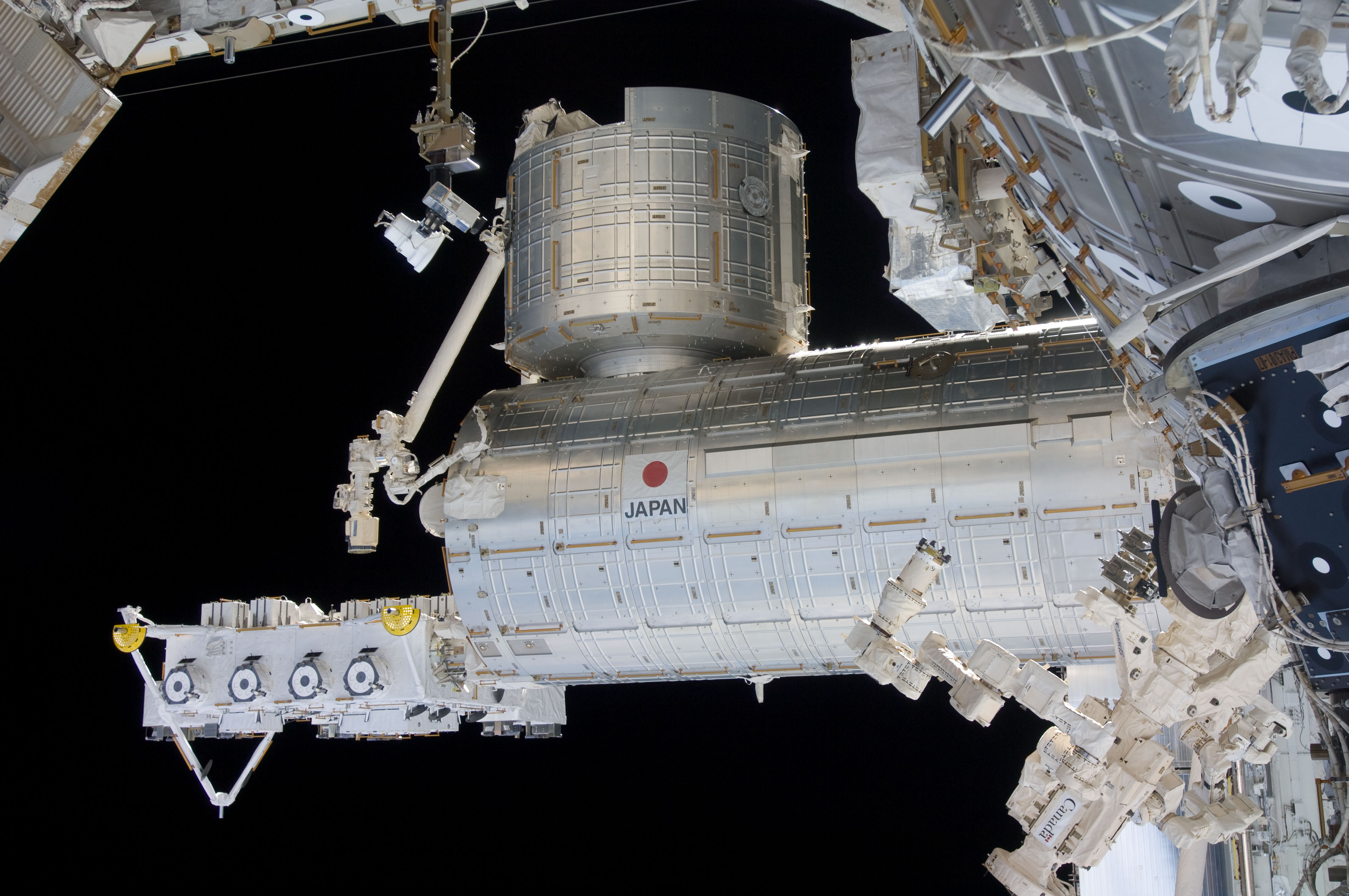
The Japanese Experiment Module, a.k.a. きぼう (Kibō), on the International Space Station.

The National Space Development Agency of Japan (宇宙開発事業団, Uchū Kaihatsu Jigyōdan) (NASDA) was the national space agency of Japan, established on October 1, 1969 under the National Space Development Agency Law only for peaceful purposes. Based on the Space Development Program enacted by the Minister of Education, Culture, Sports, Science and Technology (MEXT), NASDA was responsible for developing satellites and launch vehicles as well as launching and tracking them.

The first launch vehicles of NASDA (N-I, N-II, and H-I) were partially based on licensed technology from the United States, particularly the Delta rocket family. The H-II was the first liquid fuel rocket to be fully developed in Japan.

Hideo Shima, chief engineer of the original Shinkansen "bullet train" project, served as Chief of NASDA from 1969 to 1977.

On October 1, 2003, NASDA merged with the Institute of Space and Astronautical Science (ISAS) and the National Aerospace Laboratory of Japan (NAL) into one Independent Administrative Institution: the Japan Aerospace Exploration Agency (JAXA).

SL-J was partially funded by Japan through NASDA; this cooperative Japanese-American mission launched a NASDA astronaut into Earth orbit using the Space Shuttle in 1992.

Work on the Japanese Experiment Module at ISS, and also HOPE-X, was started under NASDA and inherited by JAXA.

== See also ==
- CS-4
